= Busan =

City in South Korea

- Metropolitan city
- Busan Metropolitan City
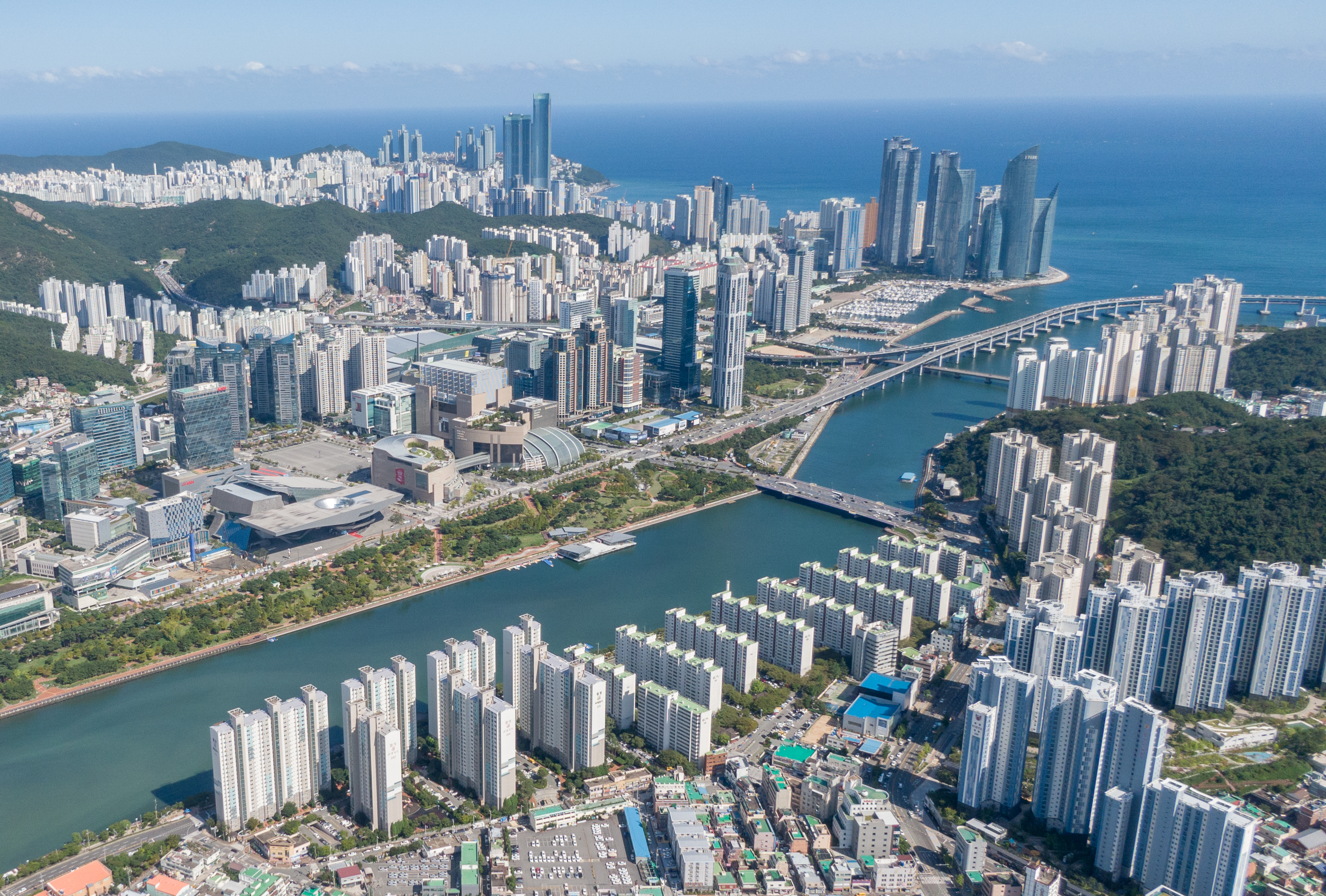
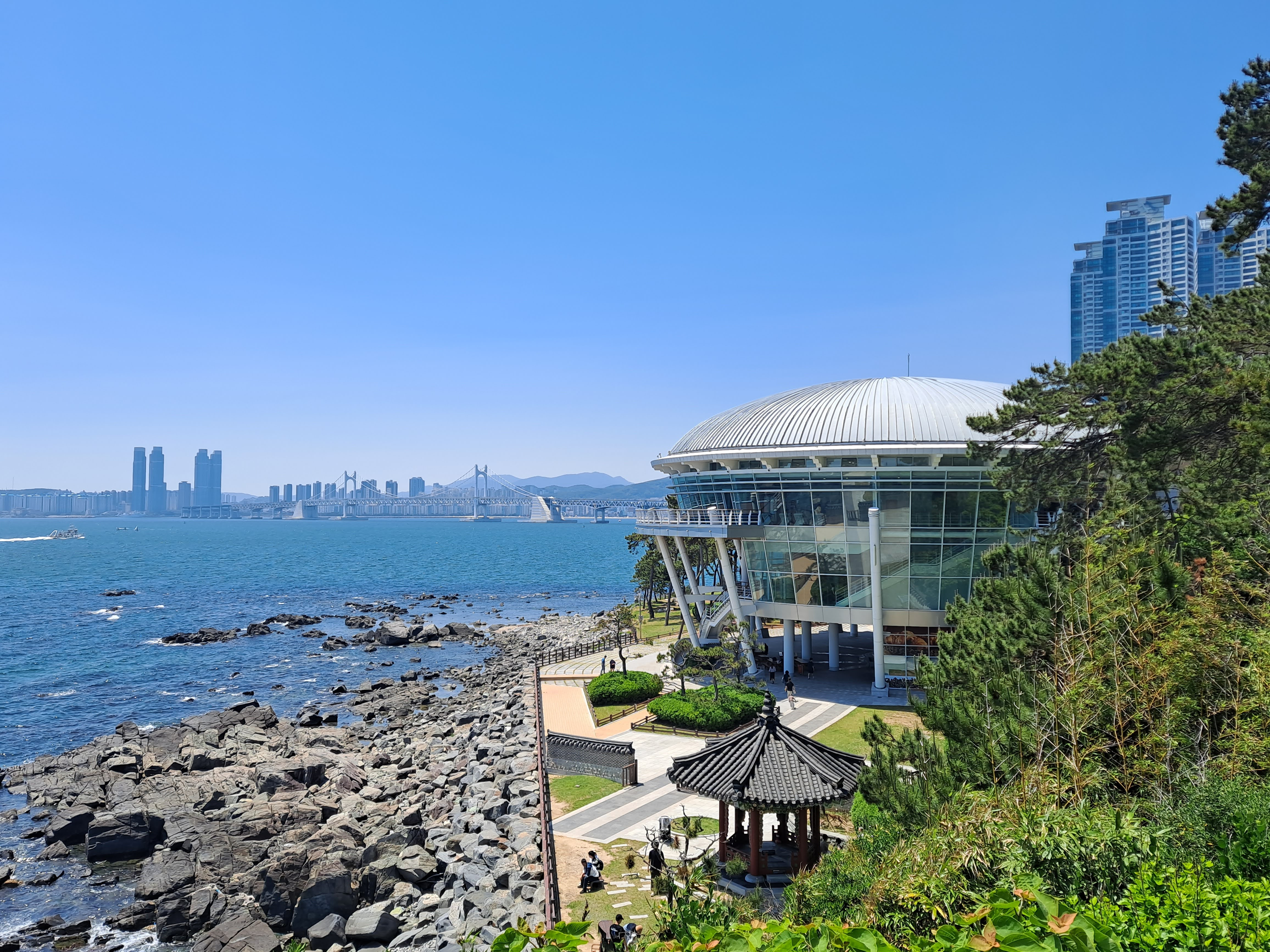
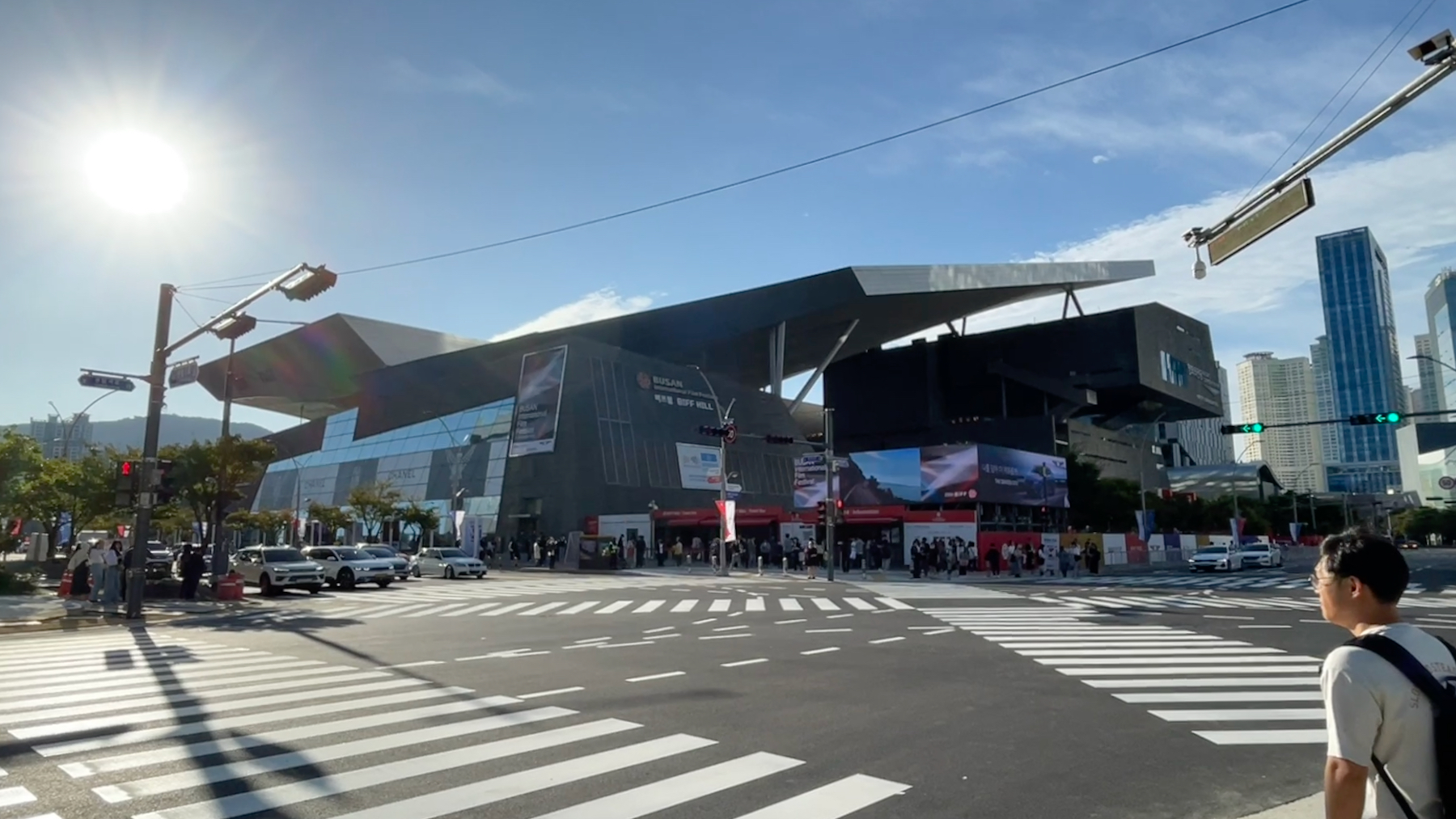
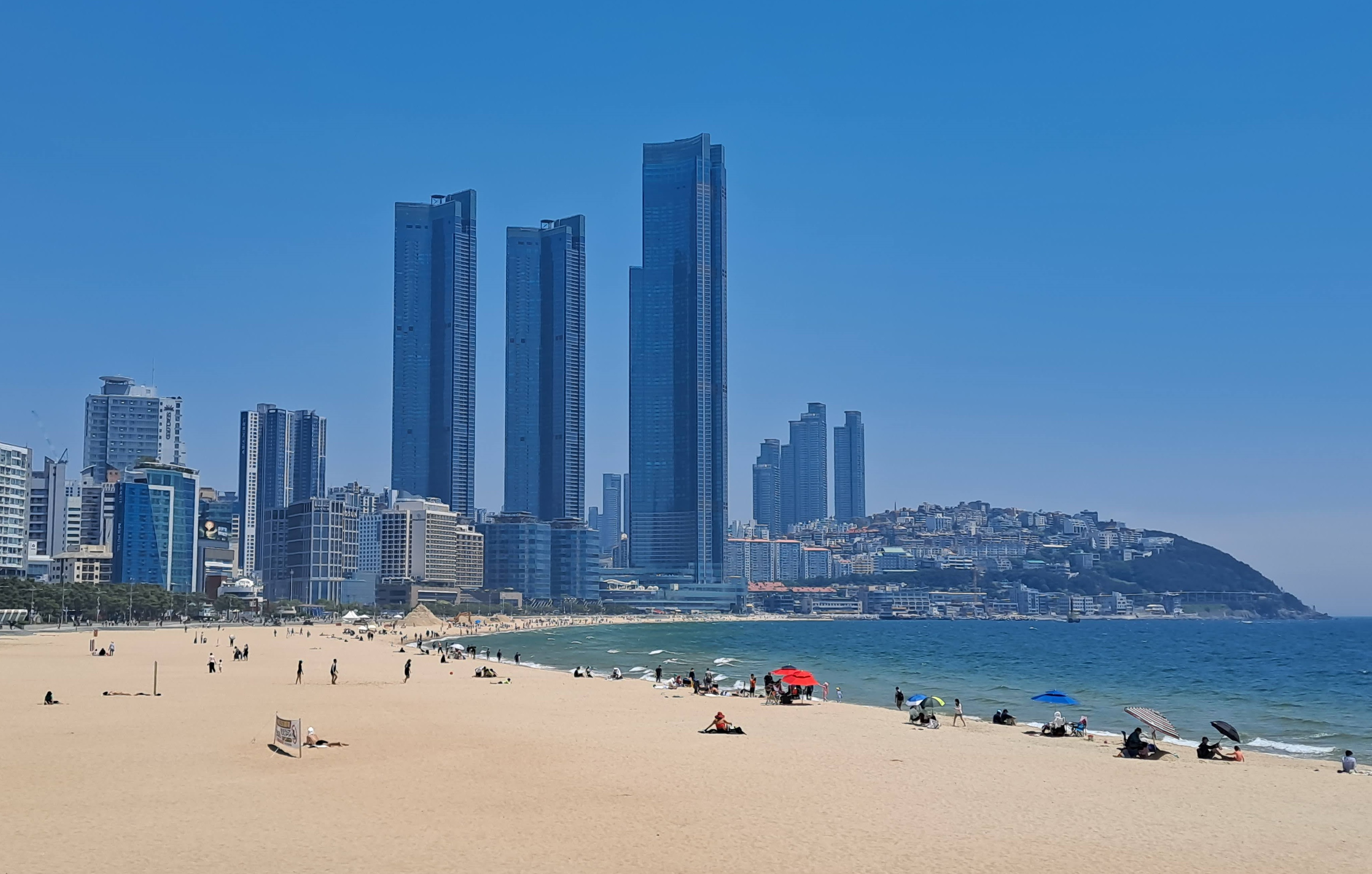
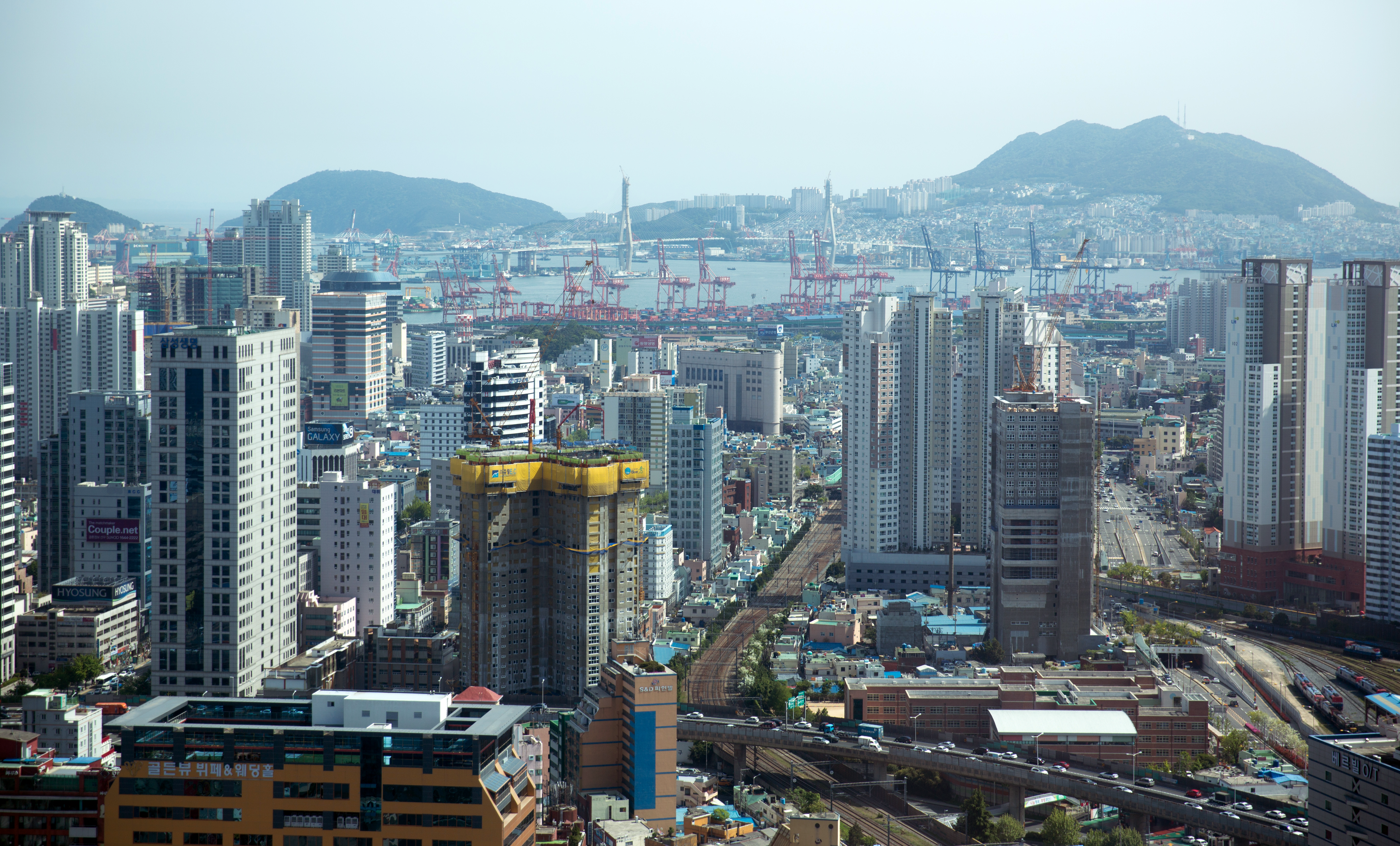
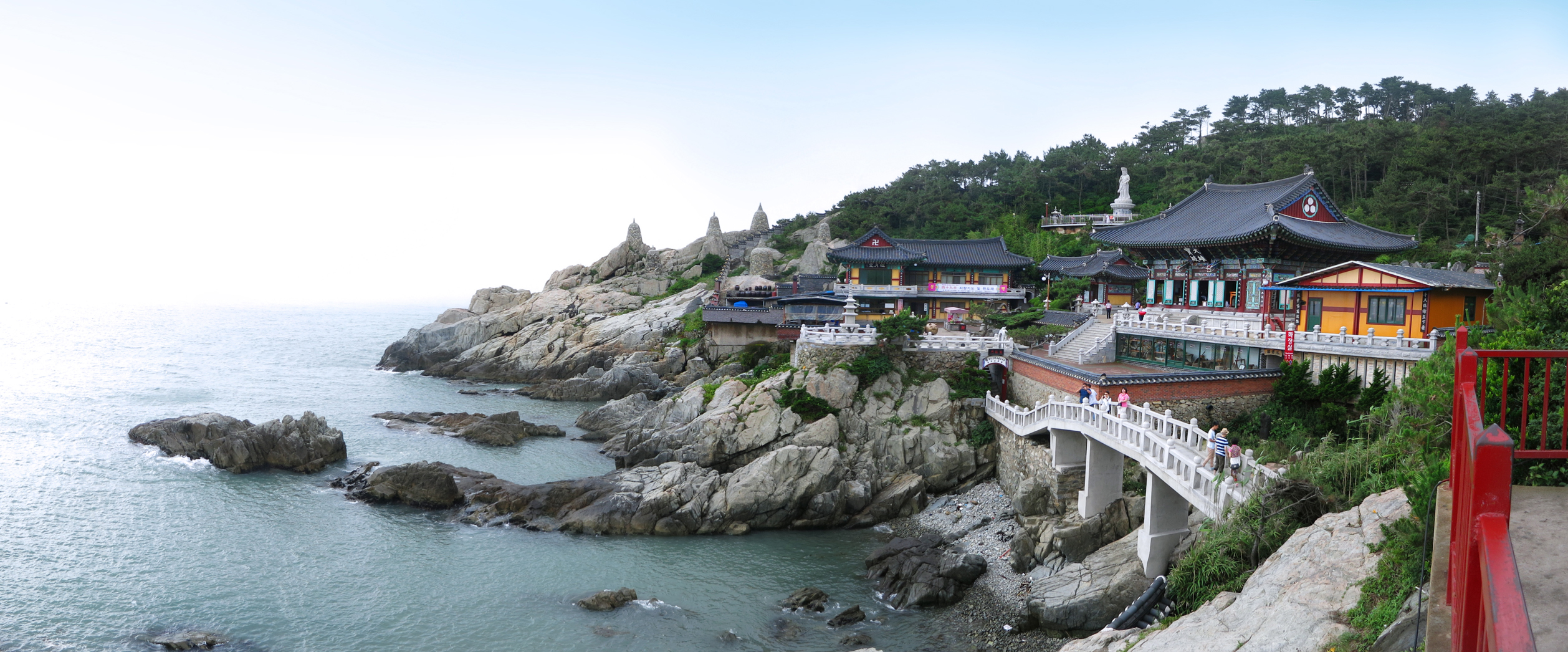
- Skyline of Busan's Haeundae District Dongbaekseom Busan Cinema Center Haeundae Beach Seo-myeon Haedong Yonggungsa

- Flag Logo Wordmark
- Interactive map of Busan
- Coordinates: 35°10′48″N 129°04′30″E
- Country: South Korea
- Region: Yeongnam
- Districts: 16

Government
  - Type: Mayor-Council
  - Mayor: Chun Jae-soo (Democratic)
  - Body: Busan Metropolitan Council
  - National Representation: National Assembly: 18 / 299 6.0% (total seats) 18 / 245 7.3% (constituency seats) List: Jeon Jaesoo (Democratic) Buk-gu / Gangseo-gu A district; Kim Do-eup (People Power) Buk-gu / Gangseo-gu B district; Suh Byung-soo (People Power) Busanjin-gu A district; Lee Heon-seung (People Power) Busanjin-gu B district; Kim Heegon (People Power) Dongnae-gu district; Baek Jong-heon (People Power) Geumjeong-gu district; Ha Tae-keung (People Power) Haeundae-gu A district; Kim Mi-ae (People Power) Haeundae-gu B district; Hwangbo Seunghee (People Power) Jung-gu / Yeongdo-gu district; Park Soo-young (People Power) Nam-gu A district; Park Jaeho (Democratic) Nam-gu B district; Choi Inho (Democratic) Saha-gu A district; Cho Kyoung Tae (People Power) Saha-gu B district; Chang Je Won (People Power) Sasang-gu district; Ahn Byung-gil (People Power) Seo-gu / Dong-gu district; Jeon Bong-gil (People Power) Suyeong-gu district; Jeong Dongman (People Power) Gijang district; Lee Juhwan (People Power) Yeonje-gu district

Area
  - Metropolitan city: 770.04 km^{2} (297.31 sq mi)

Population (January 2026)
  - Metropolitan city: 3,285,147
  - Density: 4,266.2/km^{2} (11,049/sq mi)
  - Metro: 4,000,000
  - Dialect: Gyeongsang
- Demonym: Busanian

GDP (Nominal, 2023)
  - Metropolitan city: KRW 114 trillion (US$ 91 billion)
  - Per capita: US$ 31,611
- Area code: (+82) 051
- ISO 3166 code: KR-26
- Flower: Camellia
- Fish: Mackerel
- Bird: Seagull
- Website: busan.go.kr/eng

Korean name
- Hangul: 부산광역시
- Hanja: 釜山廣域市
- RR: Busan-gwangyeoksi
- MR: Pusan-gwangyŏksi

Busan (Korean: 부산; pronounced [pusʰan]; alternatively romanized as Pusan), officially Busan Metropolitan City, is the second most populous city in South Korea, after Seoul; it has a population of over 3.3 million as of 2024. It is the economic, cultural and educational center of southeastern South Korea, with its port being South Korea's busiest and the sixth-busiest in the world. (Note: It is the 9th busiest in the world by cargo tonnage.) The surrounding "Southeastern Maritime Industrial Region" (including Ulsan, South Gyeongsang, Daegu, and part of North Gyeongsang and South Jeolla) is South Korea's largest industrial area. The large volumes of port traffic and urban population in excess of 1 million makes Busan a Large-Port metropolis using the Southampton System of Port-City classification. As of 2025, Busan Port is the primary port in Korea and the world's sixth-largest container port.

Busan is divided into 15 major administrative districts and a single county, together housing a population of approximately 3.3 million. The entire metropolitan area, the Southeastern Maritime Industrial Region, has a population of approximately 8 million. The most densely built-up areas of the city are situated in a number of narrow valleys between the Nakdong and the Suyeong Rivers, with mountains separating most of the districts. The Nakdong River is Korea's longest river and Haeundae Beach is the country's largest beach.

Busan is a center for international conventions, hosting an APEC summit in 2005, and the China–United States Busan Summit in 2025. It is also a center for sports tournaments in Korea, having hosted the 2002 Asian Games and FIFA World Cup. It is home to the world's largest department store, the Shinsegae Centum City. Busan was added to the UNESCO Creative Cities Network as a "City of Film" in December 2014.

== Names ==
The name "Busan" is the Revised Romanization of the city's name. The name 부산 has been recorded since the late 15th century. "Busan" officially replaced the earlier McCune–Reischauer romanization Pusan in 2000. (Note: This name is also sometimes written as "Pusan City" (Pusan-si) and "Pusan Directly-Administered City" (Busan-jikhalsi or Pusan-chikhalsi).) During the Japanese colonial period, the Japanese reading of the city's name was "Fuzan" which may have remained in the maps that Americans used during the Korean war.

The name 釜山 (now written 부산 using the Korean alphabet) is Sino-Korean for "Cauldron Mountain", believed to be a former name of Mt Hwangnyeong (Korean: 황령산; Hanja: 荒嶺山; RR: Hwangnyeongsan) west of the city center. The area's ancient state Mt Geochil (거칠산국; 居柒山國; Geochilsan-guk, "Rough-Mountain Land") is similarly thought to refer to the same mountain, which towers over the town's harbor on the Suyeong (the later Silla district of Geochilsan-gun was renamed Dongnae in 757).

== History ==
The area that Busan now occupies was inhabited during the Neolithic period. Artifacts dating to this period discovered near the coast include stone tools, pottery, sea shells, and animal bones. Fishing was a primary food source for people of this period. Bronze Age artifacts have been uncovered further inland. By this period agriculture was being practiced.

Around the first century, a chiefdom called Koch'ilsan-guk (거칠산국; 居漆山國) existed around what is now Dongnae District. At some point, it was absorbed by Silla and made an administrative division called Koch'ilsan-gun (거칠산군; 居漆山郡). In 757, it was renamed Dongnae-gun (동래군). In 835, the Buddhist temple Beomeosa was founded in the area.

In the Goryeo period (918–1392), the local Dongnae Jeong clan became a prominent presence in Korean politics. By this point, Dongnae's hot springs became famous, and have been attested to in writings of this period. By the end of the period, raids from wokou (Japanese pirates) intensified. One such invasion occurred in 1396. To defend against this, the fortress Dongnaeeupseong was established in the area.

In 1423, the port of Busan (부산포) and a waegwan (Japanese concession community) were established. During the reign of King Sejong the Great (r. 1418–1450), the population in Dongnae-hyeon was reportedly 2,416 people in 290 households. In Dongpyeong-hyeon, it was 627 people in 108 households. The waegwan was closed in 1510, but reopened in 1512.

During the 1592–1598 Japanese invasions of Korea, various fortresses in the area defended Busan against the invasion. Fortresses included Busanjinseong, Dadaeposeong, and Dongnaeeupseong. Civilians formed righteous armies (volunteer militias) and joined in the fight. After the siege and capture of Busanjin in 1592, most of Busanjin's Korean prisoners and civilians were massacred. After the war, diplomatic relations with the new shogunate in Japan were established in 1607, and Busan was permitted to be reconstructed.

In 1605, the shrine Songgongsa was built to honor those who died defending Korea during the invasions. The shrine was dubbed Chungnyeolsa in 1624. In 1607, a waegwan was reestablished in Dumopo (두모포; 豆毛浦); in 1678 it was moved to Choryang (초량; 草梁; now around Yongdusan). In 1763, Busan became the first place in Korea to have sweet potatoes, which arrived from Tsushima Island in Japan. In 1759, the population was reportedly 25,753 people in 6,657 households.

In 1876, Busan became the first international port in Korea under the terms of the Treaty of Ganghwa. In 1877, a concession was established in Busan, and consulates of Japan, Qing, and the United Kingdom were established. In 1883, the port was opened, and a Busan Customs Office (부산해관; 釜山海關) was established. In 1895, Dongnae-bu was made part of South Gyeongsang Province. It was demoted to a gun in 1903, and made a bu again in 1906. After the beginning of the 1910–1945 Japanese colonial period, in 1914 it was made a gun again. In 1908, Busan was connected to the Gyeongbu Line via Busan station. In 1909, a ferry service was opened between Busan and Shimonoseki in Japan. In 1914, Dongnae-bu was reorganized into Busan-bu. In 1915, a tram was opened between Busanjin and the Dongnae Hot Springs. The following year, the city tram opened.

During the Japanese rule, Busan developed into a hub trading port with Japan. Busan was the only city in Korea to adopt the steam tramway before electrification was introduced in 1924.

During the Korean War, Busan was one of only two cities in South Korea not captured by the North Korean army within the first three months of the war, the other being Daegu. As a result, the cities became refugee camp sites for Koreans during the war. According to The Korea Times, around 500,000 refugees were located in Busan in early 1951.

As Busan was one of the few areas in Korea that remained under the control of South Korea throughout the Korean War, for some time it served as a de facto capital of South Korea. UN troops established a defensive perimeter around the city known as the Pusan Perimeter in the summer and fall of 1950. Since then, the city has been a self-governing metropolis and has built a strong urban character.

In 1963, Busan separated from South Gyeongsang Province to become the first Directly Governed City of South Korea. In 1983, the provincial capital of Gyeongsangnam-do was moved from Busan to Changwon.

== Geography ==
Busan is located on the southeastern tip of the Korean Peninsula. It is located on the coast, which determined the development of the whole city itself. The distance from Busan to Seoul is about 314 km (195 mi). Busan borders low mountains to the north and west, and the Korea Strait to the south and east. The Nakdong River Delta is located on the west side of the city, and Geumjeongsan, the highest mountain in the city, is on the north. The Nakdong River, South Korea's longest river, flows through the west and empties into the Korea Strait. The southeastern region, called Yeongnam in Korea, encompasses both Gyeongsang Provinces and 3 metropolitan cities of Busan, Daegu and Ulsan. Ulsan lies northeast of Busan.

The closest overseas area to Busan is Tsushima, Japan, with a distance of about 49.5 km (30.8 mi). The closest Japanese mainland area to Busan is Fukuoka, roughly 180 km (112 miles) away. Busan and Fukuoka are also sister cities.

=== Climate ===
Busan

Climate chart (precipitation, max. and min. temperature)
J	F	M	A	M	J	J	A	S	O	N	D
35 8 0	50 10 2	90 14 5	141 18 10	156 22 15	188 25 18	327 28 22	267 30 24	161 26 20	80 23 15	50 17 8	34 10 2
- █ Average max. and min. temperatures in °C
- █ Precipitation totals in mm
Imperial conversion
J	F	M	A	M	J	J	A	S	O	N	D
1.4 47 32	2 50 35	3.5 57 42	5.5 65 50	6.1 72 58	7.4 76 65	13 82 72	10 85 75	6.3 80 68	3.1 73 58	2 62 47	1.3 51 36
- █ Average max. and min. temperatures in °F
- █ Precipitation totals in inches

Located on the southeasternmost tip of the Korean Peninsula, Busan has a cooler version of a humid subtropical climate, bordering on a subtropical monsoon climate influenced by the East Asian monsoon (Köppen: Cfa, bordering on Cwa). Extremely high or low temperatures are rare. The highest temperature ever recorded is 38.8 °C (101.8 °F) on 29 July 2026, while the lowest temperature ever recorded is −14.0 °C (6.8 °F) on 13 January 1915. May to July, late spring and early summer, are usually cooler than inland regions because of the ocean effect. Late summer, and early fall, August, and September, are generally hot and humid and the city may experience typhoons at that time and be generally rainy. On September 15, 1959, Super Typhoon Sarah passed by the coast of the city and caused catastrophic damage. An unusually severe storm on September 12, 2003, Typhoon Maemi, also caused damage to ships and buildings and resulted in over 48 fatalities. Typhoon Hinnamnor on September 6, 2022, caused destruction in Busan as a category 2, producing high waves, destructive winds, and flooding. Busan is among the most typhoon-prone cities in South Korea, owing to its position on the southern coast along recurving typhoon tracks.

October and November are generally the most comfortable, with clear skies and pleasant temperatures. Winters are cool and comparatively dry with high winds, but much milder than other parts of Korea, except Jeju Province and several islands off the southern coast. Busan and the nearby area have the least snow compared to other regions of Korea due to its location. Snow falls on an average of only about 4 days per year.

Climate data for Busan (1991–2020 normals, extremes 1904–present)
Month	Jan	Feb	Mar	Apr	May	Jun	Jul	Aug	Sep	Oct	Nov	Dec	Year
Record high °C (°F)	18.4 (65.1)	20.3 (68.5)	22.9 (73.2)	28.1 (82.6)	34.0 (93.2)	33.4 (92.1)	38.8 (101.8)	37.3 (99.1)	35.2 (95.4)	30.8 (87.4)	25.6 (78.1)	20.9 (69.6)	38.8 (101.8)
Mean daily maximum °C (°F)	8.2 (46.8)	10.2 (50.4)	13.8 (56.8)	18.2 (64.8)	22.0 (71.6)	24.6 (76.3)	27.5 (81.5)	29.5 (85.1)	26.4 (79.5)	22.5 (72.5)	16.6 (61.9)	10.4 (50.7)	19.2 (66.6)
Daily mean °C (°F)	3.6 (38.5)	5.4 (41.7)	9.1 (48.4)	13.8 (56.8)	17.9 (64.2)	21.0 (69.8)	24.4 (75.9)	26.1 (79.0)	22.6 (72.7)	17.9 (64.2)	11.9 (53.4)	5.8 (42.4)	15.0 (59.0)
Mean daily minimum °C (°F)	−0.1 (31.8)	1.5 (34.7)	5.3 (41.5)	10.1 (50.2)	14.6 (58.3)	18.3 (64.9)	22.1 (71.8)	23.7 (74.7)	19.8 (67.6)	14.5 (58.1)	8.3 (46.9)	2.0 (35.6)	11.7 (53.1)
Record low °C (°F)	−14.0 (6.8)	−12.6 (9.3)	−9.7 (14.5)	−1.5 (29.3)	5.4 (41.7)	9.3 (48.7)	13.8 (56.8)	15.4 (59.7)	9.6 (49.3)	1.8 (35.2)	−6.5 (20.3)	−12.0 (10.4)	−14.0 (6.8)
Average precipitation mm (inches)	34.5 (1.36)	49.6 (1.95)	89.7 (3.53)	140.9 (5.55)	155.9 (6.14)	188.4 (7.42)	326.8 (12.87)	266.5 (10.49)	160.6 (6.32)	79.6 (3.13)	50.4 (1.98)	33.8 (1.33)	1,576.7 (62.07)
Average precipitation days (≥ 0.1 mm)	5.4	5.9	8.3	9.2	9.1	10.4	13.6	11.9	9.2	5.3	6.0	4.7	99.0
Average snowy days	1.4	1.2	0.5	0.0	0.0	0.0	0.0	0.0	0.0	0.0	0.1	0.9	4.1
Average relative humidity (%)	46.8	49.4	56.0	61.1	68.3	76.8	83.4	78.5	72.6	62.7	56.3	48.1	63.3
Mean monthly sunshine hours	203.1	189.4	202.0	212.6	228.5	180.3	172.3	199.2	173.8	212.1	195.5	205.6	2,374.4
Percentage possible sunshine	63.6	59.3	52.0	53.6	51.1	41.4	37.5	48.2	44.9	59.6	62.6	67.0	52.3
Average ultraviolet index	2	4	6	7	9	10	10	10	8	5	3	2	6
Source 1: Korea Meteorological Administration (percent sunshine 1981–2010)
Source 2: Weather Atlas (UV)

== Administrative divisions ==
In 1957, Busan adopted a division system with the creation of six gu (districts): Busanjin District, Dong District, Dongnae District, Jung District, Seo District, and Yeongdo District. Today, Busan has divided into fifteen gu and one gun (county).

A map of Busan's districts

Subdivision	Korean	Area (km^{2})	Population (January 2018)
Buk District	북구; 北區	39.36	303,955
Busanjin District	부산진구; 釜山鎭區	29.70	372,922
Dong District	동구; 東區	9.73	90,668
Dongnae District	동래구; 東萊區	16.63	271,350
Gangseo District	강서구; 江西區	181.50	123,636
Geumjeong District	금정구; 金井區	65.27	249,054
Haeundae District	해운대구; 海雲臺區	51.47	417,174
Jung District	중구; 中區	2.83	45,821
Nam District	남구; 南區	26.81	278,681
Saha District	사하구; 沙下區	41.75	337,423
Sasang District	사상구; 沙上區	36.09	233,443
Seo District	서구; 西區	13.93	111,906
Suyeong District	수영구; 水營區	10.21	181,526
Yeongdo District	영도구; 影島區	14.15	124,918
Yeonje District	연제구; 蓮堤區	12.08	207,396
Gijang County	기장군; 機張郡	218.32	164,546

== Economy ==
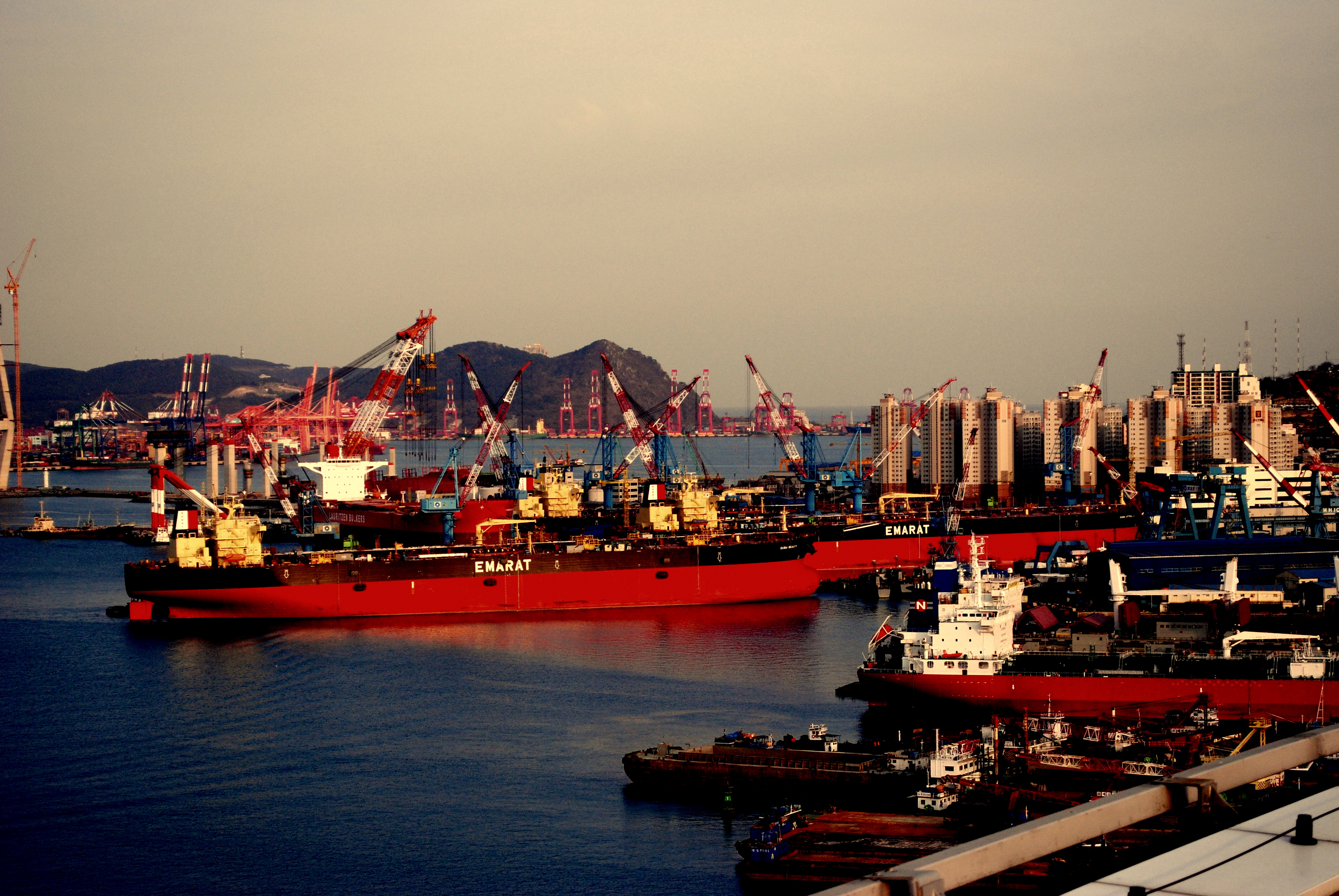
Hanjin Heavy Industries

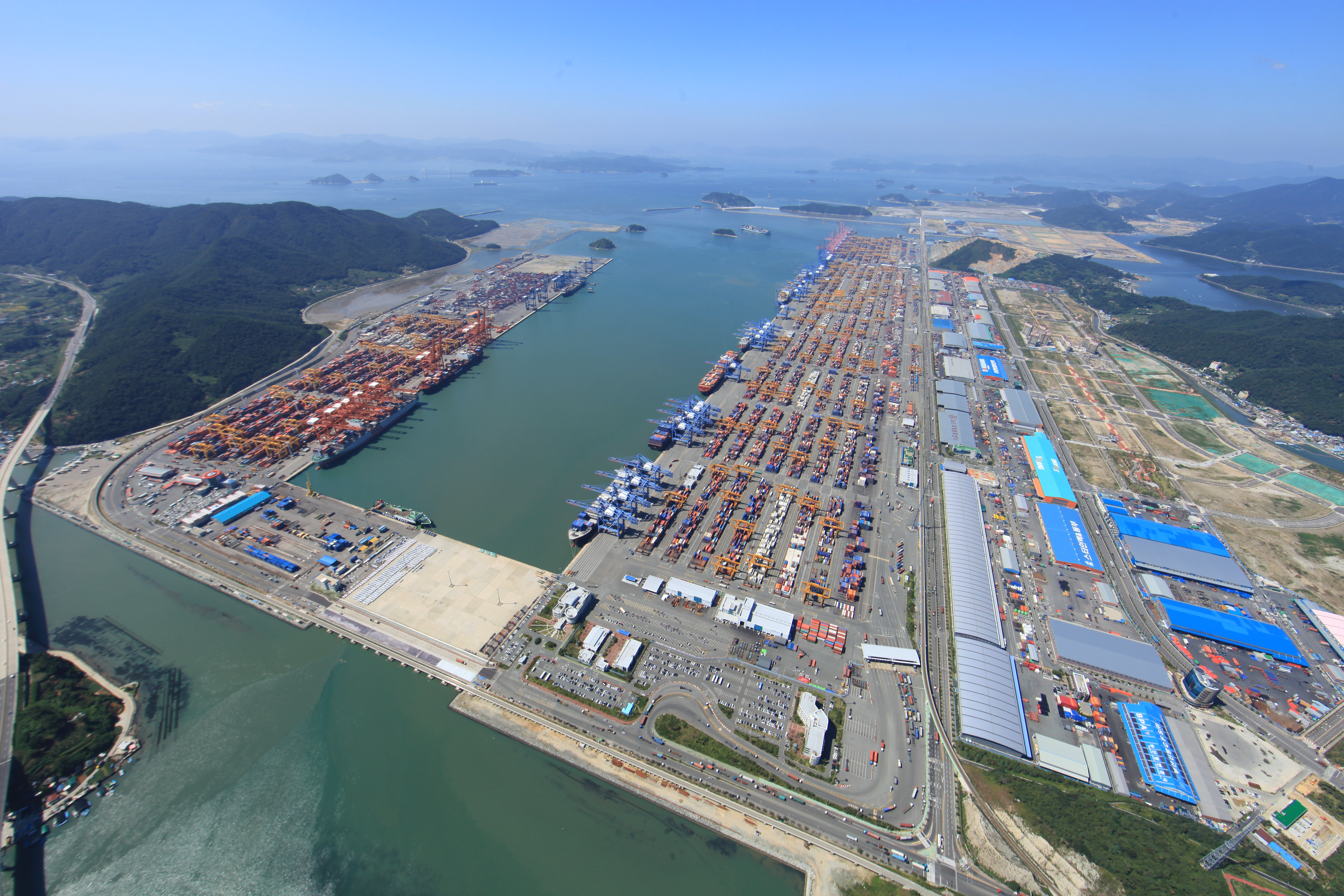
Busan New Port

Busan is the second largest city in Korea, a maritime logistics hub, and a world-class mega port, it acts as a gateway to the Eurasian continent. In 2022, the maritime city recorded a GRDP of KRW 104 trillion with a per capita GRDP of KRW 39.6 million. As of 2023, the city's economy is primarily made up of the service industry (75.8%), manufacturing (17.4%), and agriculture & fisheries (0.5%).

As the sixth largest port in the world, the port of Busan processed 21.81 million TEU of container cargo volume in 2020. The port's container terminal has 43 berths - 20 berths at the North Port, and 23 berths at the Busan New Port (including 2 multi-purpose berths). The port is part of the 21st Century Maritime Silk Road that runs from the Chinese coast to Singapore, towards the southern tip of India to Mombasa, from there through the Red Sea via the Suez Canal to the Mediterranean, there to the Upper Adriatic region to the northern Italian hub of Trieste with its connections to Central Europe and the North Sea.

Moreover, the city is a center of marine science and R&D, and home to a number of relevant institutions, such as the Korea Maritime Institute (KMI), the Korea Institute of Ocean Science and Technology (KIOST), the National Fishery Products Quality Management Service, the Korea Hydrographic and Oceanographic Agency (KHOA), and the Korea National Maritime Museum, located in Dongsam Innovation Complex in Yeongdo District. Moreover, the International Federation of Freight Forwarders Associations (FIATA) World Congress was hosted in Busan in 2022.

The city is also known for its global MICE (Meetings, Incentives, Conferences, and Exhibitions) industry. The city's convention and exhibition zone have excellent conditions and infrastructure to host large-scale international events, which includes BEXCO in Centum City, Nurimaru APEC House, and hotels nearby natural environments. Major international conferences in Busan include the 2005 APEC Economic Leaders' Meeting, ASEAN–Republic of Korea Commemorative Summit 2014, and 2018 African Development Bank Group Annual Meetings.

Busan is also a center of finance. Korea Exchange (KRX), Korea's sole securities exchange operator, is headquartered in Busan. The city is home to a number of financial institutions, such as the Korea Technology Finance Corporation, Korea Asset Management Corporation, Korea Housing-Finance Corporation, Korea Housing & Urban Guarantee Corporation, Korea Securities Depository, Korea Maritime Guarantee Insurance, Maritime Finance Center, The Korea Shipping and Maritime Transportation Co., Ltd, Korea Asset Management Corporation, and BNK Financial Group.

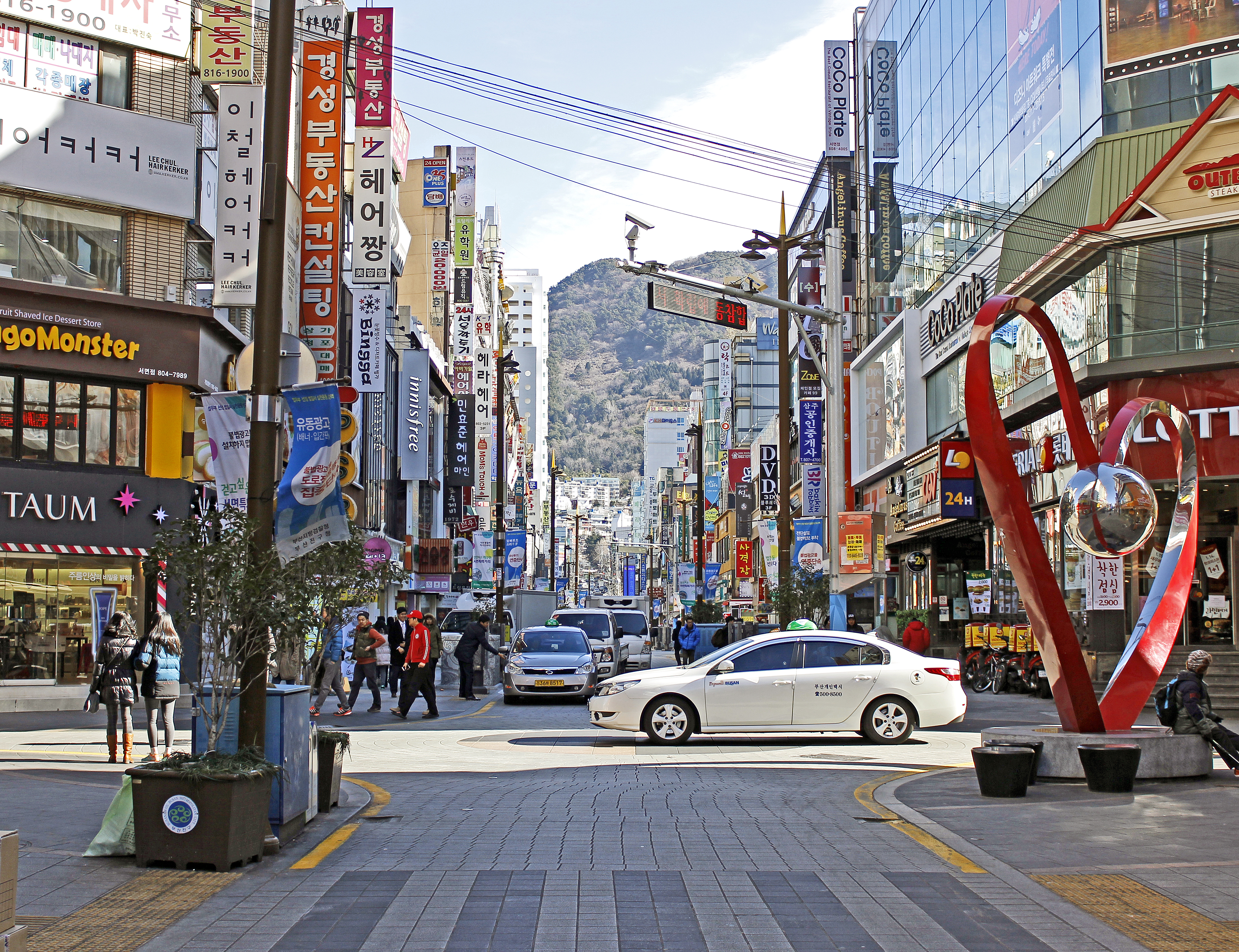
Seomyeon

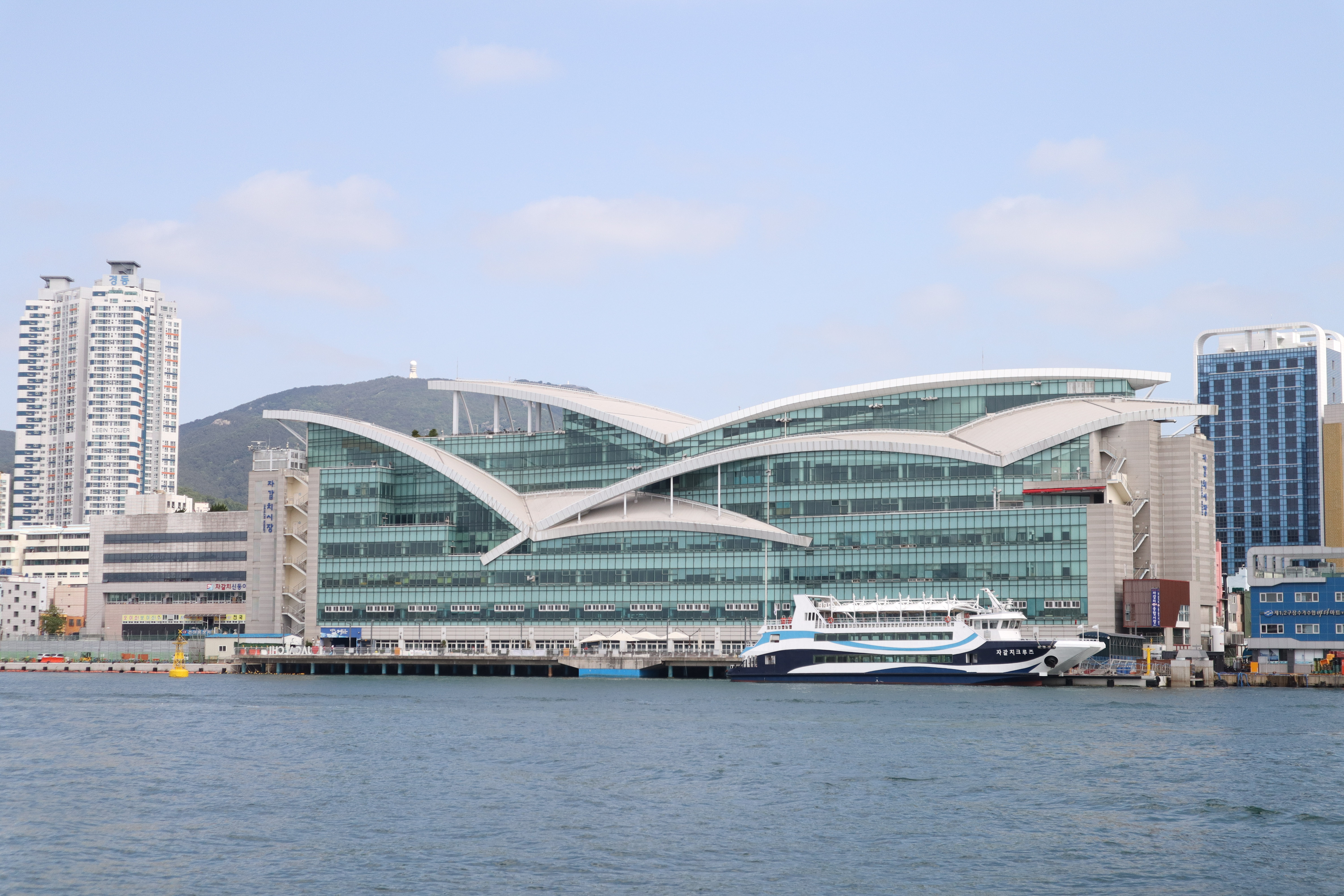
Jagalchi Market

Commercial areas are dispersed throughout the city near busy intersections and adjacent to university campuses, but the two largest central business districts in Busan are Seomyeon and Gwangbok-dong/Nampo-dong. There are four major shopping areas: Seomyeon, Gwangbok-dong, Busan Daehak-ga in Jangjeon-dong, and Centum City in Haeundae District.

Seomyeon Station is one of the busiest subway stations in Korea; it is the transfer station between Busan Subway Line 1 and Line 2. Seomyeon subway station is also home to a large number of underground stores, selling a variety of products, predominantly clothing, and footwear. These are small stores selling locally produced products. The local head offices of Korean and international banks are located in Seomyeon. It is recognized as the ascendant shopping and entertainment district. It is also home to "Seomyeon Medical Street", the district encompassing the 1km-radius range around Lotte Department Store in Seomyeon and the Buam subway station. The Street is home to a total of 160 cosmetic and other medical clinics, including those specializing in cosmetic surgery, dermatology, ophthalmology and dentistry. Directly adjacent to Seomyeon is Bujeon Market, the largest traditional market in the city.

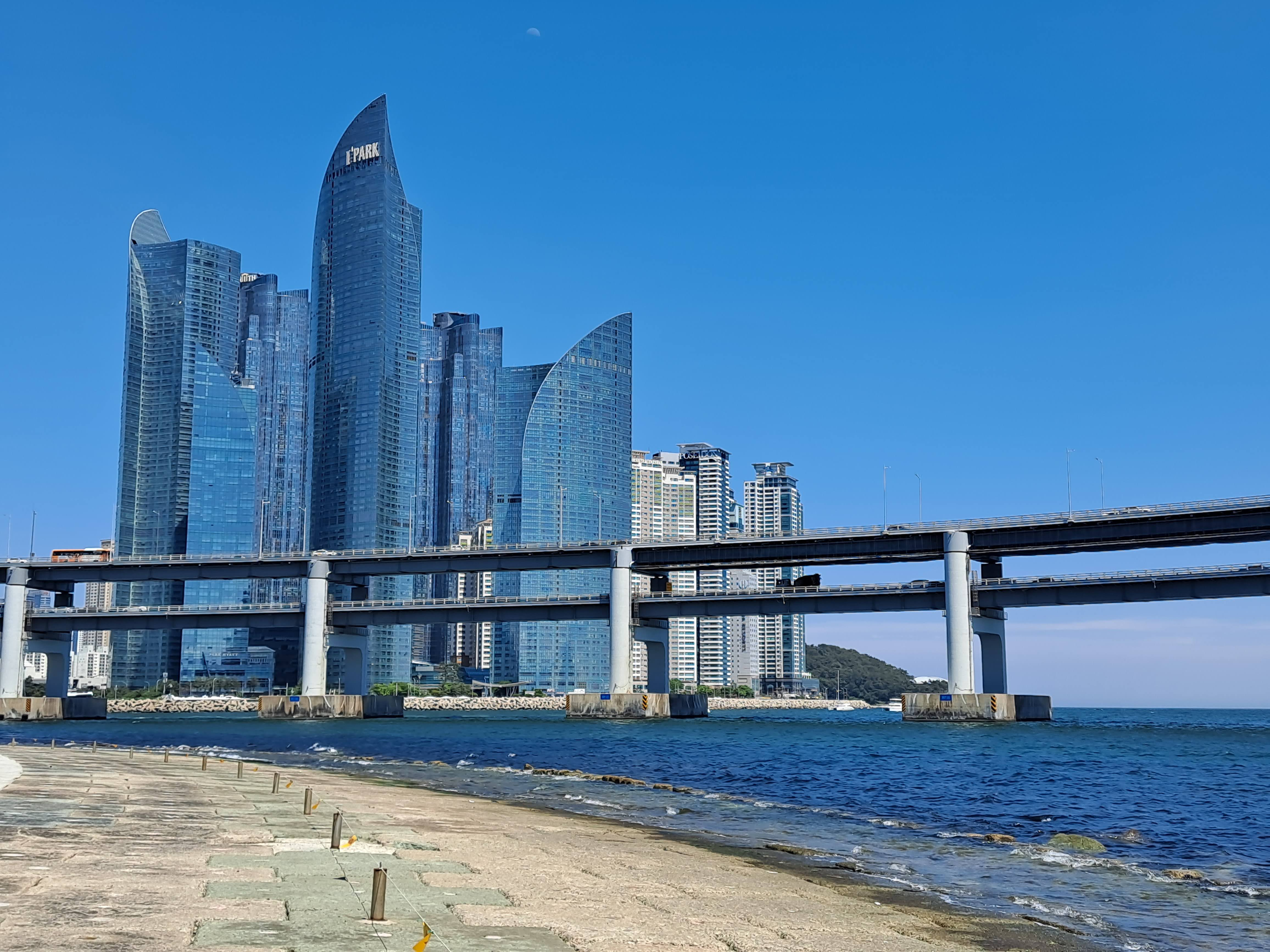
Haeundae Marine City

The Gwangbok-dong, Nampo-dong, and Jungang-dong areas form the old central business district. Some of the restaurants in this district use family recipes passed down through the generations. Jagalchi Market, a large seafood market, is located in this area. The Gukje Market is also nearby. Jungang-dong is the home of many international law offices, the old immigration office, and the international ferry terminal serving Japanese routes.

Busan has many major department stores, including Lotte Department Store (located in Seomyeon, Centum City, Gwangbok-dong and Dongnae), Lotte Premium Outlet (in Gimhae and Gijang), Shinsegae Premium Outlet (in Gijang), as well as large supermarket chains across the city, such as Homeplus, e-mart, and Costco.

Busan's major hotels include The Westin Chosun Busan, Paradise Busan, and Park Hyatt Busan. In 2017, Ananti Hilton Busan opened in the Gijang-eup district.

The announcement of the BTS Arirang world tour led to a surge in searches for Busan as a travel destination, leading to a potential boost in economy.

== Education ==
=== Universities with graduate schools ===
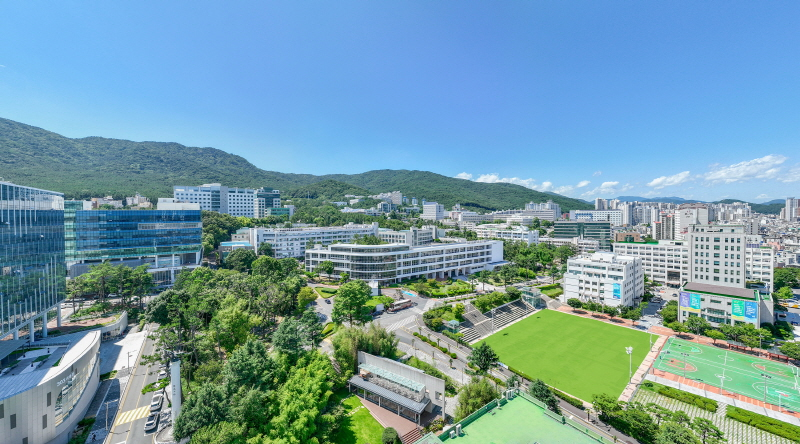
A panoramic view of Pusan National University.

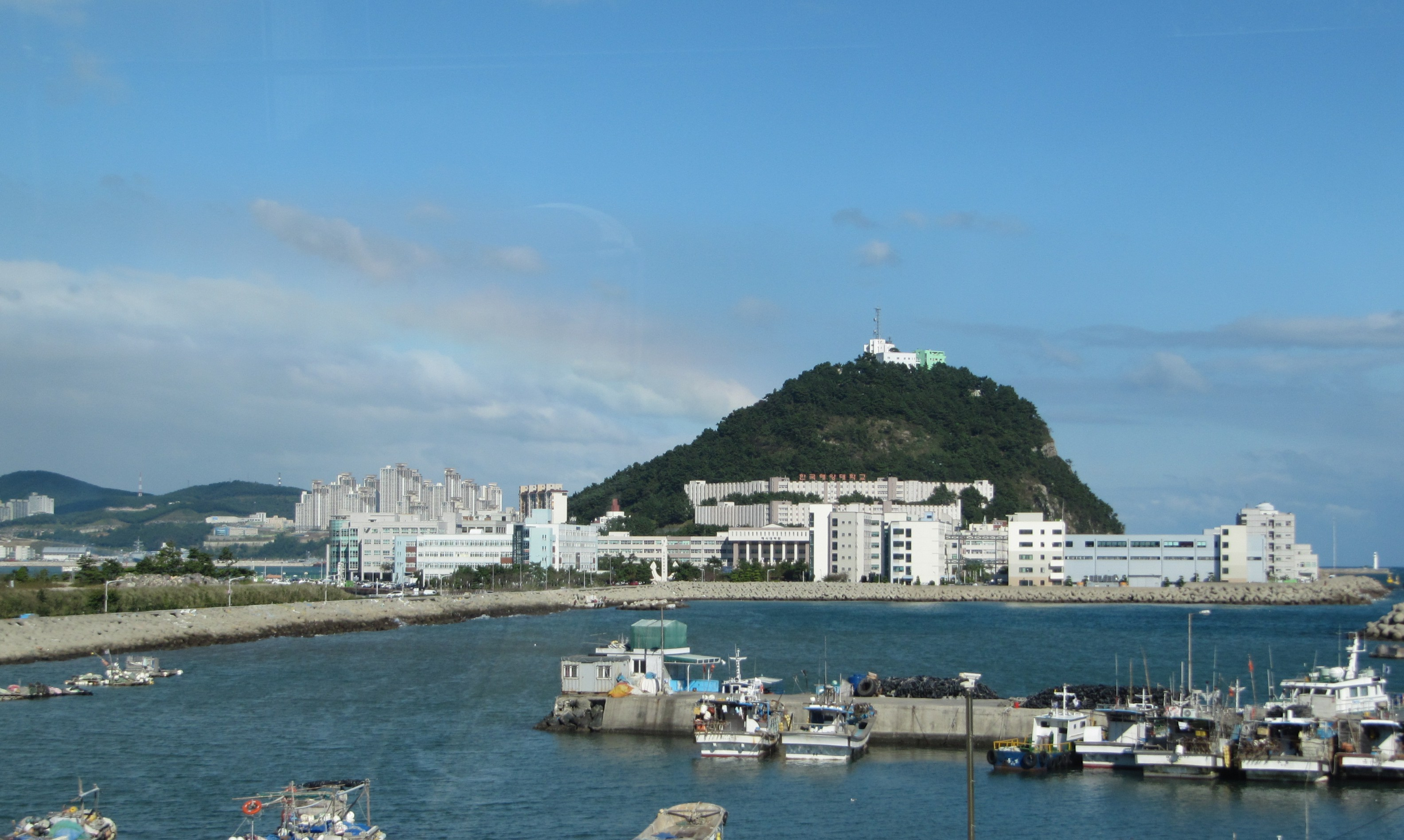
Korea Maritime and Ocean University.

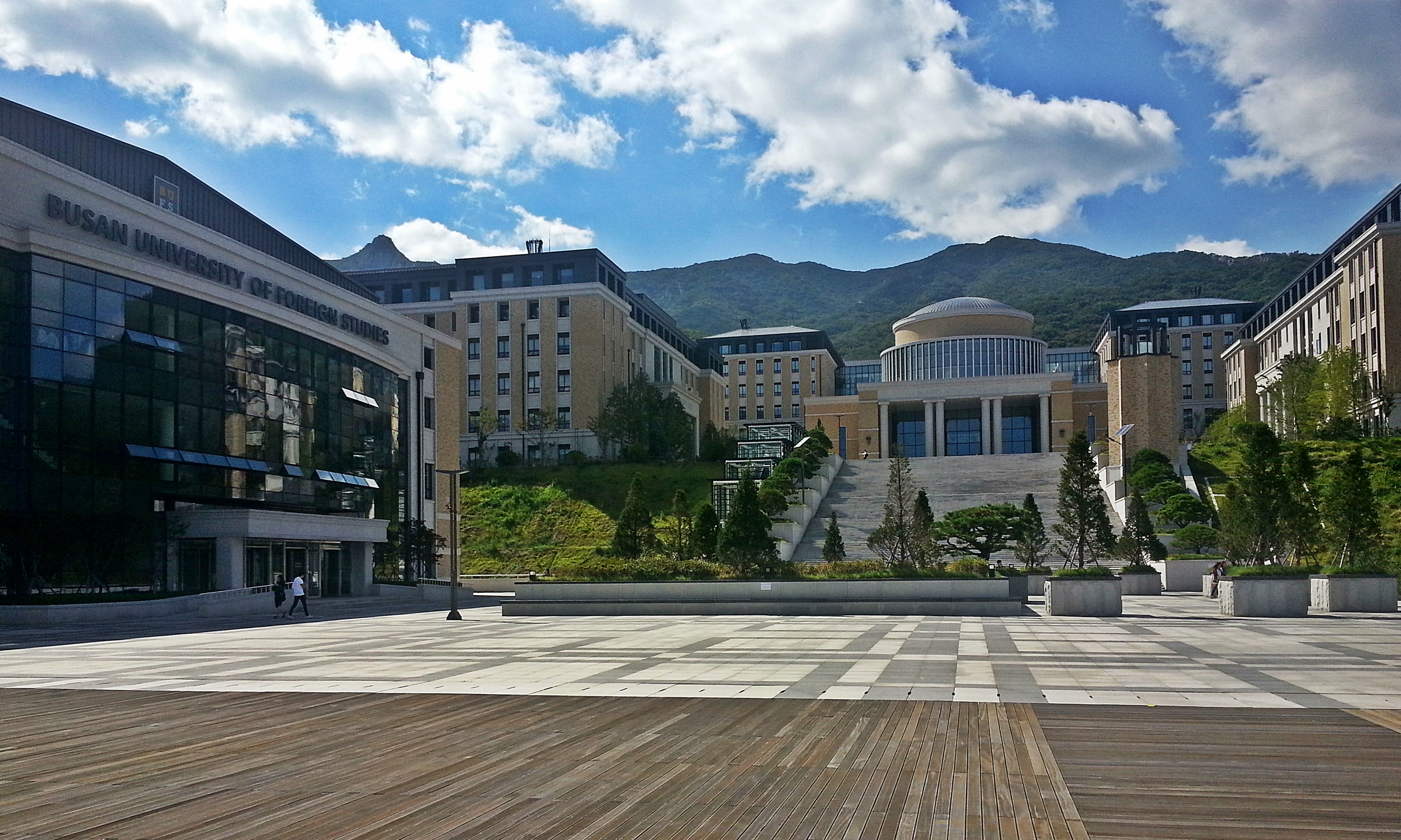
Busan University of Foreign Studies

- Busan University of Foreign Studies (BUFS)
- Busan Presbyterian University
- Busan National University of Education (BNUE)
- Catholic University of Pusan
- Dongseo University
- Dong-A University
- Dong-eui University
- Friedrich-Alexander University Busan Campus (German University in Korea)
- Inje University – Busan Campus
- Kosin University
- Korea Maritime and Ocean University
- Kyungsung University
- Pukyong National University (PKNU)
- Pusan National University (PNU)
- Silla University
- Tongmyong University
- Youngsan University

=== Other institutes of higher education ===
- Busan Arts College
- Busan Institute of Science and Technology (BIST)
- Busan Kyungsang College
- Busan Polytechnic College
- Daedong College
- Dong-Pusan College
- Dongju College
- Korea Institute of Maritime and Fisheries Technology
- Korean Reformed Theological Seminary, operated by the Korean Reformed Churches

=== Foreign schools ===
Primary and secondary schools:

- Busan Foreign Language High School (부산외국어고등학교)
- Busan Foreign School (Pre-Kindergarten through 12th Grade)
- Busan Japanese School (釜山日本人学校; 부산일본인학교)
- International School of Busan ( Pre-Kindergarten through 12th Grade)
- Overseas Chinese Elementary School Busan (韓國釜山華僑小學; 부산화교소학교)
- Overseas Chinese High School, Busan

=== High schools ===
- Keumjeong High School (1986)
- Kyeongwon High School (1986)
- Gaya High School

== Culture and attractions ==
Busan features a variety of antique and souvenir shops, restaurants, attractions and accommodations.

=== Parks, beaches, and highlights ===
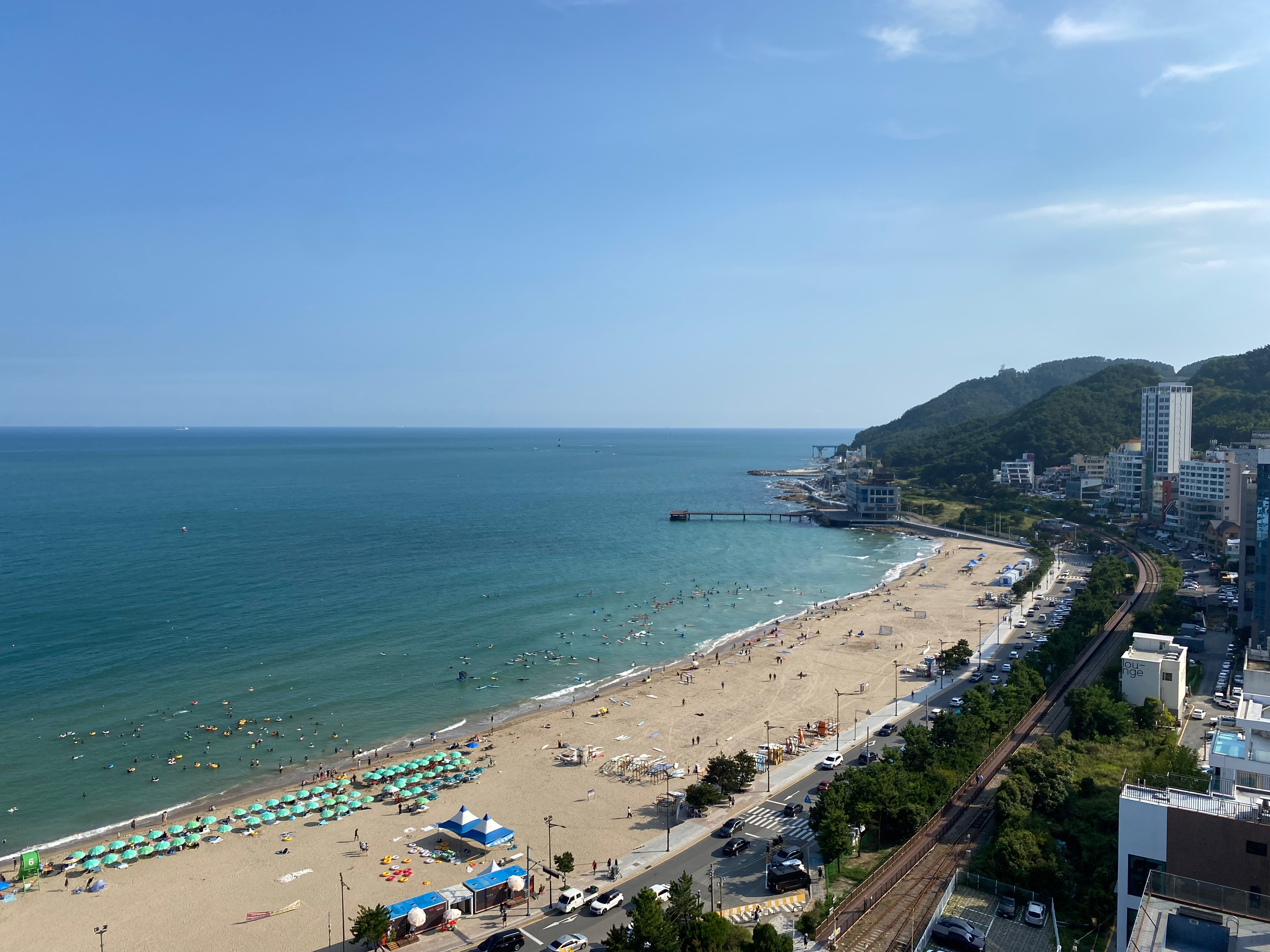
Songjeong beach facing south

Busan is called the summer capital of Korea, since it attracts tourists from all over the country to its six beaches. Luxury hotels and a carnival boardwalk line the beach at Haeundae. Gwangalli Beach has cafés, bars, and restaurants along the beach, and the Grand Gwangan Bridge. Other beaches include Dadaepo Beach on the west edge of the city and Songdo Beach, south of central Busan.

Haeundae Beach is Busan's most famous beach. It is a staple setting for South Korean films and TV shows, such as the 2009 film Tidal Wave. Dongbaekseom is located at the southern end of Haeundae Beach. This island is picturesque with a thick forest of camellias and pine trees. Tourist attractions on Dongbaek Island include a walking path and the Nurimaru APEC House, built for the 2005 APEC summit. Songjeong beach is the next beach north of Haeundae Beach.

Geumjeongsan to the west is a weekend hiking spot for Busan residents. To the north, the neighborhoods around Pusan National University (also known as PNU, which is one of the most highly recognized national institutes of higher education in Korea) have student theaters, cafés, bars, and restaurants, as well as open-air cultural street performances on weekend nights. Nearby is Beomeosa, the city's main Korean Buddhist temple.

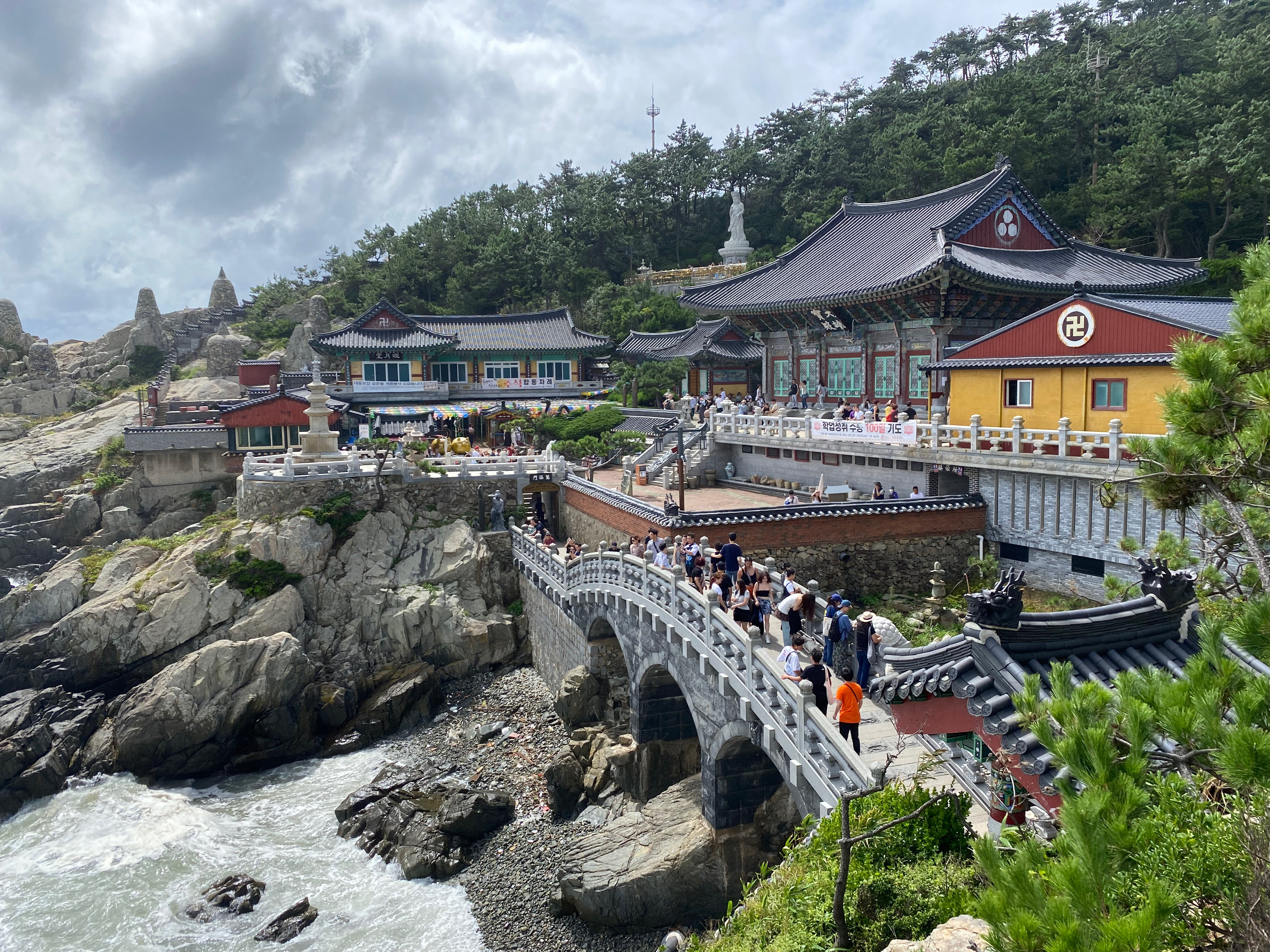
Haedong Yonggungsa

Yongdusan Park occupies 69,000m^{2}/17 acres (7 ha) and is home to the Busan Tower, Yongdusan Art Gallery, and the Busan Aquarium, the largest aquarium in South Korea. The park supports approximately seventy different species of trees and is a tourist destination, with various cultural events throughout the year.

Dongnae District is a wealthy and traditional residential area. Dongnae Oncheon is a natural spa area with many baths, tourist hotels, restaurants, clubs, and shopping areas. Many restaurants in the area use family recipes. Chungnyeolsa is a Confucian shrine for soldiers who died during the 16th-century battle against the Japanese at Dongnae Fortress.

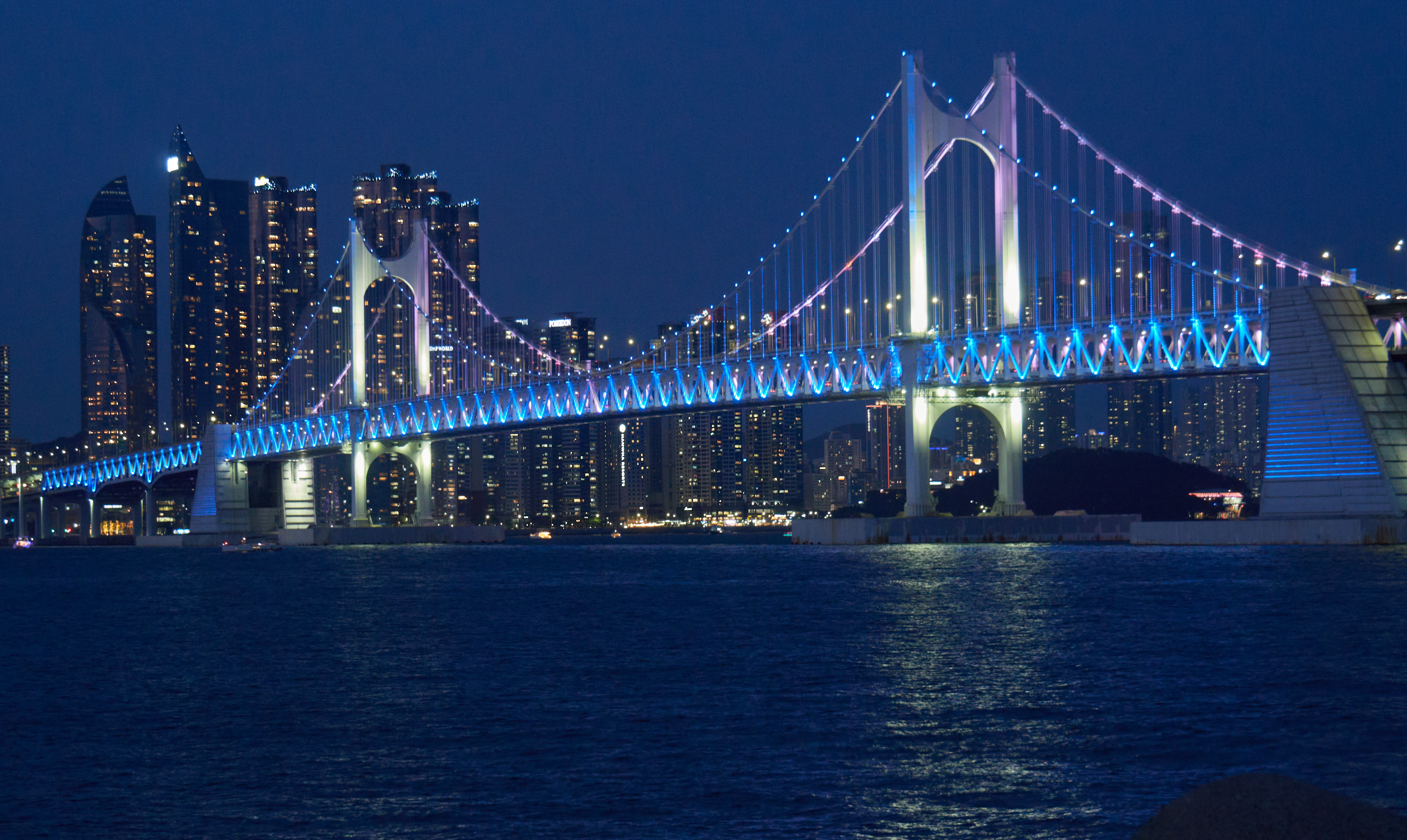
Gwangan Bridge illuminated at night

Taejongdae is a natural park with cliffs facing the open sea on the island of Yeongdo.

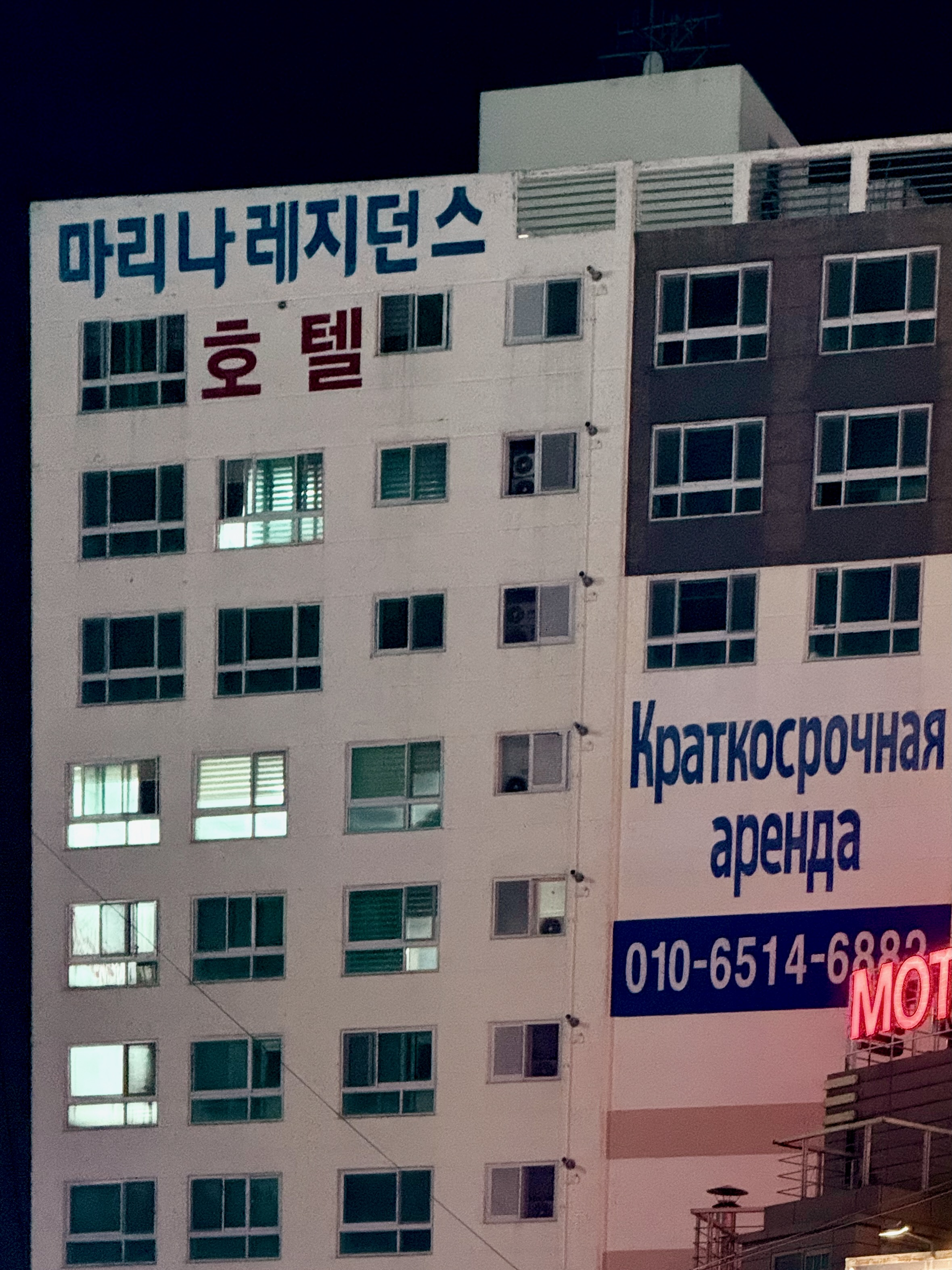
Sign in Russian in Busan on Texas Street

The area known as the "Foreigners' Shopping Street", but commonly referred to as "Texas Street" near part of the Port of Busan, and adjacent to the front entrance to the Busan Train Station (부산역) has many businesses that cater to the local Russian population, as well as the crews of foreign ships. The area was originally the location of the local Chinatown and still contains a Chinese school. The area originally served foreign sailors and American military personnel, but in the 1990s, with the growth of South Korea's ties with Russia and the countries of the former Soviet Union, large numbers of Russian-speaking traders and migrants arrived. This led to the emergence of cafes, shops, and services with Cyrillic signage.

Haedong Yonggung temple is one of three sacred places related to the Goddess Buddha.

Gamcheon Cultural Village was created in the 1950s as a residential community along a mountain slope. The houses in the village are built in a staircase fashion. The village often dubbed the "Machu Picchu of Korea" attracts many tourists. In addition, the village received a special mention during the 3rd edition of the international award ceremony, "UCLG-MEXICO CITY-Culture 21".

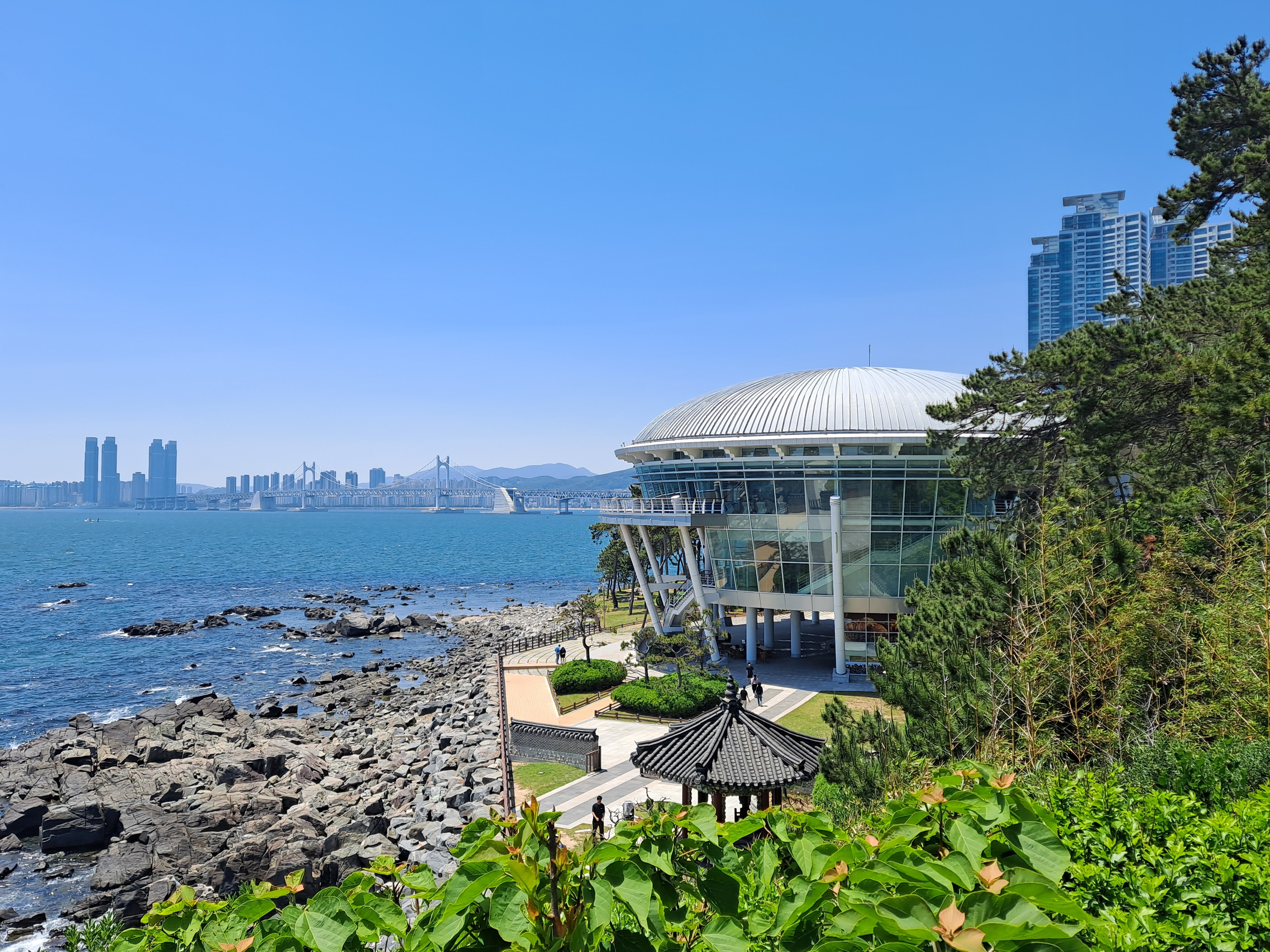
Gwangan Bridge, viewed from Dongbaek Island

Busan Citizens Park (formerly Camp Hialeah) is a former Imperial Japanese Army base and United States Army camp located in the Busanjin District. Huinnyeoul Culture Village was created when Korean War refugees flocked to this area. It provides an unhindered view of both the Busanhang and Namhang Ports. A major backdrop of the 2013 film The Attorney, the neighborhood was also featured in the 2012 film Nameless Gangster: Rules of the Time. The small houses that stand shoulder to shoulder form the signature look of Busan, which is often remembered as a city of the sea and hilly neighborhoods. The village continues to attract an increasing number of visitors with its new cafes, workshops, and guesthouses.

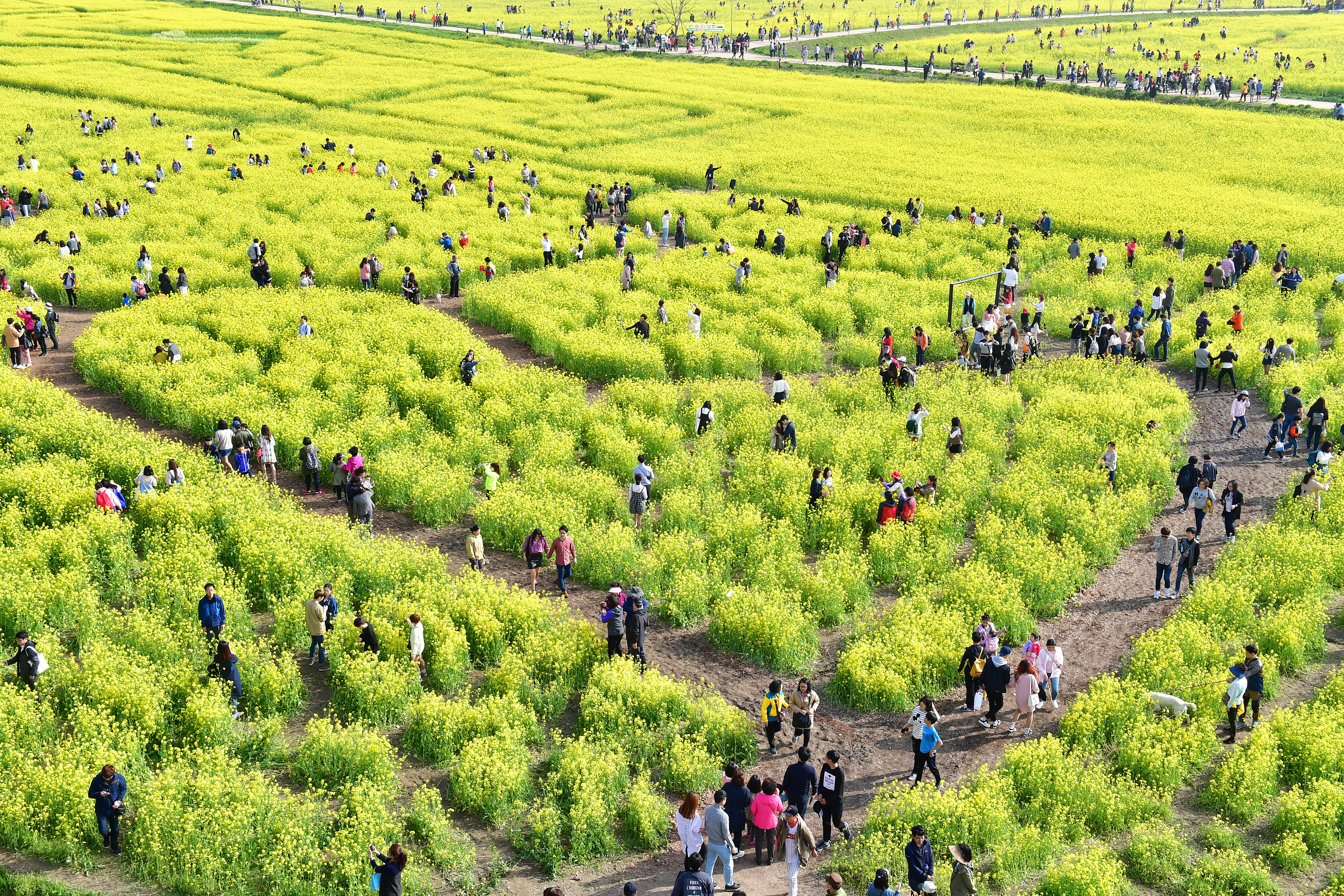
Daejeo Ecological Park

Millac Waterfront Park is the first waterfront park in Korea, combines the oceanfront with public leisure facilities. The park is located between Haeundae Beach and Gwangalli Beach. The waterfront park, with an area of 33,507 m^{3}, can accommodate as many as 40,000 visitors. The floor of the park is decorated with colorful blocks, and the park provides visitors a perfect chance to relax and features flower gardens, gazebos and benches. If you sit on the 3,040–wide stand, you can dip your feet in the water during high tide.

Nampo-dong is a central shopping and café district. The area around Pukyong National University and Kyungsung University also has many cafés, bars, and restaurants attracting college students and youth.

With a length of 7.62 km (4.73 mi) and a size of 2.66 km^{2} (1.03 sq mi), designated as Natural Monument No. 179, Daejeo Ecological Park is a habitat for migratory birds at the Nakdong River Estuary. The estuary was chosen as a trial project for the Four Major Rivers Restoration Project. The sports facilities were partially built on the upper and lower parts of the park only, while the rest of the park underwent a restoration of its wetlands and natural grassland. In the garden inside the park, you can find a large-scale habitat for prickly water lilies, which are part of the Endangered Species Level II classification. Many interesting festivals, such as the Nakdong Riverside Cherry Blossom Festival, the Busan Nakdong River Canola Flower Festival, and the Daejeo Tomato Festival are held around this park every year.

Ilgwang Beach is a long white-sand beach, extending for about 1.8 kilometers, and is particularly popular among families with young children as a vacation spot because the waters are quite shallow. Every summer, the Gaetmaeul Outdoor Drama Festival is held on this beach. The festival features diverse performances of traditional Korean music, outdoor dramas, mime shows, and other performance art forms.

Kiswire Museum offers its visitors a chance to better understand wire, a key material for industrial development, and central to Kiswire's corporate philosophy. The museum won the 2014 Busan Architecture Award for its aesthetic design. In addition, the roof of the museum is supported by only 38 cables without any pillars or beams, which makes the museum quite unique. In addition, the museum features special art pieces, including artwork made with wires.

Jeonpo Café Street, a former hardware district in Busanjin-gu has been transformed into a cafe hub, and was highlighted in the New York Times's selection of Busan as one of its "52 Places to Go" in 2017.

=== Temples, religious and historical sites ===
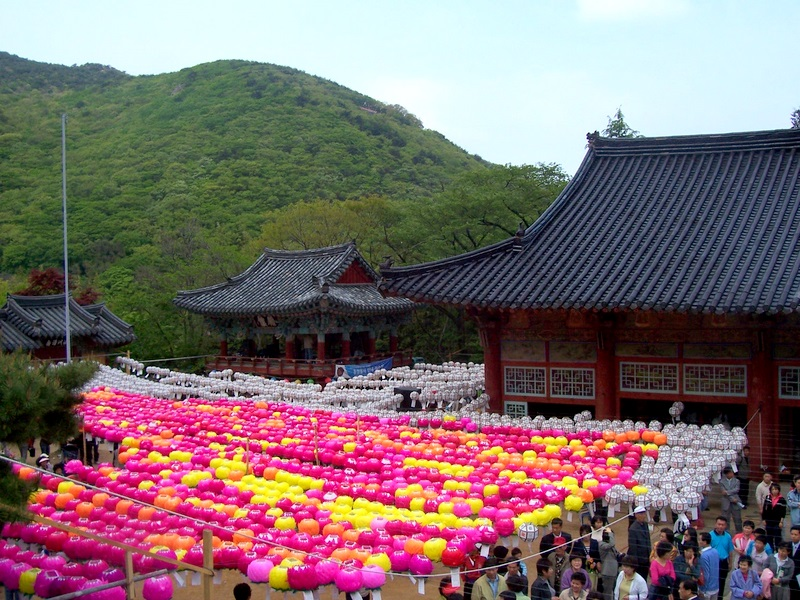
Beomeosa

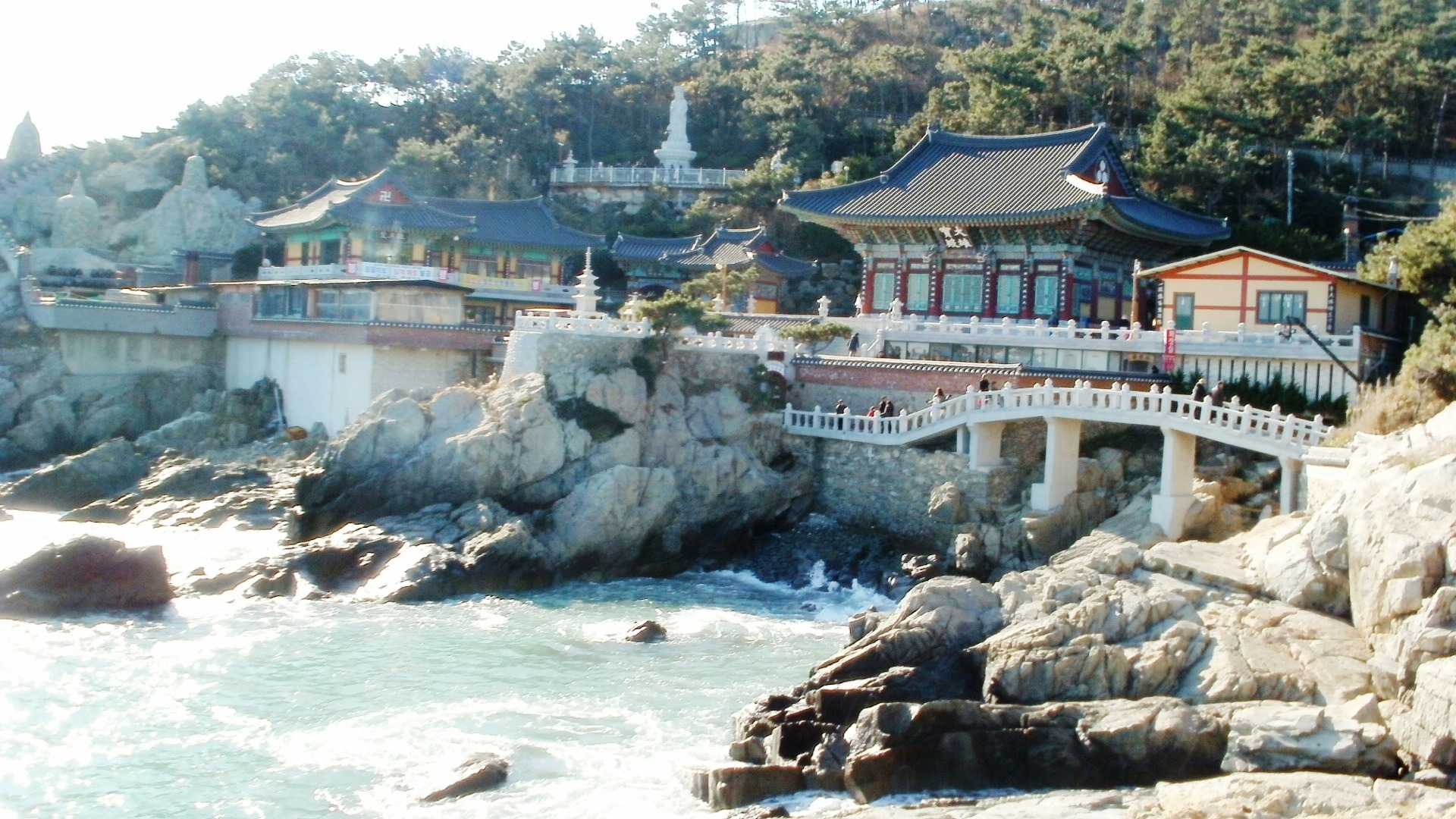
Haedong Yonggungsa

- Beomeosa Temple
- Busanjinjiseong Fortress (or Jaseongdae)
- Cheonseongjinseong Fortress
- Chungnyeolsa Shrine
- Dongnaeeupseong Fortress
- Dongnae Hyanggyo Confucian shrine-school
- Dongnaebu Dongheon
- Dongsam-dong Shell Mound
- Fortress site of Jwasuyeong
- Geumjeongsanseong Fortress
- Haedong Yonggungsa
- Janggwancheong
- Gungwancheong
- Songgongdan Altar
- Jeongongdan Altar
- Samgwangsa Temple
- Tumuli in Bokcheon-dong, Dongnae
- United Nations Memorial Cemetery
- Waeseong in Jukseong-ri, Gijang
- Yeongdo Bridge
- Yeonggadae Pavilion
- Yungongdan Altar

=== Arts ===
Busan Cinema Center, Dureraum.

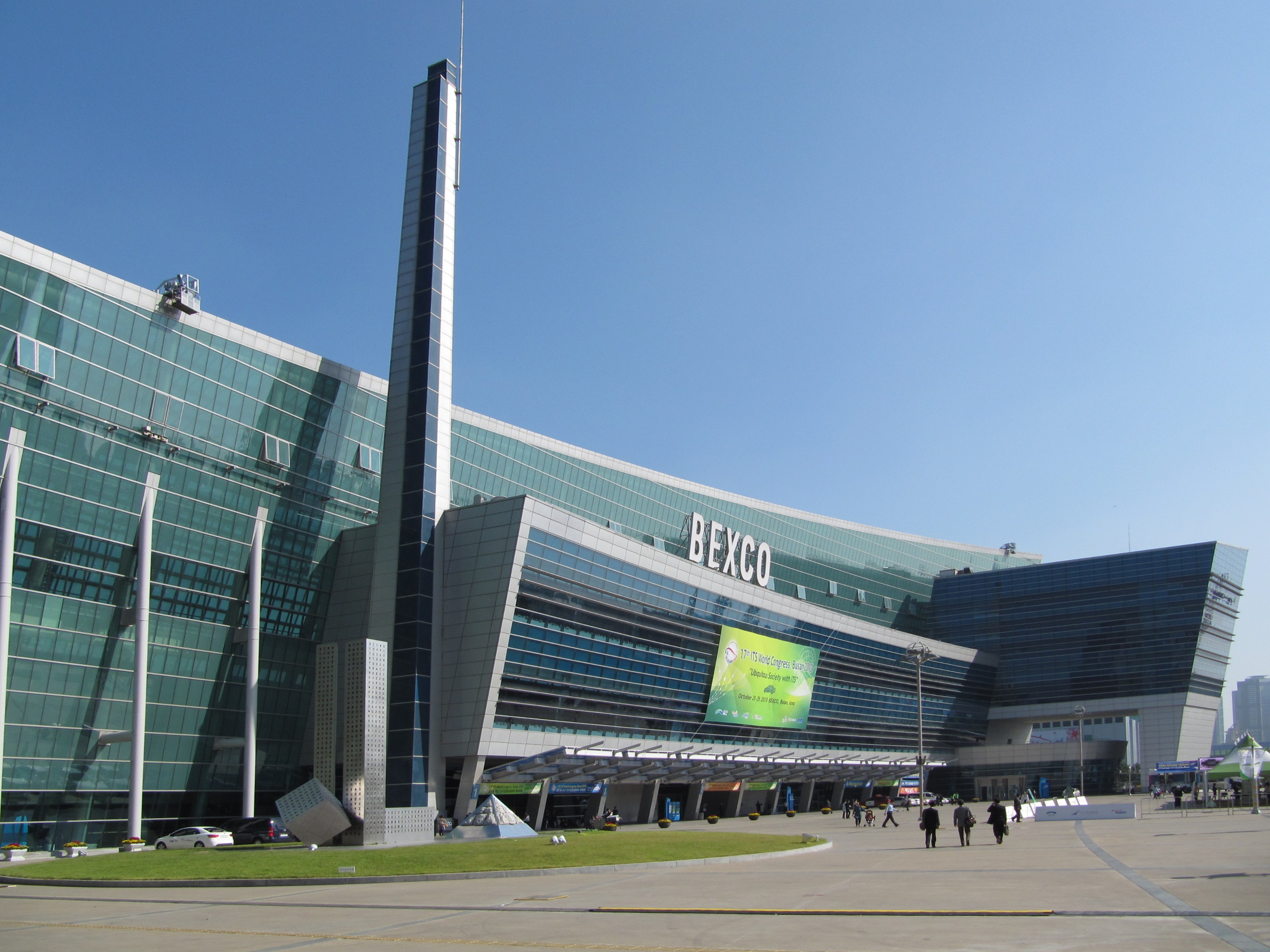
Busan Exhibition and Convention Center

Busan hosts the Busan International Film Festival (BIFF)—one of the most popular international film festivals in Asia—at the Busan Cinema Center every fall. Busan is also the home of the Busan Biennale, as an international contemporary art biennale that takes place every two years.

The city also hosts the One Asia Festival, the largest K-pop festival in Korea beginning in 2016, positioning itself as the center of K-pop culture.

In 2012, German artist Hendrik Beikirch painted Asia's tallest mural entitled "Fisherman Portrait" on a building near Millak Raw Fish Town.

Busan is home to 80 performance facilities consisting of 30 public ones, including the Busan Cultural Center, Busan Citizens' Hall, Busan Cinema Center, and Busan National Gugak Center. There are 40 private facilities, such as KBS Art Hall Busan, Sohyang Art Center, MBC Samjoo Art Hall, Kyungsung University Concert Hall, and Shinsegae Department Store Culture Hall.

=== Festivals ===
A variety of festivals are held in the Busan throughout the year. Following the Joseon Tongsinsa Festival (Registration of Documents on Joseon Tongsinsa on the UNESCO Memory of the World Programme in 2017) and Busan Port Festival in May, the Busan Sea Festival at Haeundae Beach, the largest beach in Korea, and the Busan International Rock Festival takes place in August. In particular, October is the perfect month to enjoy a variety of festivals, such as the Busan International Film Festival, the largest film festival in Asia, the Busan Fireworks Festival, and the One Asia Festival, a global K-pop music festival. In addition, G-Star, the largest gaming exhibition in Korea, and the e-Sports World Championship are hosted in November, followed by the Busan Christmas Tree Festival in December.

Major Public performance facilities

No.	Facility	Number of Seats
1	Busan Cultural Center	2,389
2	Busan Citizens' Hall	1,941
3	BEXCO Auditorium	2,644
4	Busan National Gugak Center	974
5	Busan Cinema Center Haneulyeon Theatre	841
6	Korea National Maritime Museum	311

=== Museums ===
Museums in Busan include:

- Busan Museum
- Busan Museum of Art
- Museum of Contemporary Art Busan
- Busan Museum of Movies
- Busan Modern History Museum
- Busan Marine Natural History Museum
- Korea National Maritime Museum
- Bokcheon Museum
- Kiswire Museum
- Provisional Capital Memorial Hall
- Trickeye Museum
- United Nations Peace Memorial Hall
- 40-step Stairway Culture Center
- Dongnae Eupseong History Museum

=== Traditional cuisine ===
Busan was once a center of military affairs in the southern region of the peninsula and therefore was an important site for diplomatic relationships with Japan; high-ranking officers and officials from the court frequently visited the city. Special foods were prepared for the officers such as Dongnae pajeon (동래파전), a variant of pajeon (Korean savory pancakes), made with whole scallions, sliced chili peppers, and various kinds of seafood in a thick batter of wheat flour, glutinous rice flour, eggs, salt and water.

During the Korean War, Busan was the biggest refugee destination on the peninsula; people from all regions of Korea went there. Some of these refugees stayed and adapted the recipes of their local specialties. One of these foods is milmyeon (밀면) (lit. 'wheat noodle') a version of naengmyeon, cold buckwheat noodle soup, but using wheat flour instead. (Naengmyeon is originally a specialty food of Hamhung and Pyongyang, now part of North Korea.) Dwaeji gukbap (돼지국밥) (lit. 'pork/pig soup rice') is also a result of Korean War. It is a hearty pork soup and is becoming more popular nationwide. Pork trotters served with vegetables such as cucumbers, onions, and mustard sauce is popular and is called Nangchae-Jokbal.

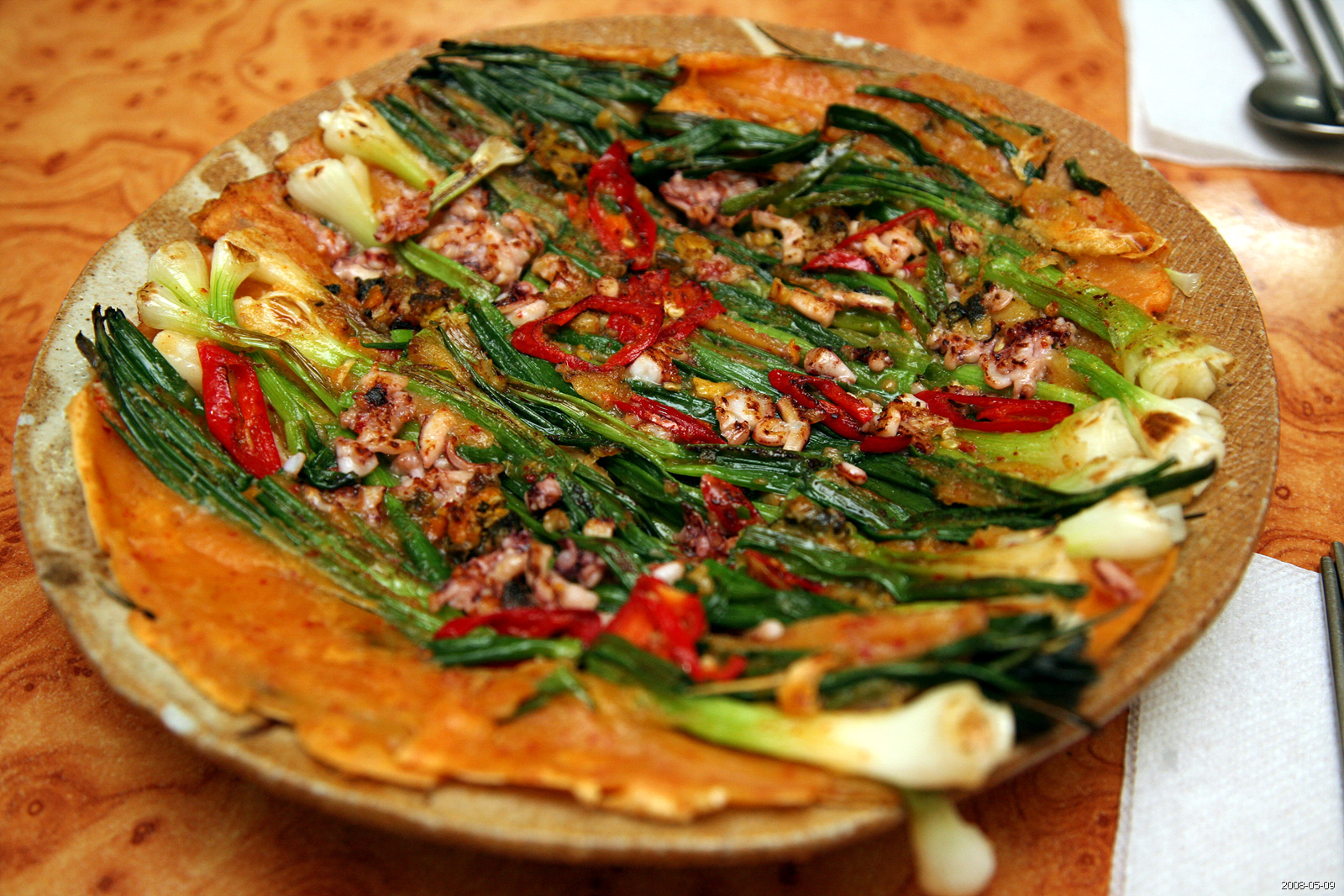
Dongnae pajeon

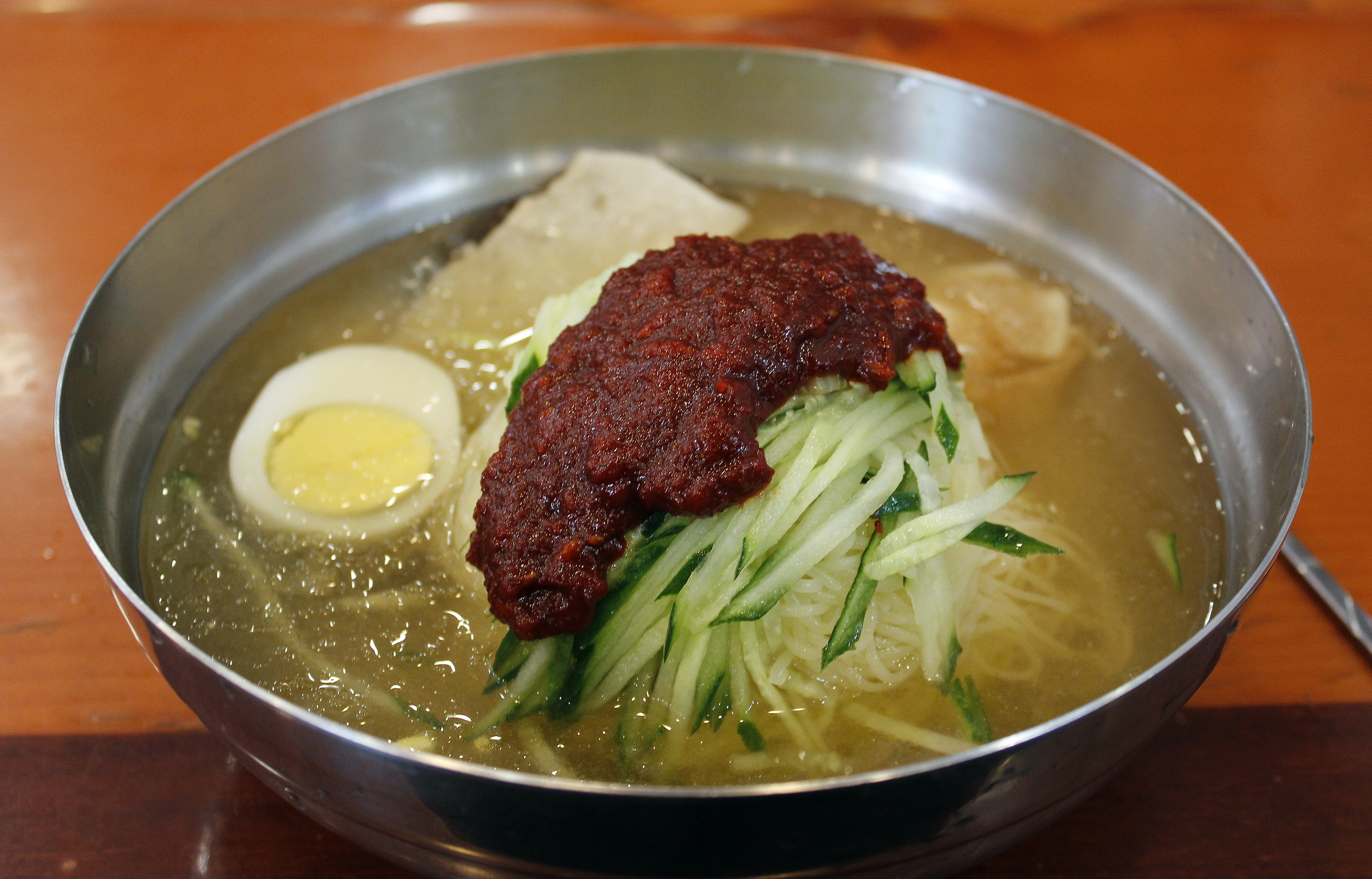
Milmyeon

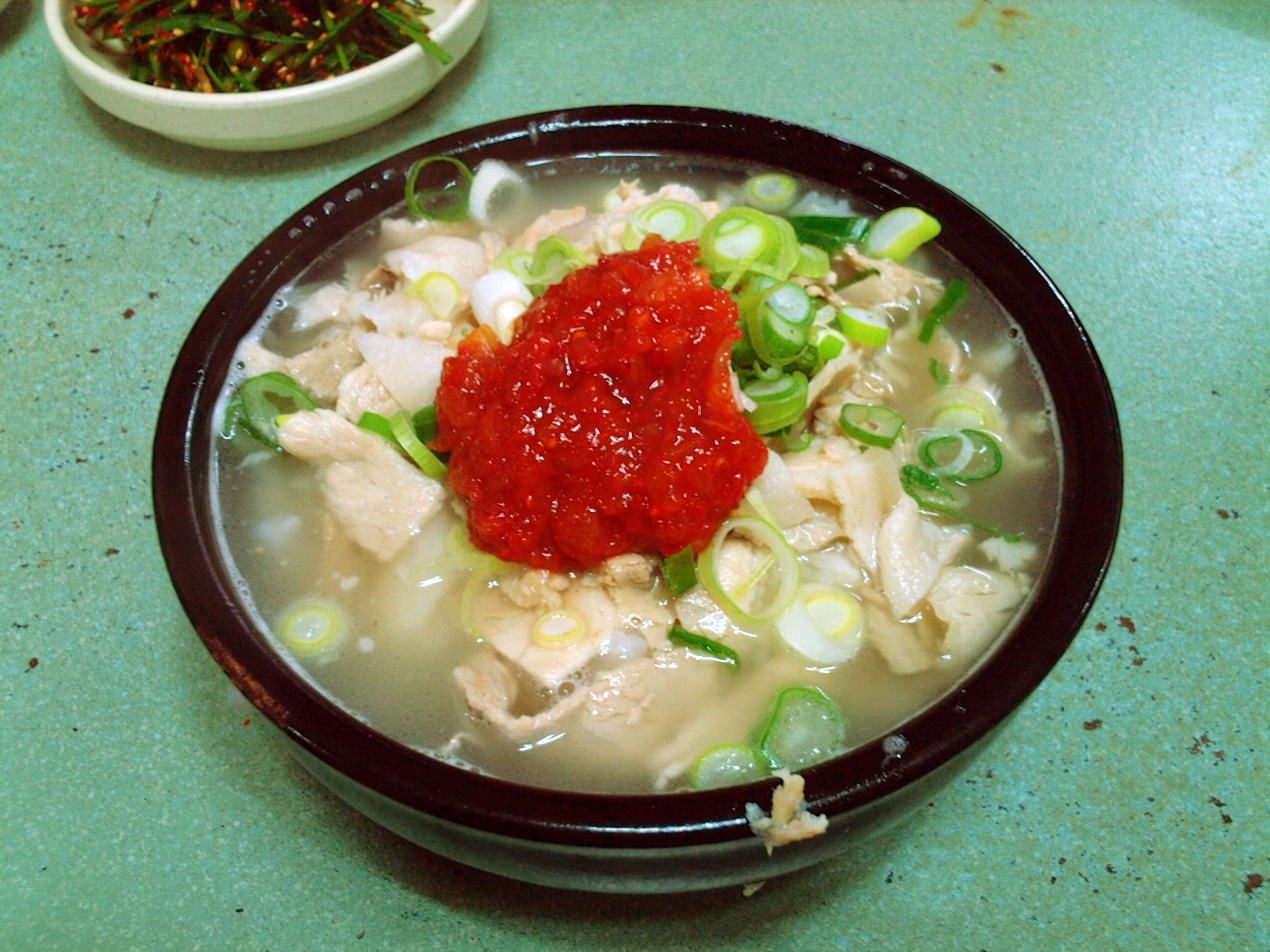
Dwaeji gukbap

=== Hot spring resorts and spas ===
Busan has the largest hot spring resorts and facilities in Korea. Busan's Oncheon is the oldest hot spring spa in Korea.

- Spa Land (Haeundae District)
- HurShimChung Hot Spring Resorts and Spa Town (Dongnae District)
- Haeundae Hot Spring Resorts and Spa Towns (Haeundae District)
- Dongnae Hot Spring Resorts and Spa Towns (Dongnae District)
- Gwangalli Spa Towns (Suyeong District)

=== Media ===
Station or Newspaper	Types
Busan KBS	TV, Radio
Busan MBC	TV, Radio
KNN	TV, Radio
Busan CBS	Radio
Busan BBS	Radio
Busan eFM	Radio (English, Chinese)
Busan PBC	Radio
Busan Ilbo	Daily Newspaper
The Kookje Daily News	Daily Newspaper

=== In popular culture ===
Although Seoul remains the de facto film and television capital of South Korea, Busan shares more in common with Cannes, France than just its reputation as seaside resort town.

The Busan International Film Festival is often referred to as the "Cannes of Asia", attracting thousands of entertainment personalities from both Eastern and Western cinema every year, honoring and recognizing international luminaries such as Mike Leigh, Shōhei Imamura, Wong Kar-wai, and Kim Ki-duk.

It is frequently used as a film location, best known in the west for Marvel's Black Panther and Apple's Pachinko, but also for the Korean market productions of Train to Busan, Old Boy, and Decision to Leave, as well as the popular K-Drama Reply 1997, highlighting the distinct Gyeongsang dialect, which is comparable to a Scottish English in relation to standard British English.

Works set in Busan tend to be crime noirs. Additionally, Busan often appears as an escape location or disaster area. Stories where characters escape to Busan to flee accidents or disasters in Seoul and then escape overseas are quite common clichés in Korean disaster films. Train to Busan carries out an escape to Busan, as the title suggests.

The establishment of the Busan Film Commission in 1999 marked the city's emergence as a major filming destination beyond Seoul. In the early 2000s, it was relatively easy to obtain permits for road closures and explosion scenes in Busan that would have been impossible in Seoul. Thanks to active support from the city, word of mouth started in the film industry, leading to a preference for filming in the Busan area. In particular, the 2009 film Haeundae was a box office success with over 10 million attendees.

== Demographics ==
Historical population
Year	Pop.	±%
1950	947,770	—
1960	1,154,129	+21.8%
1970	1,842,259	+59.6%
1980	3,159,766	+71.5%
1990	3,798,113	+20.2%
2000	3,662,884	−3.6%
2010	3,414,950	−6.8%
2020	3,349,016	−1.9%

Busan population pyramid in 2022

Between 1945 and 1951, the city's population grew from 280,000 to 840,000. It decreased from 3,513,777 in 2015 to 3,266,598 in 2024. This decline, which accelerated in the 1990s, is attributed to South Korea's economic shift towards high-tech industries, concentrated around Seoul, and away from Busan's traditional manufacturing base.

=== Religion ===
Religion in Busan (2024)
1. Not religious (45.0%)
2. Buddhism (29.0%)
3. Protestantism (14.0%)
4. Catholicism (7.00%)
5. Others (5.00%)

In 2024, 29% followed Buddhism and 21% followed Christianity (14% Protestantism and 7% Catholicism), and 5% other religions. 45% of the population is irreligious.

== Sports ==
The city planned to bid for the 2020 Summer Olympics, but withdrew after the 2018 Winter Olympics were awarded to Pyeongchang, also located in South Korea. The 2020 Summer Olympics were eventually awarded to Tokyo. It considered bidding to host the 2032 Summer Olympics.

Within domestic sports, Busan gained a reputation as something of a "cursed city". While the term "sports curse" is not commonly used in Korean, the failures of its local teams during the 2000s and 2010s have been well-documented and their long-suffering passionate fans often been humorously highlighted by the media. KBO League team Lotte Giants have not won a Korean Series title since the 1990s while K League original member Daewoo Royals (later Busan IPark) went through ownership changes and was relegated to the second division in 2015, ending over three decades in the top division. The last time a Busan team had won a title was in 1997, when Kia won the inaugural KBL Championship and Daewoo Royals won the K League title. Professional basketball teams Busan KCC Egis (men) and Busan BNK Sum (women) ended the drought in 2024 and 2025 respectively by winning their respective championships, the latter becoming the first ever Busan-based franchise to win its championship title at home and coincidentally with a Busan native as its head coach. Such was the significance of Busan KCC Egis's win that it gained extensive national media coverage and the Championship-winning team was personally honored by the Mayor.

Sports teams and facilities

Club	League	Stadium	Stadium Capacity	Sports Type
Lotte Giants	KBO League	Sajik Baseball Stadium	28,500	Baseball
Busan IPark	K League 2	Busan Gudeok Stadium	12,349	Football
Busan BNK Sum	WKBL	Sajik Arena	14,099	Basketball
Busan KCC Egis	KBL	Sajik Arena	14,099	Basketball

=== Baseball ===
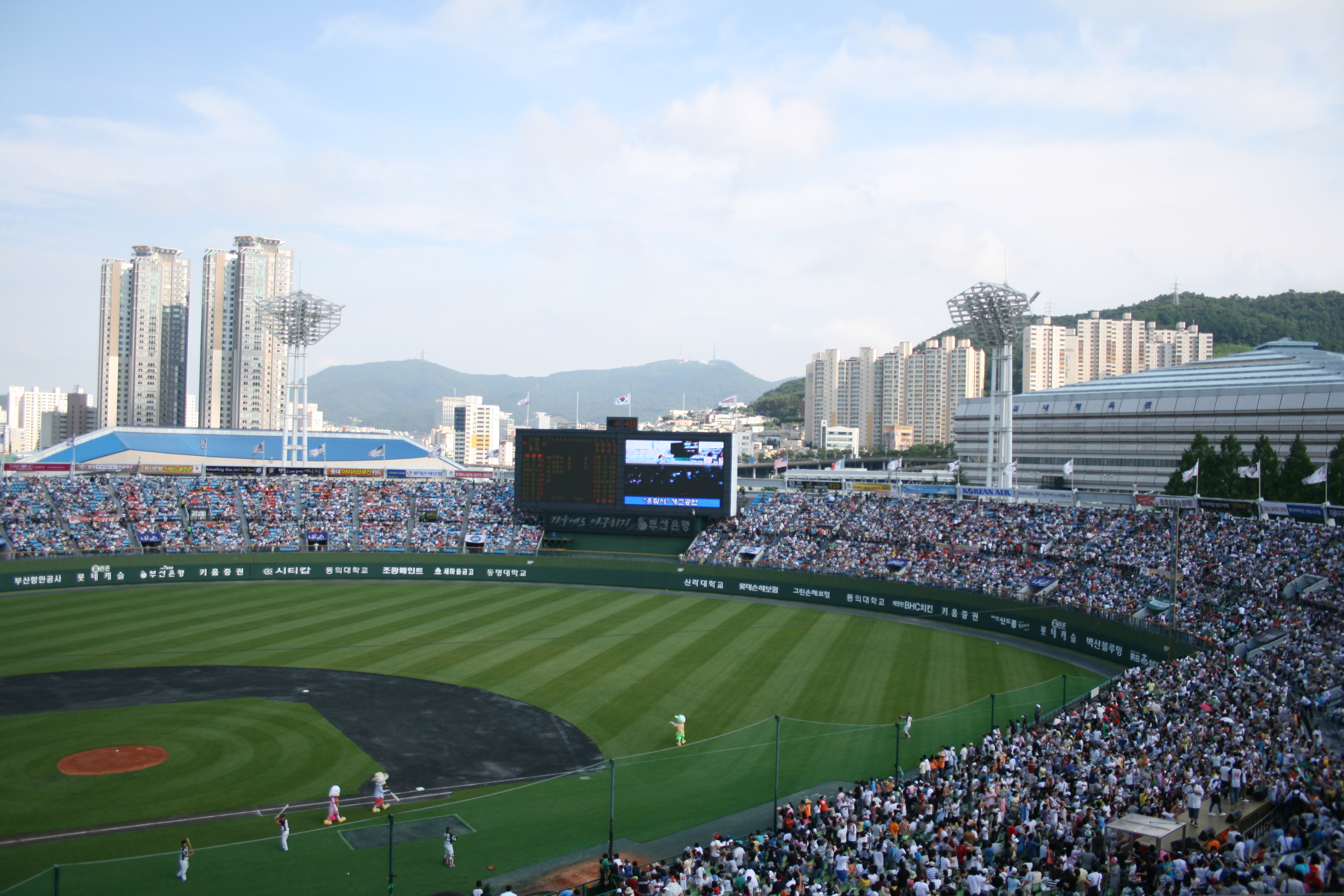
Sajik Baseball Stadium

Since 1982, the city has been home to the Lotte Giants, who play in the Korea Professional Baseball league. In Korea, Busan is known as the capital of baseball and has a reputation for very enthusiastic baseball fans. For the first few years, the Lotte Giants utilized Gudeok Baseball Stadium as their home. In the mid-1980s, they moved to Sajik Baseball Stadium, which was built as part of a sports complex for the 1986 Asian Games.

=== Football ===
The city is home to a K League football club, the Busan IPark. The club was formerly known as the Busan Daewoo Royals and was a successful team during the 1990s. Busan is also home to a K3 League football club, the Busan Transportation Corporation.

=== Basketball ===
Sajik Arena is the city's basketball venue and is shared by both Korean Basketball League and Women's Korean Basketball League teams. It is currently home to Busan KCC Egis (KBL) and Busan BNK Sum (WKBL). Busan BNK Sum previously used the Geumjeong Gymnasium from 2019 to 2021 before moving to Sajik Arena. KBL franchises that formerly used Sajik Arena include KT Sonicboom (moved to Suwon) and Kia Enterprise (moved to Ulsan and became Ulsan Hyundai Mobis Phoebus).

=== 2002 FIFA World Cup ===
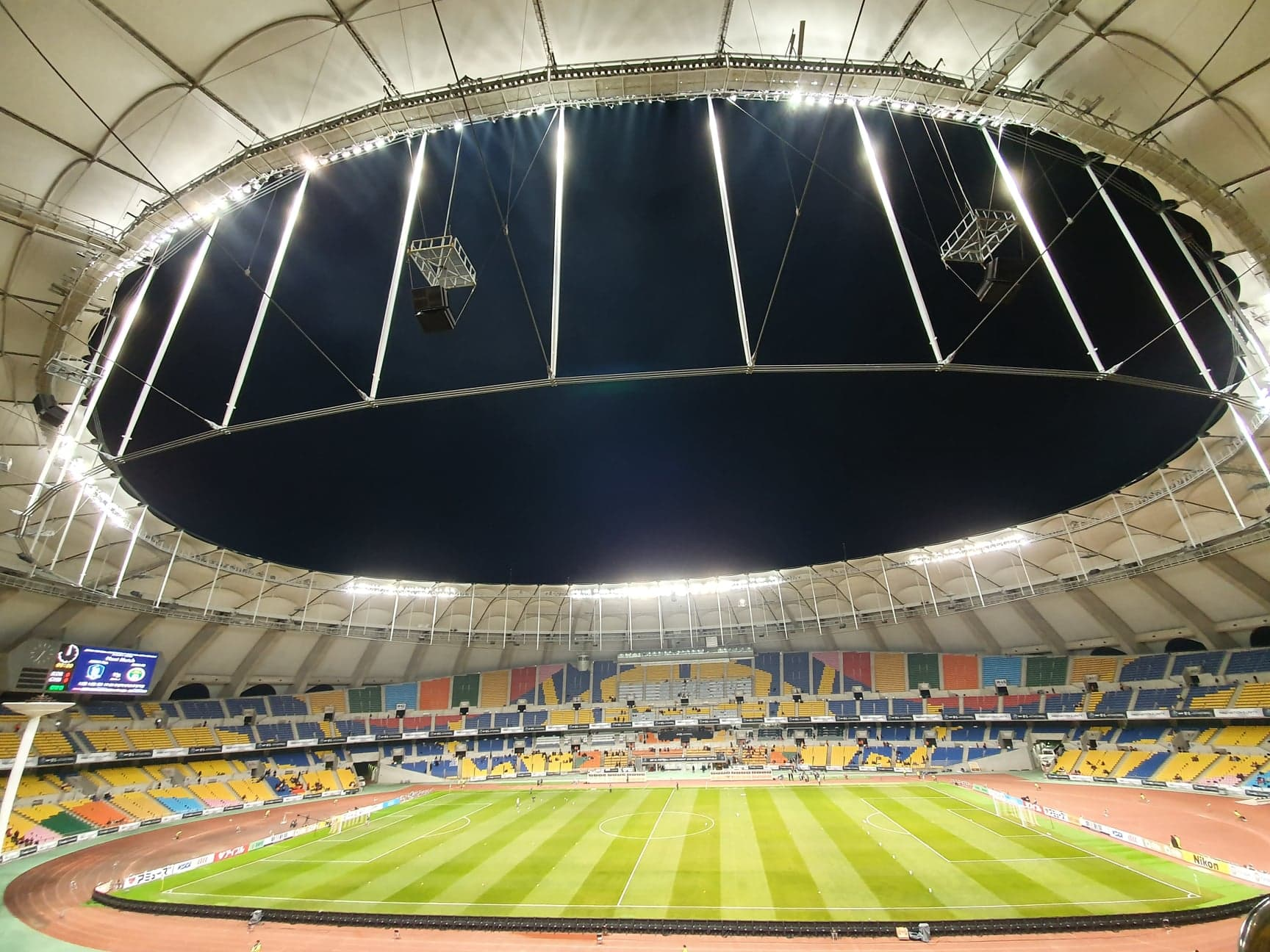
Busan Asiad Main Stadium.

The 2002 FIFA World Cup was the world's 17th FIFA World Cup, held from 31 May to 30 June 2002 at locations in South Korea and Japan. Busan hosted matches between France and Uruguay, and ROK against Poland at the Busan Asiad Stadium.

=== 2002 Asian Games ===
The 2002 Asian Games were held in Busan from September 29 to October 14, 2002. 9,900 athletes from 44 countries competed in 38 sports. Many public sports complexes and university gymnasiums, including Busan Asiad Stadium were used for the games' venues. The mascot was a seagull, the city bird of Busan named, "Duria". East Timor took part in the games for the first time. As well, North Korea also participated for the first time in an international event held in South Korea.

== Festivals and events ==
Busan celebrates festivals all year round.

Month	Annual Festivals and Events
January	Busan Sunrise Festival, Polar Bear Swimming Contest
April	Gwangalli Fishery (Eobang) Festival, Busan Nakdong River Yuchae (Canola) Flower Festival
May	Busan Motor Show, Busan Port Festival, Busan Contents Market, Busan International Short Film Festival, Joseon Tongsinsa Korea-Japan Exchange Festival, Busan International Performing Arts Festival
June	Haeundae Sand Festival, Busan International Dance Festival, Art Busan
July	Busan International Kids and Youth Film Festival,
August	Busan Sea Festival, Busan International Rock Festival, Busan International Magic Festival, Busan International Advertising Festival, Busan International Comedy Festival
September	Busan Biennale, Busan Sea Art Festival, Busan Maru International Music Festival, Busan Queer Festival
October	Busan International Film Festival, Busan International Fireworks Festival, Busan Jagalchi Festival, Asia Song Festival, Busan One-Asia Festival, The Dongnae-eupseong History Festival
November	G-Star-Global Game Exhibition, Busan Choral Festival & Competition
December	Busan Christmas Tree Festival

== Medical facilities ==
Busan has many hospitals and clinics. Many cosmetic surgery, dermatological, ophthalmic, and dental clinics are concentrated in Seomyeon medical street.

Hospitals in Busan include Pusan National University Hospital with 1,300 beds in Ami-dong, Kosin University Gospel Hospital with 957 beds in Amnam-dong, Dongnam Institute of Radiological & Medical Sciences specializing in cancer treatment with 298 beds, Dong-A University Hospital with 999 beds in Dongdaesin-dong, Dong-eui Medical Center with 468 beds offering cooperative western and oriental medicine treatment in Yangjeong-dong, Inje University Busan Paik Hospital with 837 beds in Gaegeum-dong, Inje University Haeundae Paik Hospital with 896 beds in Jwa-dong, Busan Medical Center with 555 beds in Sajik-dong and Busan Veterans Hospital in Jurye-dong, Sasang District. In particular, Seomyeon Medical Street has formed a cluster of 370 medical institutions specializing in cosmetic surgery, dermatology, ophthalmology, and dentistry. The "Seomyeon Medical Street Festival" has taken place annually since 2012.

=== Major medical centers ===
Name of Hospital	Number of beds
Pusan National University Hospital at Busan	1180
Inje University Paik Hospital at Haeundae	1004
Dong-A University Hospital	920
Kosin University Hospital	912
Busan St. Mary's Medical Center	716
Dong-eui Medical Center	640
Busan Baptist Hospital	608
Busan Medical Center	591
Maryknoll Medical Center	501
Inje University Paik Hospital at Busan	898
Wallace Memorial Baptist Hospital	380
Dongnam Institute of Radiological and Medical Sciences Cancer Center	304

== Transportation ==
=== Bus ===
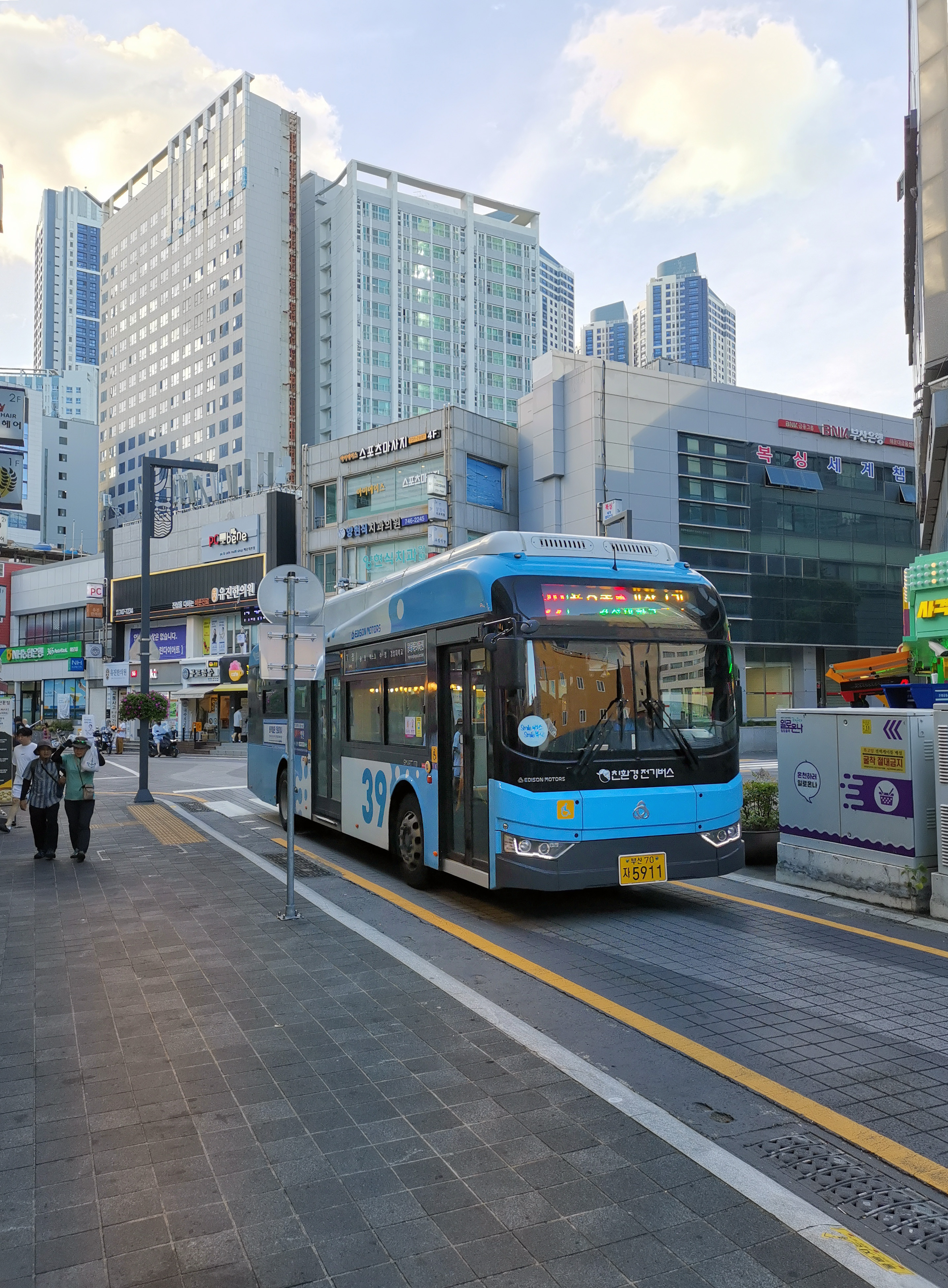
Electric city bus in Busan

Major express bus lines link Busan with other cities in Korea at two primary bus terminals, Nopodong Bus Terminal (at the northern terminus of Subway Line 1) and Busan Seobu Bus Terminal at Sasang Station on Subway Line 2. 134 routes of urban bus service reach every part of Busan.

==== City buses ====
City buses operate a total of 160 routes. There are express buses connecting major areas quickly through tunnels and overpasses and general city buses which make stops at each bus stop. There are also airport buses connecting the Gimhae International Airport and the downtown area. Some of the city buses of Busan's adjacent cities including Yangsan, Changwon, Gimhae, and Ulsan also offer service to Busan.

==== Gimhae Airport Limousine Bus ====
Gimhae Airport Limousine Bus is one of the fastest buses connecting Gimhae International Airport and the downtown area. As of 2012, three routes are operated by Taeyoung Airport Limousine Corp.

- Nampo-dong: Gimhae International Airport ↔ Seomyeon, Busanjin Station, Busan Station, Nampo-dong ↔ Chungmu-dong (Seo-gu Office)

- Haeundae No.1: Gimhae International Airport ↔ Namcheon-dong, BEXCO, Dongbaekseom (Westin Chosun Busan), Haeundae ↔ New City (Jangsan Station)

- Haeundae No.2: Gimhae International Airport ↔ Namcheon-dong, Gwangan Bridge, Haeundae ↔ New Town (Jangsan Station) Express Bus

==== Intercity buses ====
Intercity buses to the east Gyeongnam, Gyeongbuk, Gangwon and Gyeonggi Provinces are available at the Busan Central Bus Terminal. Buses offering service to West Gyeongnam and Jeolla Province depart from the Busan West Bus Terminal located in Sasang. Buses to the east Gyeongnam area, including Ulsan, Gimhae, and Changwon, the Seoul Metropolitan Area, including Osan, Suwon, Ansan, Bucheon and Dong Seoul, and the southern Gangwon area, including Donghae and Gangneung, are available at the Haeundae Intercity Bus Terminal. The Dongnae Intercity Bus Terminal has buses to the central and southern Gyeongnam area, including Changwon, Gimhae, Gosung, Tongyoung, and Geoje, as well as to Suncheon, Yeosu and Gwangyang.

=== Sea ===
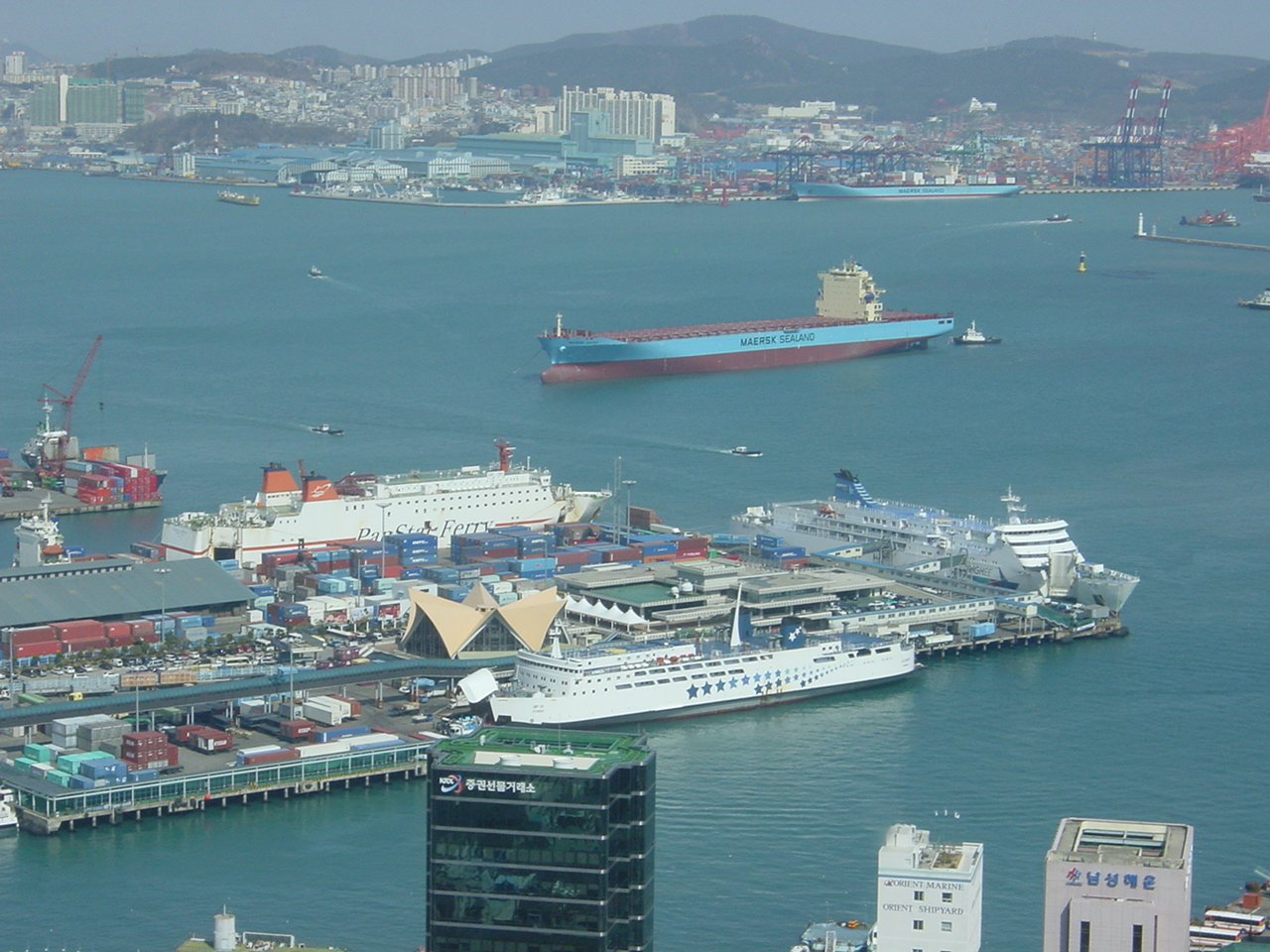
Busan Port Pier 1 with the International Ferry Terminal (3 docked ferries shown)

Ferries leaving from the International Ferry Terminal at Busan Port Pier 3,4 connect Busan to the Japanese ports of Izuhara and Hitakatsu on Tsushima Island, as well as the cities of Shimonoseki, Fukuoka, and Osaka on Japan's mainland.

- PanStar operates the PanStar Ferry between Busan and Osaka.
- The Seaflower 2, the ferry to Tsushima operated by Dae-a Express Shipping, carries passengers only between Busan and Hitakatsu in 1 hour 40 minutes and between Busan and Izuhara in 2 hours 40 minutes.
- The Seonghee, operated by Pukwan Ferry, links Busan to Shimonoseki.
- One of the ferries to Fukuoka is the Camellia, operated by the Camellia Line. The Camellia makes the trip to Fukuoka overnight in 7 hours 30 minutes, and a trip back in the afternoon in 5 hours 30 minutes.
- The other ferry service to Fukuoka is assumed by the Beetles and the Kobees, 2 fleets of high-speed hydrofoils operated by Miraejet. About five departures from each city are scheduled every day. By hydrofoil, it only takes 2 hours and 55 minutes to cross the Korea Strait to Fukuoka. The Beetles are owned by JR Kyushu.

=== Rail ===
Busan Station

Busan lies on a number of rail lines, of which the most important is the Gyeongbu Line which connects it to other major cities such as Seoul, Daejeon, and Daegu. All classes of trains run along the Gyeongbu Line, including the super high speed KTX trains which provide frequent services to Seoul in approximately 150 minutes. The Gyeongbu Line terminates at Busan Station. Other lines include the Donghae Nambu Line which connects Ulsan, Pohang and Gyeongju.

SRT was first launched in 2016 and runs along the Gyeongbu and Honam high-speed railways. SRT offers a new gateway connecting the Gangnam area of Seoul with major cities. It is directly connected to Subway Line 3 and the Bundang Line, enhancing accessibility to Subway Lines 2, 5, and 8, as well as the Shinbundang Line, and it is also located near the Dongbu Expressway which connects to other major highways.

=== Metro ===
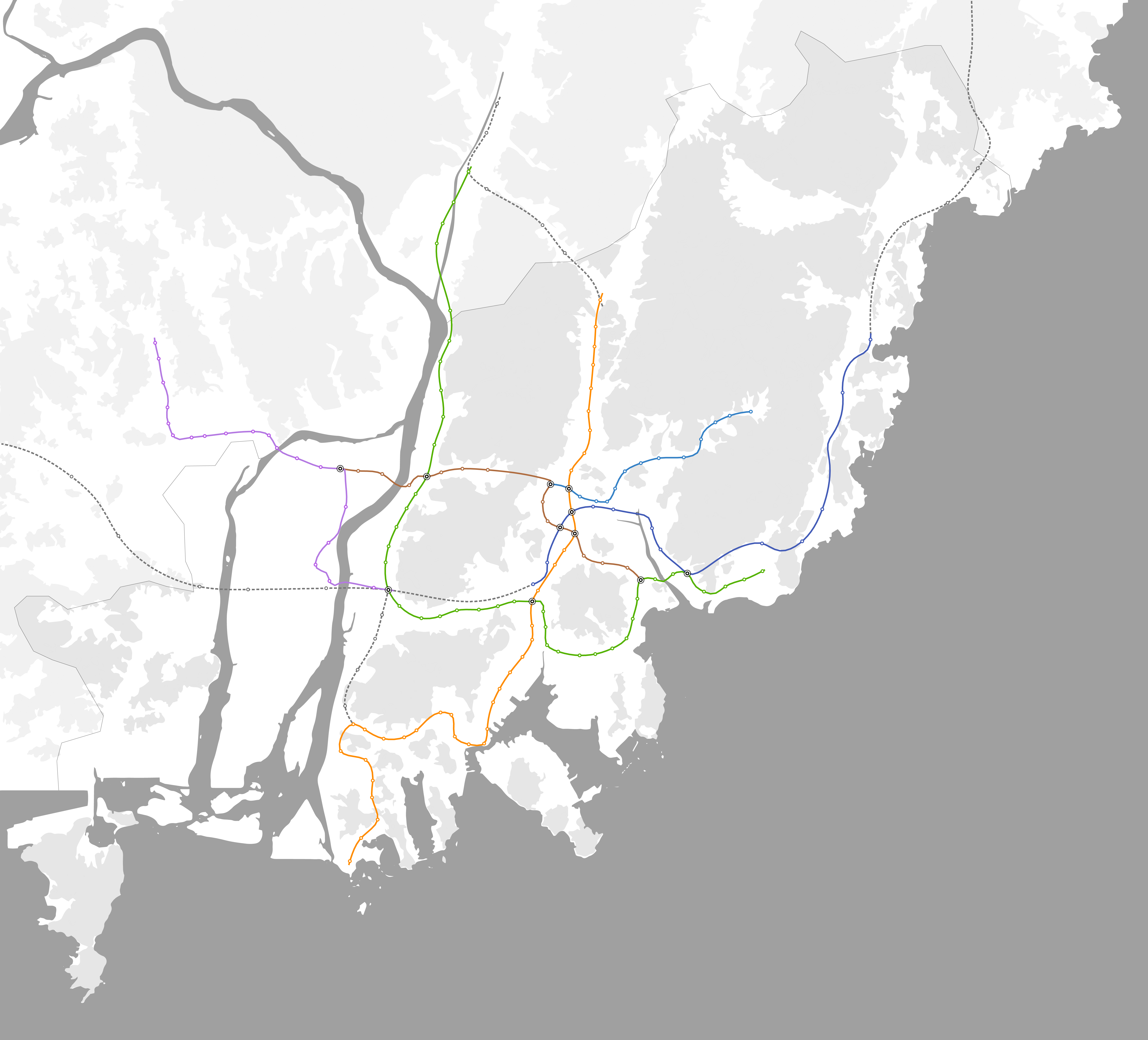
Geographically accurate map of Busan Metro

There are six subway lines as of January 2017. The transit stations are as follows: Seomyeon Station (Line 1, 2) / Yeonsan Station (Line 1, 3) / Suyeong Station (Lines 2, 3) / Deokcheon Station (Lines 2, 3) / Minam Station (Lines 3, 4) / Dongnae Station (Lines 1, 4) / Sasang Station (Line 2, Busan - Gimhae Light Rail Transit) / Daejeo Station (Line 3, Busan - Gimhae Light Rail Transit) / Busan National University of Education Station (Line 1, Donghae Line) / Bexco Station (Line 2, Donghae Line) / Geoje Station (Line 3, Donghae Line).

=== Air ===
Busan is served by Gimhae International Airport in Gangseo District. Gimhae International Airport is connected by Busan-Gimhae Light Rail Transit.

A new airport is being built on the southern end of Gadeokdo island to replace Gimhae International Airport, this will be the first airport constructed offshore in South Korea.

== International relations ==
=== Sister cities ===
Busan shares the title of sister city with several coastal cities or provinces around the world.

- Kaohsiung, Taiwan (1966)
- (United States) Los Angeles, US (1967)
- Shimonoseki, Japan (1976)
- Barcelona, Spain (1983)
- Rio de Janeiro, Brazil (1985)
- Vladivostok, Russia (1992)
- Shanghai, China (1993)
- Surabaya, Indonesia (1994)
- State of Victoria, Australia (1994)
- Ho Chi Minh City, Vietnam (1995)
- Tijuana, Mexico (1995)
- Auckland, New Zealand (1996)
- Valparaíso, Chile (1999)
- Montreal, Canada (2000)
- Western Cape, South Africa (2000)
- Istanbul, Turkey (2002)
- (United Arab Emirates) Dubai, UAE (2006)
- Fukuoka, Japan (2007)
- (United States) Chicago, US (2007)
- Saint Petersburg, Russia (2008)
- Phnom Penh, Cambodia (2009)
- Mumbai, India (2009)
- Thessaloniki, Greece (2010)
- Casablanca, Morocco (2011)
- Cebu Province, Philippines (2011)
- Yangon, Myanmar (2013)
- Gdynia, Poland (2020)

=== Friendship cities ===
Busan has 11 friendship cities in six countries.

- Shenzhen, China (2007)
- Tianjin, China (2007)
- Osaka, Japan (2008)
- Chongqing, China (2010)
- Bangkok, Thailand (2011)
- Beijing, China (2013)
- Nagasaki, Japan (2014)
- Bandar Abbas, Iran (2016)
- Ulaanbaatar, Mongolia (2016)
- Panama City, Panama (2016)
- Guangzhou, China (2019)

=== Sister ports ===
The Port of Busan also has 6 sister ports (listed in order of dates).

- (United Kingdom) – Port of Southampton, UK (1978)
- (United States) – Port of Miami, US (1981)
- – Port of Osaka, Japan (1985)
- – Port of Rotterdam, Netherlands (1985)
- (United States) – Port of New York & New Jersey, US (1988)
- – Port of Shanghai, China (1994)

== Notable people ==
- Ahn Bohyun (born 1988), actor
- Ahn Jaehong (born 1986), actor
- Ahn Jaemo (born 1979), singer and actor
- ALL'N, singer and violinist
- Bae Woohee (born 1991), singer, actress, and former member of Dal Shabet and Uni.T
- Baek Seunghyeon (born 1975), actor
- Cho Jinwoong (born 1976), actor
- Cho Won-woo (born 1994), windsurfer
- Heamin Choi (born 1984), racing driver
- Choi Jin-ri / Sulli (born 1994, died 2019), singer, actress, and former member of F(x)
- Choi Jiwoo (born 1975), actress
- Choi Kwonsoo (born 2004), actor
- Choi Min-gi / Ren (born 1995), singer, songwriter, actor, and former member of NU'EST
- Choi Ye-won / Arin (born 1999), singer, actress, and member of Oh My Girl
- Chu Sojung / Exy (born 1995), rapper, singer, songwriter, actress and member of WJSN
- Chun Hojin (born 1960), actor
- Samantha Futerman (born 1987), South Korean-born American actress, writer, director, and activist.
- Gang Dongwon (born 1981), actor
- Gong Yoo (born in 1979), actor
- Ha Yeonsoo (born 1990), actress
- Han Seung-woo (born 1994), singer-songwriter, rapper, dancer, actor, member of Victon and former member of X1
- Han Sun-hwa (born 1990), singer, actress, and former member of Secret
- Heo Sungtae (born 1977), actor
- Hwang Min-hyun (born 1995), singer, songwriter, actor, and former member of Wanna One and NU'EST
- Jang Hyejin (born 1975), actress
- Jang Hyuk (born 1976), actor, rapper
- Jang Wooyoung (born 1989), singer, songwriter, dancer, actor, and member of 2PM
- Jeon Jungkook (born 1997), singer, producer, songwriter, dancer, and member of BTS
- Jo Yuri (born 2001), singer, actress, and former member of Iz*One
- Joo Hee-jung (born 1977), basketball coach, and retired basketball player
- Jung Dae-hyun (born 1993), singer, songwriter, actor, and former member of B.A.P
- Jung Eunchae (born 1986), model, actress, and singer
- Jung Eun-ji (born 1993), singer, songwriter, actress, and member of Apink
- Grace Jung (born 1987), Korean American stand-up comedian, actor, writer, and filmmaker
- Kang Daniel (born in 1996), singer, a former member of Wanna One
- Kang Haneul (born 1990), actor
- Kang Hyung-ho (born 1988) rock, tenor~countertenor range and singer, currently member group of Forestella.
- Kang Mal-geum (born 1979), actress
- Kang Seungyoon (born 1994), singer-songwriter, actor, composer, and member of WINNER
- Daniel Dae Kim (born 1968), Korean-American actor
- Kim Dongjun (born 1992), singer, actor, and former member of ZE:A
- Kim Hae-sook (born 1955), actress
- Kim Hee-jin (born in 1991), South Korea women's national volleyball team
- Kim Jisoo (born 1993), actor and model
- Kim Junghyun (born 1990), actor
- Kim Minjeong / Winter (born in 2001), singer and member of Aespa and Got the Beat
- Kim Seulgi (born 1991), actress and comedian
- Kim Seyong (born 1991), singer, rapper, actor, and former member of Myname
- Kim Suk (born 1975), comedian
- Kim Taehee (born 1980), actress and model
- Kim Wonhae (born 1969), actor and comedian
- Kwon Mina (born 1993), singer, actress, and former member of AOA and AOA Black
- Eunji Lee, pastry chef
- Lee Jang-kun (born 1992), professional Kabaddi player
- Lee Jihoon / Woozi (born 1996), singer, dancer, producer, songwriter, and member of Seventeen
- Lee Jonghyun (born 1990), singer, guitarist, songwriter, actor, and former member of CNBLUE
- Lee Joongi (born 1982), actor, singer, writer, dancer, and model
- Lee Junghwan / Sandeul (born 1992), singer, actor, and member of B1A4
- Lee Seunghoon / Hoony (born 1992), rapper, dancer, choreographer, and member of WINNER
- Lee Suji / Halla (born 1998), singer, actress, and former member of The Ark and UNI.T
- Lee Hodong / Lee Howon / Hoya (born 1991), singer, rapper, songwriter, dancer, actor, former member of Infinite
- Nam Joohyuk (born 1994), actor and model
- Park Gyeongree / Kyungri (born 1990), singer, actress, and member of Nine Muses
- Park Hae-jin (born 1983), actor and model
- Park Hae-joon (born 1976), actor
- Park Ji-hoon (born 2000), leader, vocalist, dancer, member of Treasure
- Park Ji-il (born 1960), film actor, theater actor
- Park Jimin (born 1995), singer, songwriter, dancer, and member of BTS
- Park Jiwon (born 1998), singer and member of fromis_9
- Park Jong-cheol, South Korean democratization activist
- Sandara Park (born 1984), singer, actress, and former member of 2NE1
- Park Sanghyun / Thunder (born 1990), singer-songwriter, actor, model, and former member of MBLAQ
- Park Sooah / Lizzy (born 1992), singer, actress, and member of After School and Orange Caramel
- Park Sunyoung / Hyomin (born 1989), singer, songwriter, actress, fashion designer, and member of T-ara
- Park Woo-jin (born 1999), rapper, singer, dancer, songwriter, a former member of Wanna One, member of AB6IX
- Ryu "Keria" Min-seok (born 2002), professional League of Legends player, support for T1
- Jessica Seobyn Ryu (born 2000), beauty queen; Miss Korea 2024
- Seo Yuna (born 1992), singer, songwriter, actress, producer, yoga instructor and former member of AOA
- Shin Bong-sun (born 1980), comedian
- Son Dongwoon (born 1991), singer, songwriter, actor, and member of Highlight
- Song kang-ho (born 1967), actor
- Song Seunghyun (born 1992), singer, guitarist, songwriter, actor, and former member of F.T. Island
- Yang Hyo-jin (born in 1989), volleyball player
- Yang Jeong-in / I.N (born 2001), vocalist, member of Stray Kids
- Yim Si-wan (born 1988), singer, actor, and former member of ZE:A
- Yoo Jaemyung (born 1973), actor
- Yoo Kang-min (born 2003), singer, member of VERIVERY

== See also ==
- 40–step stairway
- Busan–Geoje Fixed Link
- Gwangan Bridge
- List of cities in South Korea
- List of East Asian ports
- Pusan Newport International Terminal
