= Marine City, Busan =

Residential area in Busan, South Korea

Coordinates: 35°09′24.09″N 129°08′41.99″E

Marine City 마린시티
- Residential area
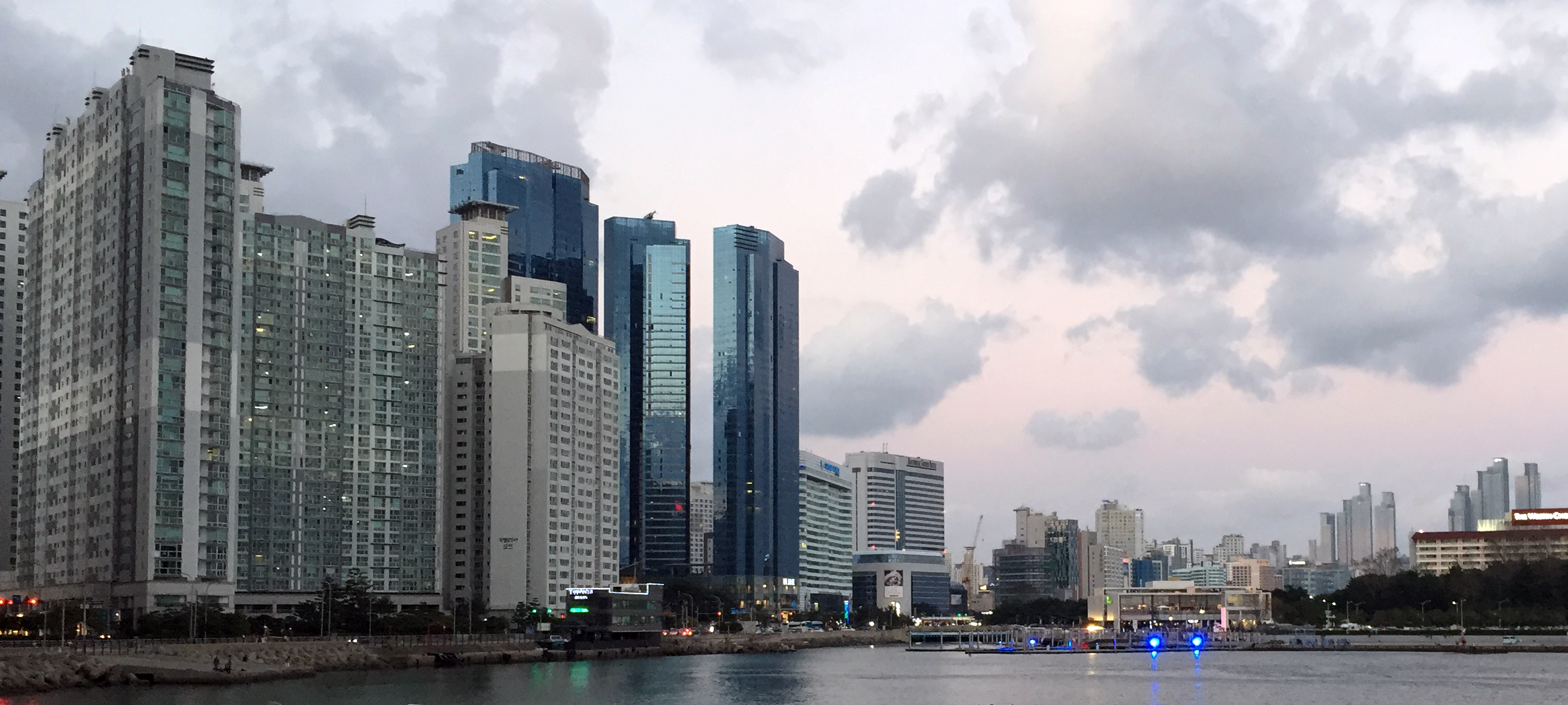
- Western edge of Marine City (Left)
- Interactive map of Marine City
- Country: South Korea
- City: Busan
- District: Haeundae District

Marine City (Korean: 마린시티) is a residential area in Haeundae District, Busan, South Korea. Most of the buildings are very luxurious skyscrapers. Marine City is built on reclaimed land between the popular areas of Haeundae Beach and Centum City. The tallest residential complexes in Marine City include Haeundae Doosan We've the Zenith, Haeundae I'Park Marina, Daewoo Aratrium Haeundae and Park Hyatt Busan. The Haeundae ramp of the Donghae Expressway travels through Marine City. Legoland Korea Resort has a model of Marine City in a Miniland park.

== History ==
On October 1, 2010, the Wooshin Golden Suites fire occurred in Marine City. It was caused by a spark from an electrical outlet and resulted in five people being injured.

The 2018 film Black Panther had a few filming locations in Marine City and at the Gwangandaegyo Bridge.

== See also ==
- Busan
- Haeundae District
