= Jangsan =

Jangsan may refer to:

- Jangsan (Busan), a mountain in the South Korean city of Busan
- Jangsan (Gangwon), a mountain in the South Korean province of Gangwon-do
- Jangsan station, a railway station in the South Korean city of Busan
