= Haeundae Market =

Traditional market in Busan, South Korea

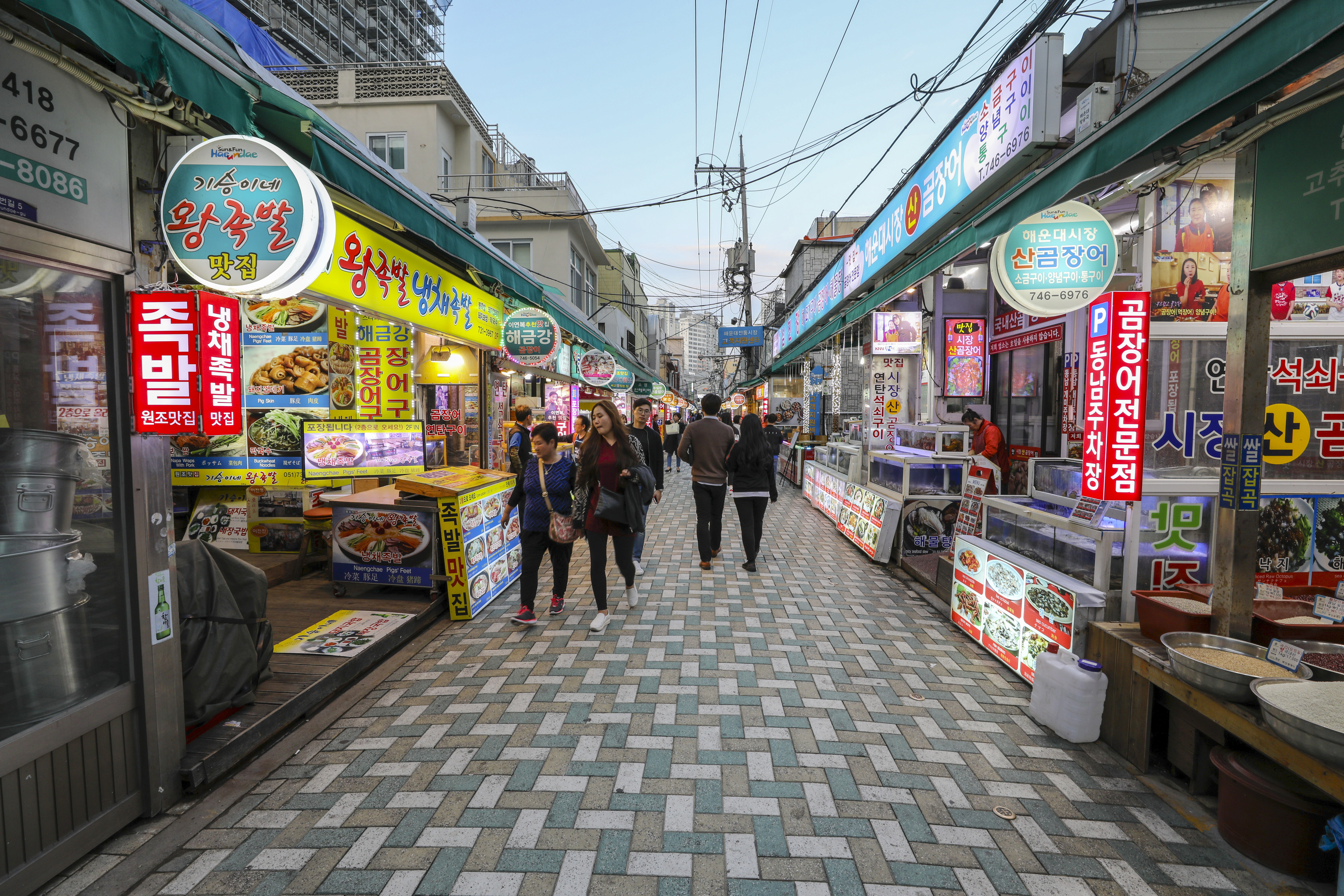
- The main market street (2018)
- Coordinates: 35.1614°N 129.1623°E
- Address: 22-1, Gunam-ro 41beon-gil, Haeundae District, Busan, South Korea
- Opened: 1910
- Floor area: 9,355 m^{2} (100,700 ft^{2})

Haeundae Market (Korean: 해운대시장; Hanja: 海雲臺市場), also called Haeundae Traditional Market, is a traditional market in Haeundae District, Busan, South Korea. The market formed organically. It was open by 1910. It received official recognition status on May 7, 2005. It was renovated in August 2008.

It has a total area of 9,355 m^{2} (100,700 ft^{2}), and around 156 businesses total. There are a variety of street food stalls, fresh produce and seafood sellers, and restaurants in the market. Many of the merchants are members of an association that manages the marketplace. The market is reportedly a major source of tourism for the area; people who visited the market often visit restaurants nearby it.

The market is nearby other tourist attractions, including Dongbaekseom and Dalmaji Road.

== Gallery ==
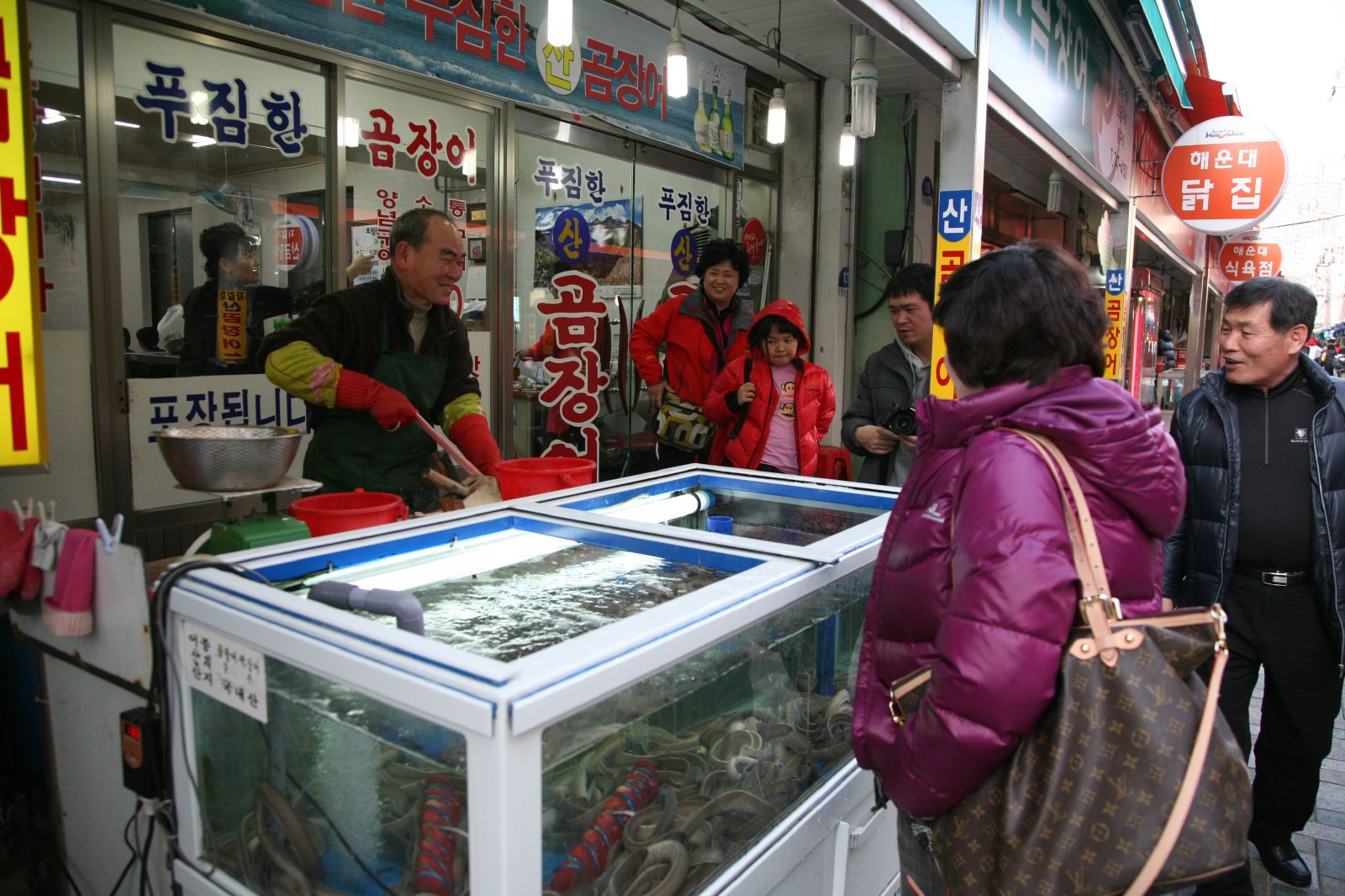
A merchant preparing hagfish for sale (2009)

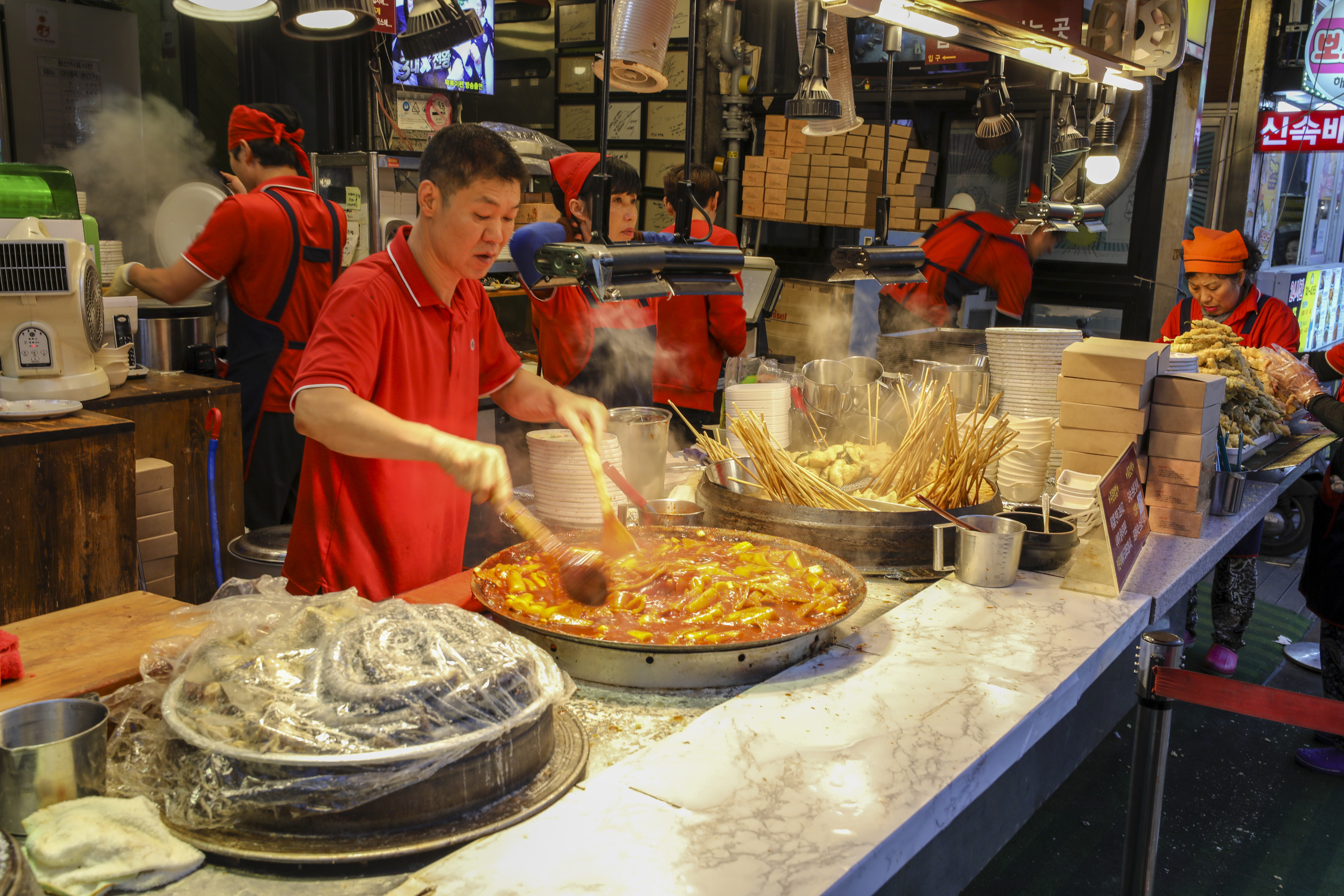
A man selling (in order from left to right) sundae, tteokbokki, and fishcakes in the market (2018)

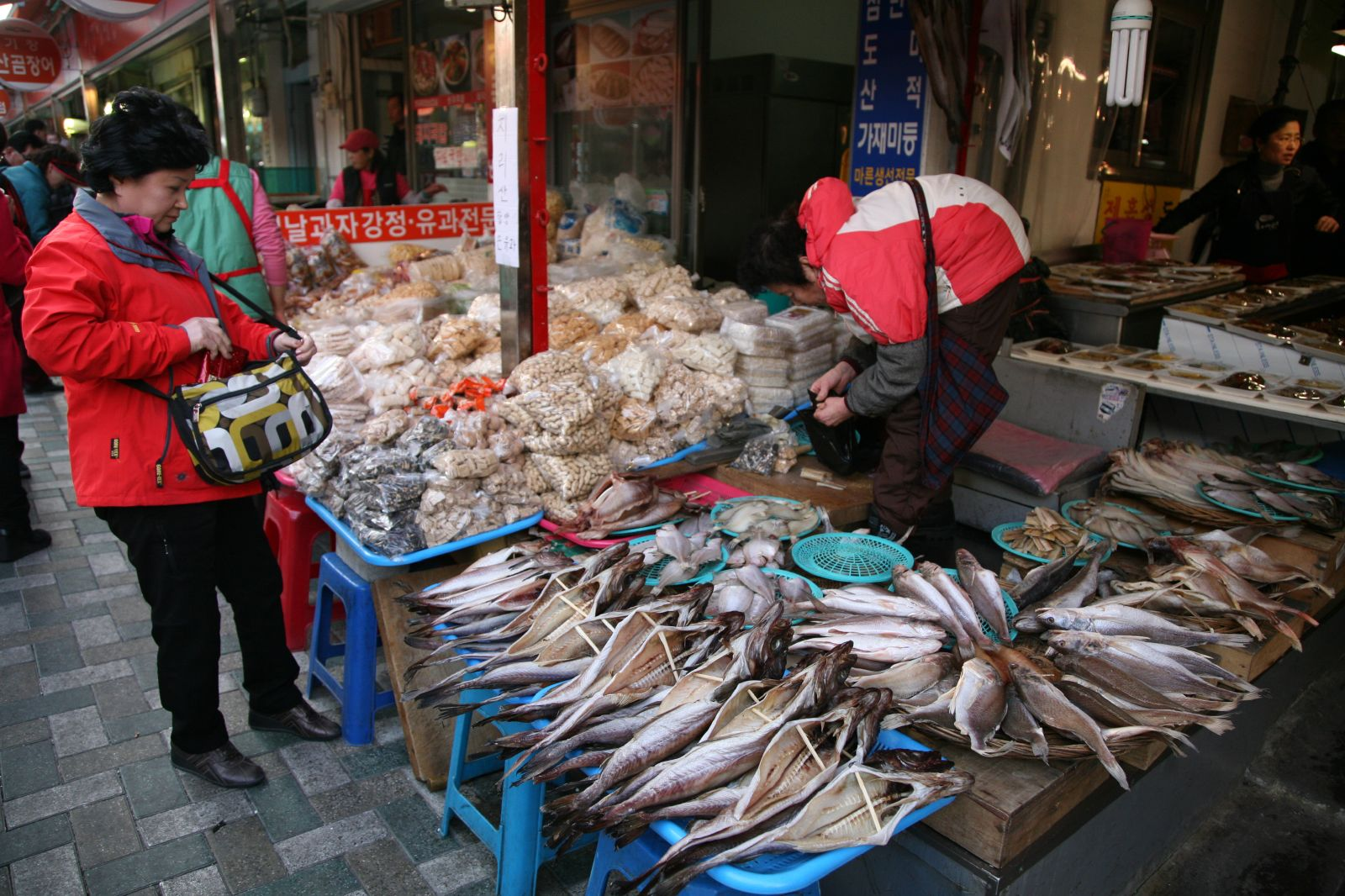
A merchant selling dried fish (2009)
