= Legoland Korea Resort =

Lego themed resort in South Korea

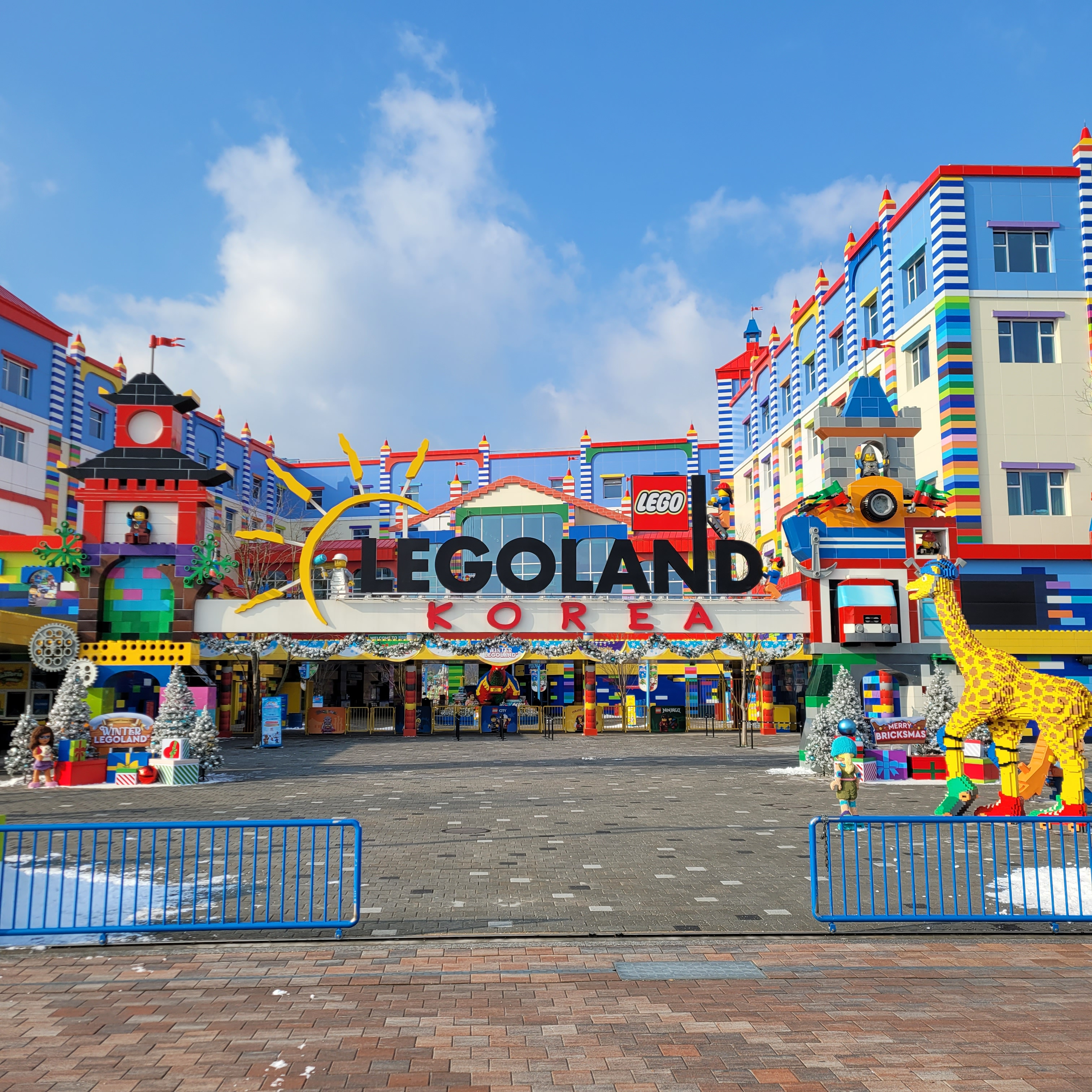
- Entrance
- Interactive map of Legoland Korea Resort
- Location: Jungdo Island, Chuncheon, Gangwon Province
- Coordinates: 37°53′02″N 127°41′49″E
- Status: Operating
- Opened: May 5, 2022; 4 years ago (Note: A soft opening occurred earlier on April 2, 2022.)
- Owner: Merlin Entertainments
- Operated by: Merlin Entertainments
- Theme: Lego
- Area: 70 acres (280,000 m^{2})

Attractions
- Total: Over 40
- Roller coasters: 1
- Water rides: 3
- Website: https://www.legoland.kr/

Legoland Korea (Korean: 레고랜드 코리아) is a theme park in Chuncheon, Gangwon Province, South Korea. It opened on May 5, 2022. Legoland Korea Resort covers 280,000 square meters (3.01 million square feet), making it the 2nd largest in Asia behind Legoland Malaysia Resort which covers 76 acres of land.

== History ==
Gangwon Province and Merlin Entertainment Group signed an MOA on the Legoland Korea Resort Development Project on September 1, 2011. A representative of Gangwon Province noted, "Legoland Korea, if opening, will attract two million tourists annually, create 9,800 jobs and boost local tax revenue by 4.4 billion won." The theme park officially opened on May 5, 2022.

== Park locations ==
=== Miniland ===
City/Region	Image	Description
Seoul		Featuring models of Gyeongbokgung, Blue House, Seoul City Hall, N Seoul Tower, Namsan cable car, Gwanghwamun Plaza, 63 Building, Lotte World Tower, Jongno Tower, Namdaemun, Dongdaemun and National Assembly (South Korea)
Busan		Featuring models of Marine City, Haeundae Beach, Sajik Baseball Stadium, Port of Busan, Yeongdo Bridge, Jagalchi Market and Haedong Yonggungsa
Gangwon Province		Featuring models of Alpensia Ski Jumping Stadium, Naksansa and Jeongdongjin
Gyeongju		Featuring models of Bulguksa, Anapji, Seokguram, Cheomseongdae and Bunhwangsa
North Chungcheong Province		Featuring models of Guinsa
Jeju Province		Featuring a model of Seongsan Ilchulbong and Cheonjiyeon Waterfall

== Rides and attractions ==
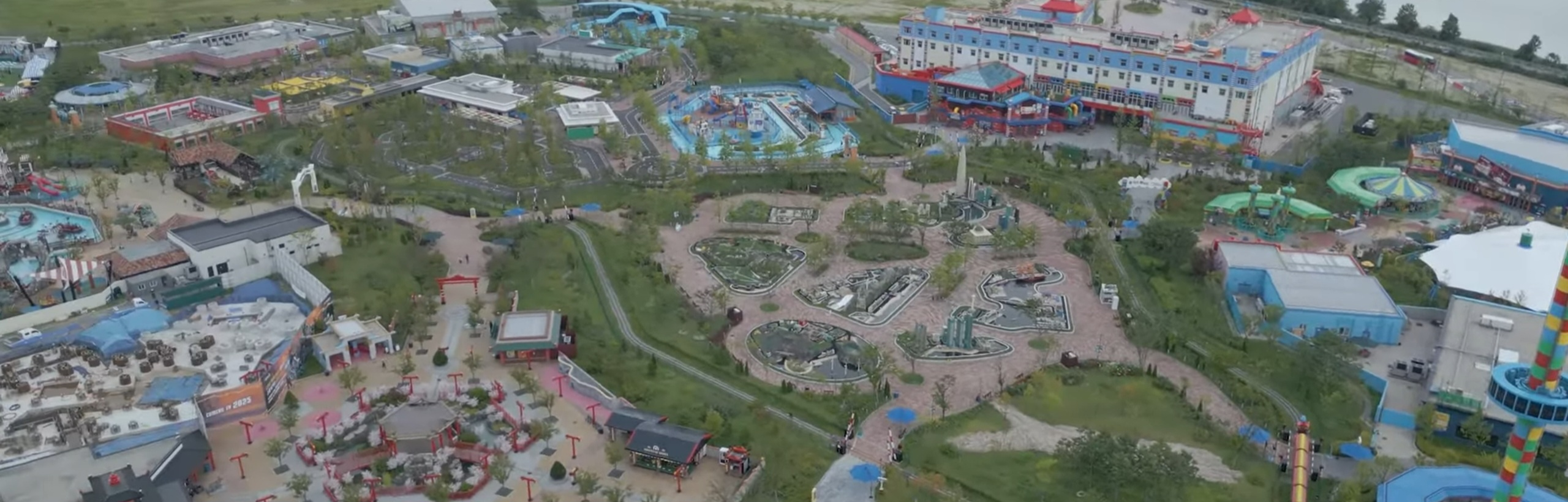
A panoramic view of the resort

=== Bricktopia ===
Attraction	Opened	Description
Monkey Climb	2022	Drop tower with a motor and gear, but with the occupants pulling up the rope
Brick Party	2022	Carousel
LEGO NINJAGO Live	2022	4D Experience Puppet Show
Creative Jungle	2022	
DUPLO Express	2022	
DJ's Dizzy Disco Spin	2022	
LEGO Creative Workshop	2022	
Robotic Play Centre	2022	
Build & Test	2022	
LEGOLAND Lookout	2022	

=== Brick Street ===
Attraction	Opened	Description
LEGO Factory Adventure Ride	2022	Trackless Dark ride Tours Lego Factory

=== LEGO Castle ===
Attraction	Opened	Description
Merlin's Challenge	2022	
Builder's Guild	2022	
Merlin's Flying Machines	2022	Flying Machine Ride
The Royal Joust	2022	
The Dragon	2022	Legoland Korea's only thrill ride: the track is 526 m long. In the beginning, it travels through the castle like a dark ride.
DUPLO Play – Royal Stables	2022	

=== LEGO City ===
Attraction	Opened	Description
Coast guard Academy	2022	
Driving School	2022	
Junior Driving School	2022	
Wave Racers	2022	
Palace 4D Cinema	2022	
LEGOLAND Express	2022	Train attraction to tour the entire Legoland Korea Resort Park
LEGO CITY Airport	2022	
Fire Academy	2022	Attraction to drive a fire truck to the scene of a fire to extinguish a hypothetical fire
The Wharf	2022	

LEGO NINJAGO World

Attraction	Opened	Description
LEGO NINJAGO The Ride	2022	Attraction that take place every certain time by boarding the Ninja Ride and travel along a set route to defeat the enemy
Kai's Fire Spinners	2022	
DUPLO Play – Ninjago Dojo	2022	
Cole's Rock Climbing	2022	One-meter-long rock-climbing
Jay's Lightning Drill	2022	Whac-A-Mole
NINJAGO: Masters of Spinjitzu coaster	2026	Cost ₩20,000,000,000 2 trains with 4 cars per train. Riders are arranged 2 across in 2 rows for a total of 16 riders per train.

=== Pirate Shores ===
Attraction	Opened	Description
Splash Battle	2022	
Anchors Away	2022	
Treasure Hunt	2022	Attraction to find treasure with holograms for a limited time
Castaway Camp	2022	
DUPLO Play – Swabbies Deck	2022	

== Legoland Hotel ==
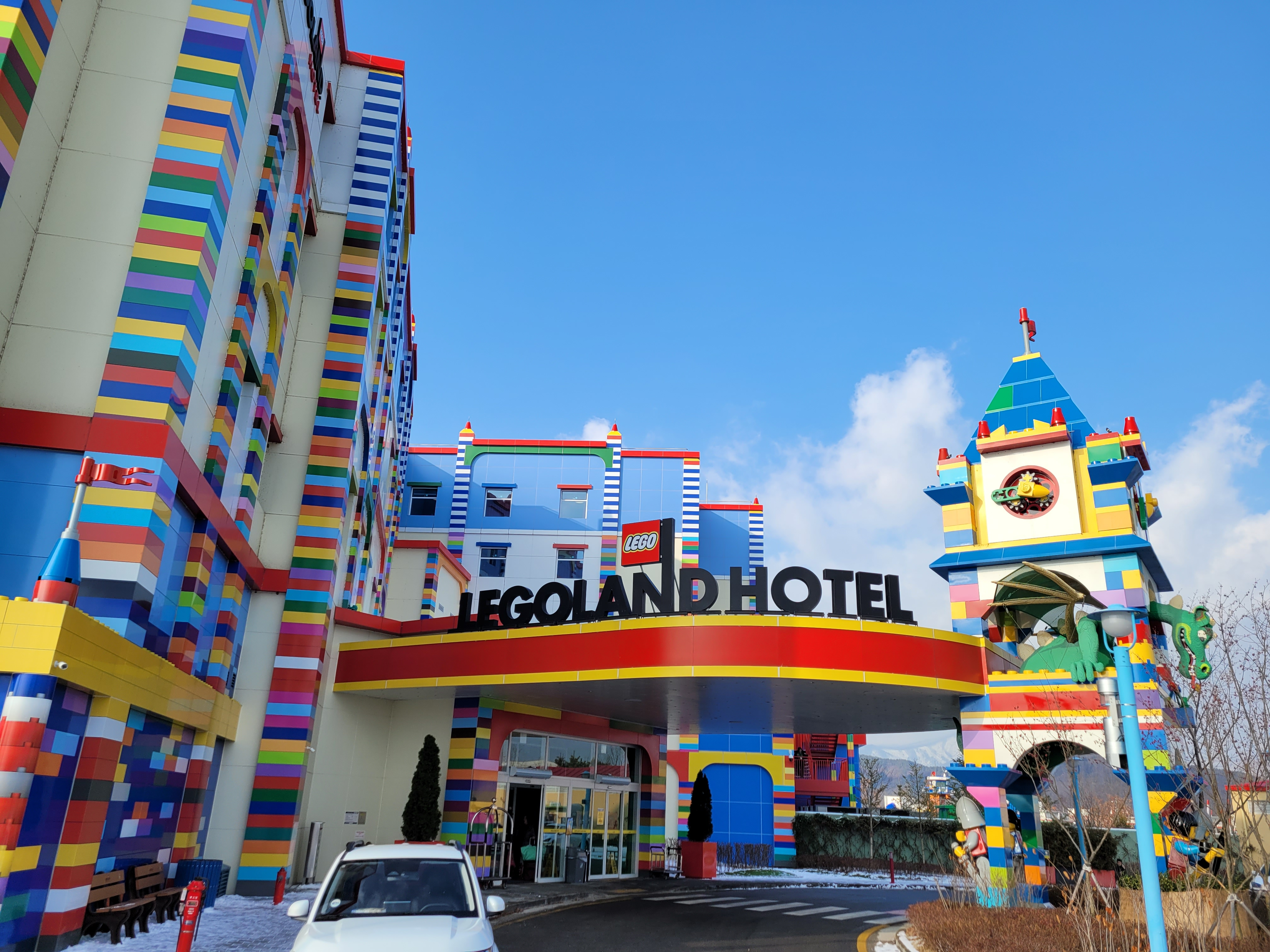
Legoland Korea Hotel

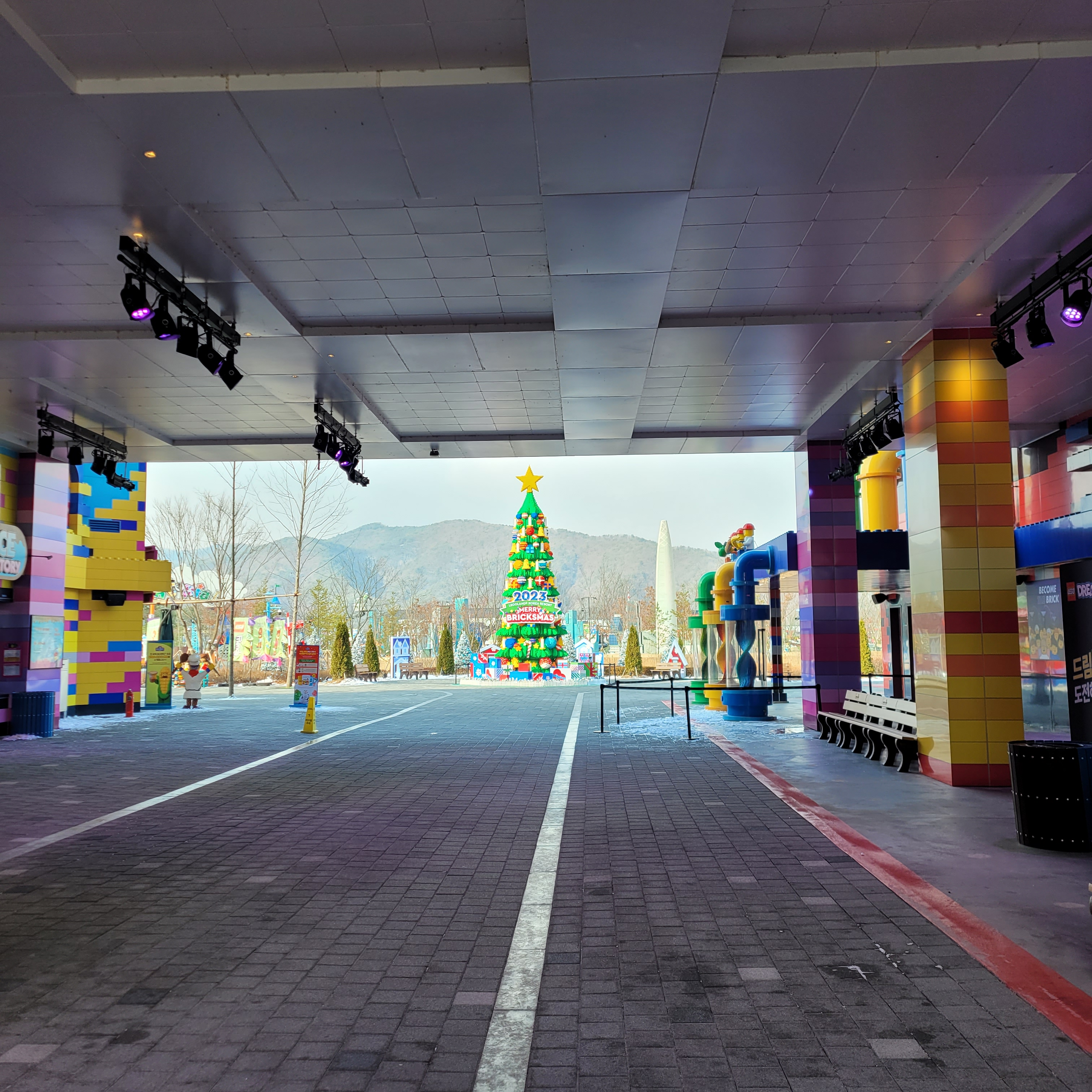
Inside of Legoland Korea

The Legoland Hotel is open 24 hours a day.

== Criticism and issues ==
Legoland Korea has been marred by debt and financial issues. It has also been criticized for its high admission and parking fees for a relatively small park. Since its opening, the actual number of visitors has been significantly lower than the projected two million. Furthermore, there has been additional criticism in regards to the park location on Jungdo Island, which was built over an ancient archaeological site, causing permanent damage. The island was home to a massive site of rare relics going back 5,000 years.
