= Haeundae District =

District of Busan, South Korea

Coordinates: 35°09′43″N 129°09′50″E

Haeundae
- Autonomous District
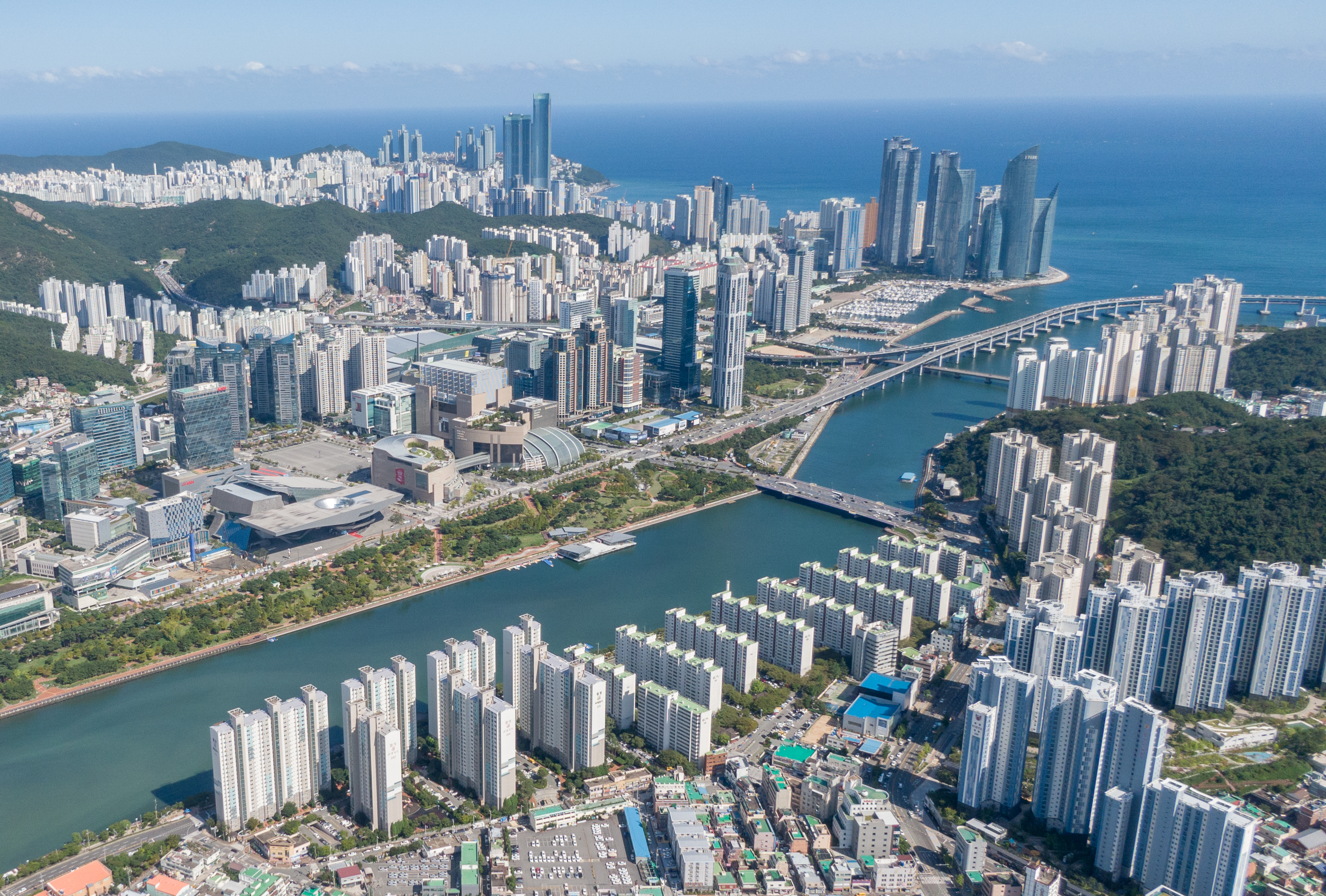
- Skyline of Haeundae

- Flag

- Country: South Korea
- Region: Yeongnam
- Provincial level: Busan
- Administrative divisions: 18 administrative dong

Government
  - Mayor: Kim Seong-su (김성수)

Area
  - Total: 51.5 km^{2} (19.9 sq mi)

Population (2024)
  - Total: 376,621
  - Density: 8,226/km^{2} (21,310/sq mi)
  - Dialect: Gyeongsang
- Website: Haeundae District Office

Korean name
- Hangul: 해운대구
- Hanja: 海雲臺區
- RR: Haeundae-gu
- MR: Haeundae-gu

Haeundae District (Korean: 해운대구) is a district (gu) of Busan, South Korea.

Haeundae has a population of about 423,000, the most populous district of Busan with 11.6% of the city population, and covers an area of 51.44 km^{2} (19.86 sq mi) in eastern Busan. Haeundae became a division of Busan Metropolitan City in 1976 and attained the status of district in 1980.

Haeundae is linked to Busan Subway Line 2 and train stations on the Donghae Nambu railway line.

== History ==
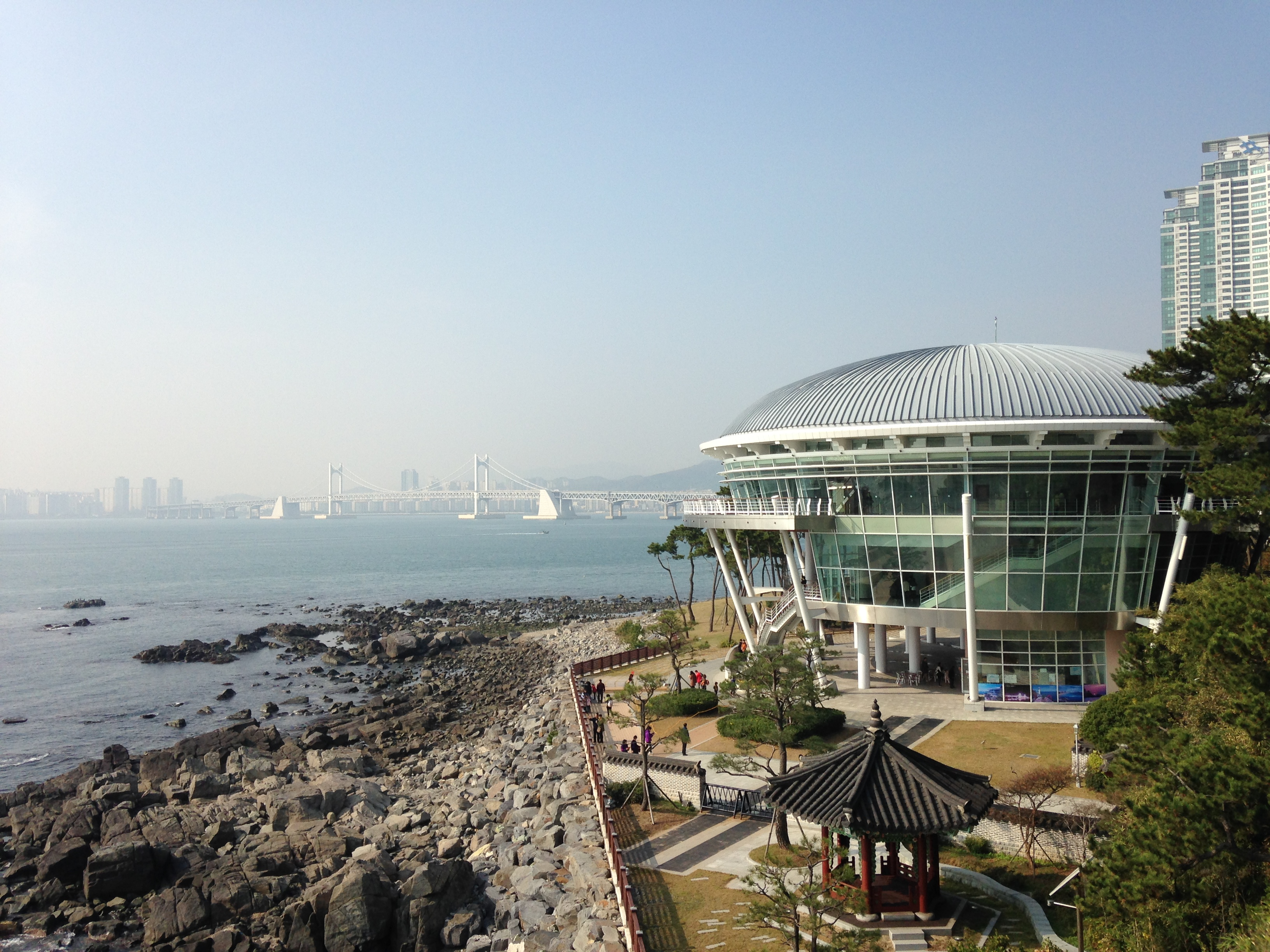
APEC House and Gwang-an Bridge

Haeundae takes its name from the ninth century Silla scholar and poet Ch'oe Ch'i-wŏn (literary name Haeun, or "Sea and Clouds"), who, according to a historical account, admired the view from the beach and built a pavilion nearby. A piece of Ch'oe's calligraphy, which he engraved on a rock at Haeundae, still exists. On Haeundae Dongbaek Island, there is a statue of Ch'oe Ch'i-wŏn, a Confucian scholar of the Unified Silla Period, and a monument. During the reign of Queen Jinseong during the Unified Silla Period, Ch'oe Ch'i-wŏn lamented that there was no place to write his studies.

Haeundae used to be isolated from the large communities in Busan and Busanjin. It remained undeveloped until the late 1970s and early 1980s. A small number of luxury hotels were constructed after the 1988 Seoul Olympics. More hotels and other tourist facilities have been constructed on the beach-front area since the mid-1990s, and shopping malls and movie theatre complexes have been built in the 'centre' of Haeundae: an area between Haeundae Station and the beach. The area has continued to grow, apart from during the 1997 Asian financial crisis.

Haeundae has been a regular host of the annual Busan International Film Festival (BIFF). Haeundae's Dongbaek Island was the location for the 2005 APEC Conference.

Haeundae New Town (해운대 신시가지, 海雲臺 新市街地, Haeundae Sinsigaji), a major commercial and residential redevelopment project begun in 1990, is located in the Jwa-dong area. This area lies in the southern shadow of the mountain Jangsan to the north, and is bounded in the south by Haeundae Station on the Dalmaji Gogae line of the Korean National Railroad. Another development project, Centum City, has been ongoing since early 2000 and is now a major feature of Busan. Marine City, located nearby, is constructed on land reclaimed from the sea, and has several huge, high-rise apartment blocks. Additional apartment blocks are under construction, with water resorts and related facilities, for use by the public, also planned for Marine City.

== Tourist attractions ==
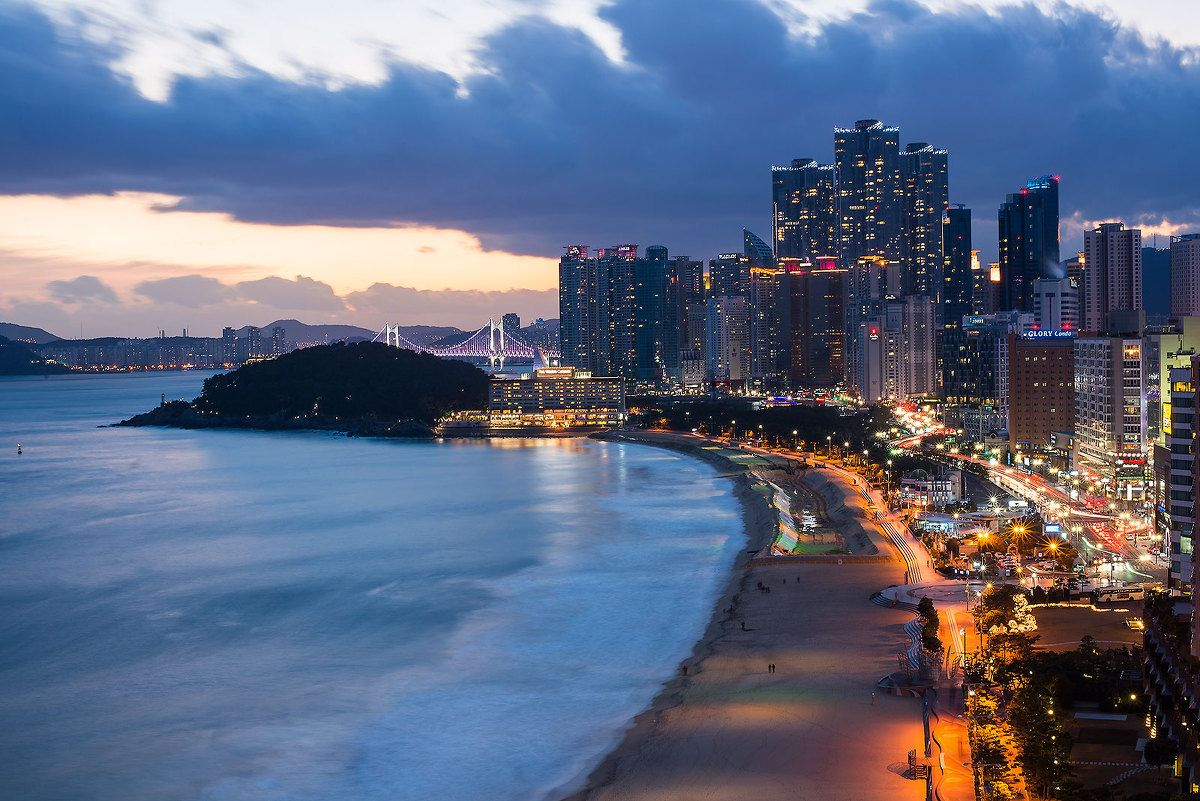
Haeundae Beach

The district contains Haeundae Traditional Market, a large marketplace founded in 1910. It also contains Cheongsapo Daritdol Observatory, an elevated walkway over the sea, where people can look down into the reefs, see the coast, and look to the sunset over the ocean. The oldest active restaurant in Haeundae District is the Chinese restaurant Sinheunggwan.

=== Haeundae Dalmaji Hill ===
Haeundae's Dalmaji Hill is touted as one of the eight attractions of Busan, and is noted for its scenic view of the moon. Ch'oe Ch'i-wŏn (857-10th century), an official and poet from the late Unified Silla Dynasty (668–935), was so struck by its beauty that he decided to extend his stay there. Some even say that Dalmaji Hill is Busan's answer to Montmartre.

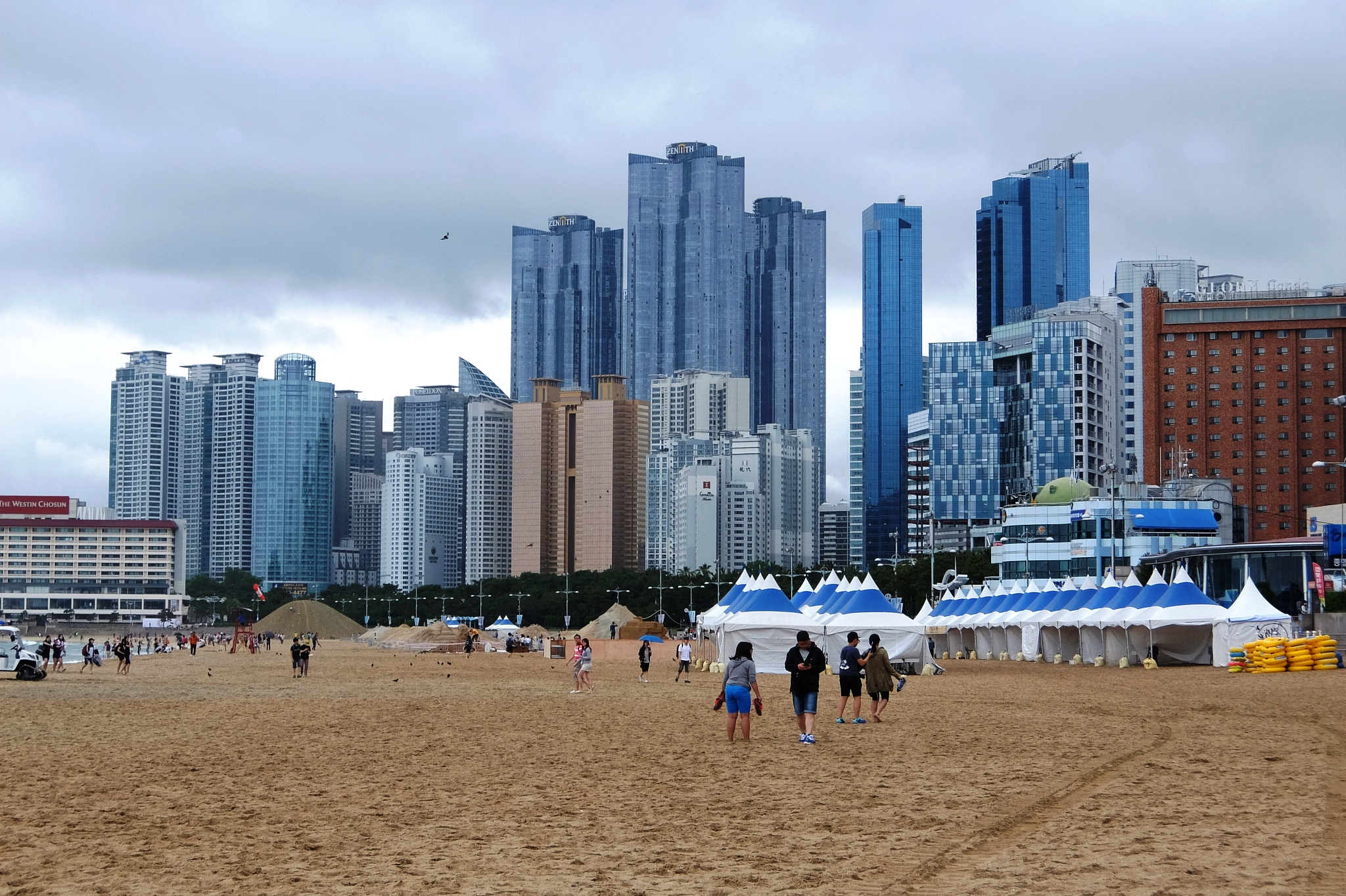
Marine City on a cloudy day

=== Haeundae Beach ===
Haeundae Beach is regarded as one of the most famous beaches in South Korea. Along with Gwangandaegyo Bridge, it is one of Busan's iconic landmarks, particularly famous among visitors from outside the city. Known as the largest beach in South Korea in terms of size and area.

Busan Cinema Center

=== Haeridan-gil Street ===
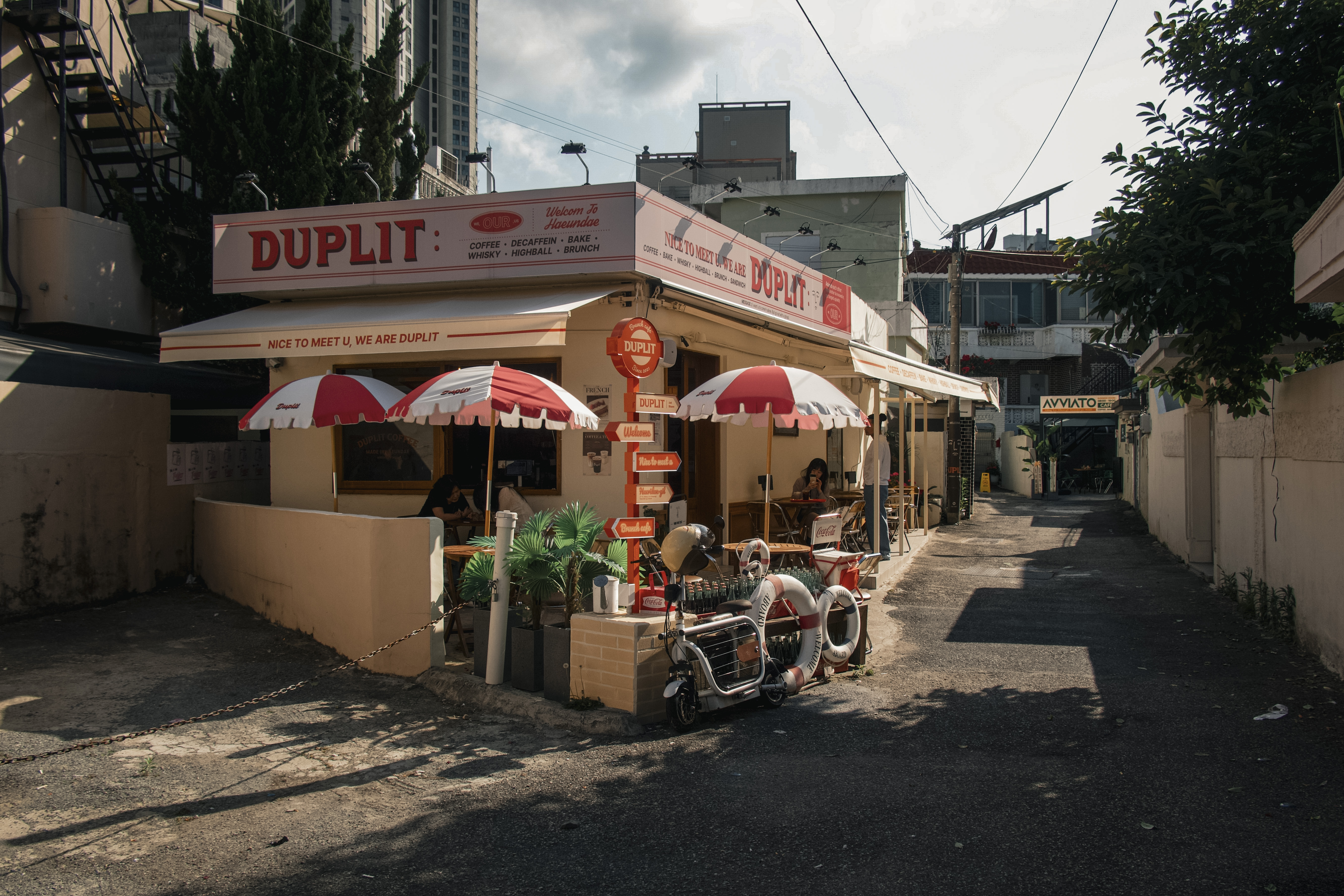
One of the many cafes in Haeridan-gil

Previously an old residential neighbourhood, Haeridan-gil (해리단길) has transformed in the last decade into a trendy area where many young locals spend their weekends. The neighbourhood is full of aesthetic cafes, highly rated restaurants and boutiques. Haeridan-gil is located at the top on gunam-ro, behind the old Haeundae Station, across the old Donghae-Nambu line (1905 to 2005).

=== Songjeong Beach ===
This beach is in Songjeong-dong, the westernmost division of Haeundae district. 1.2 km long, it is popular with families and surfers, with a wide beach of white sand and shallow waters. There is a park to the north, featuring a pavilion and viewpoint, beyond which lies an active fishing port with scenic lighthouses.

== Film and television ==
Haeundae is popular in South Korean media as a setting or filming location. The district was the setting of the movie Haeundae, a South Korean disaster movie scenario of an immense tsunami hitting the city of Busan. Haeundae has been featured in numerous K-Dramas, with the beach and Dongbaekseom being used as a filming location for Seoul Broadcasting System's 2008 drama Star's Lover. The island was the location for the scene where Lee Ma-ri, played by Choi Ji-woo confesses her love for Kim Chul Soo, played by Yoo Ji-tae; and the couple takes a walk on the beach. In 2012, KBS2 broadcast a drama, Haeundae Lovers, using Busan and the district as a backdrop. Much of the story takes place in Cheongsapo, a coastal community in the district east of Haeundae Beach.

Hauendae is home to the Busan Cinema Center, the location of the annual Busan International Film Festival, which features 5 inside theaters and 1 outside theater.

== Education ==
Haeundae Tourism High School is a private vocational school in the district that specializes in tourism. Founded in 1972, it has a golf course, as well as facilities for the teaching of cooking, baking, bartending, and casino work.

== Administrative divisions ==
Administrative divisions

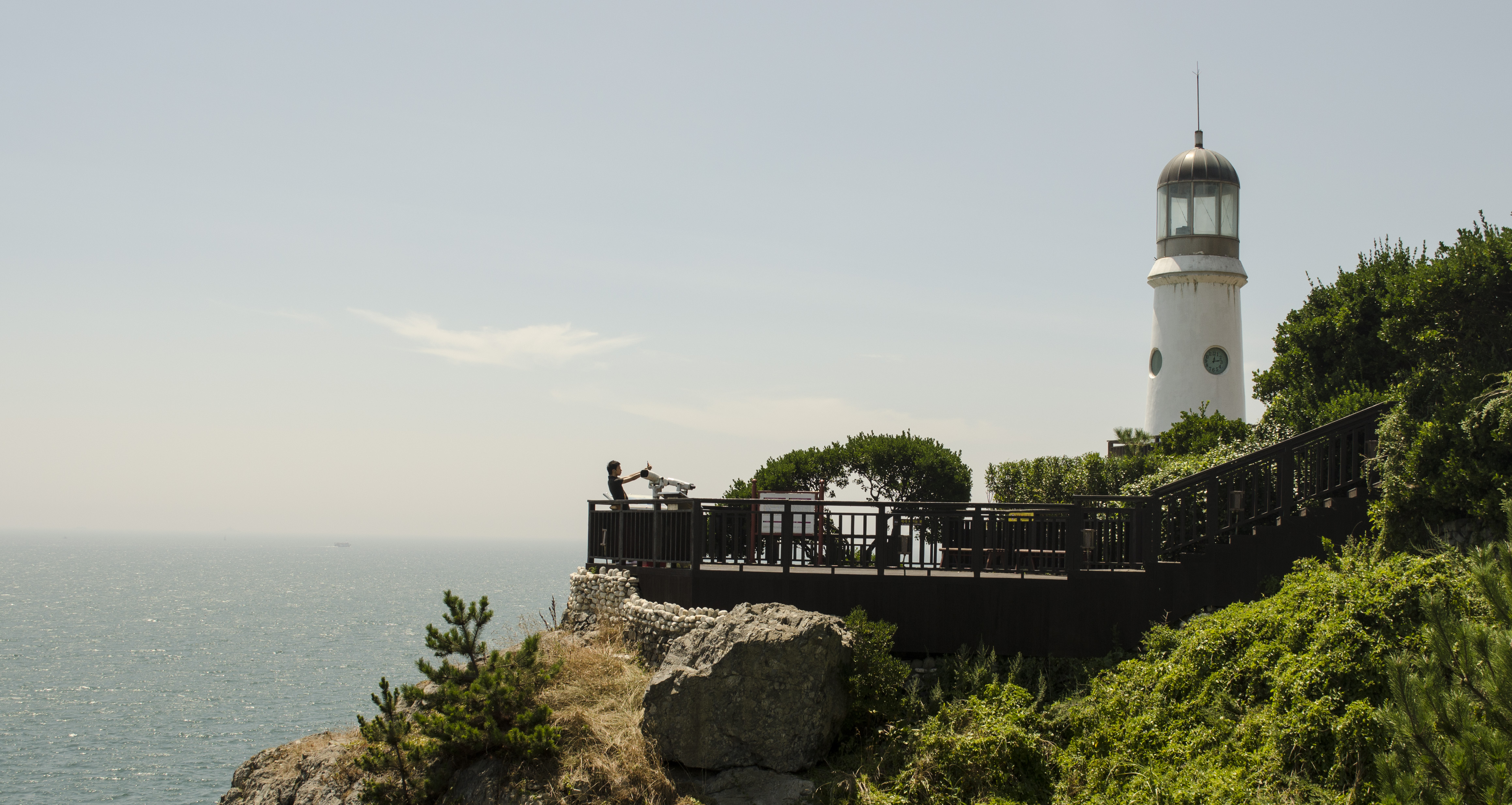
Lighthouse at Haeundae Beach

Haeundae District is divided into 7 legal dong, which altogether comprise 18 administrative dong, as follows:

- U-dong (2 administrative dong)
- Jung-dong (2 administrative dong)
- Jwa-dong (4 administrative dong)
- Songjeong-dong
- Banyeo-dong (4 administrative dong)
- Bansong-dong (3 administrative dong)
- Jaesong-dong (2 administrative dong)

== Notable people ==
- Jeung Eun-ji (Singer, Apink)
- An Jae Mo (Actor)
- Kang Seung-yoon (Singer, WINNER)
- Park Ji-won (Singer, fromis 9)

== Gallery ==
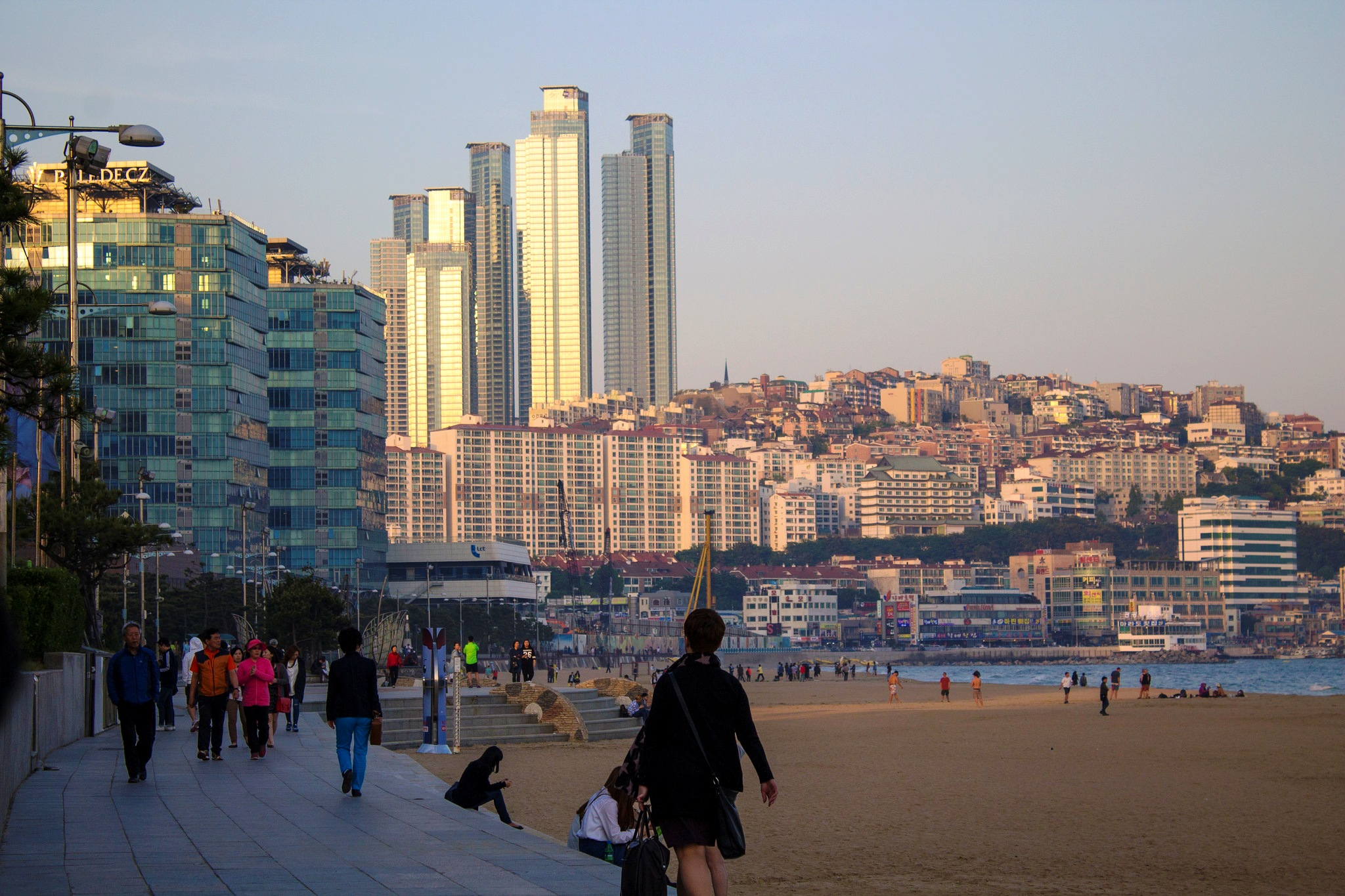
Dalmaji Hill

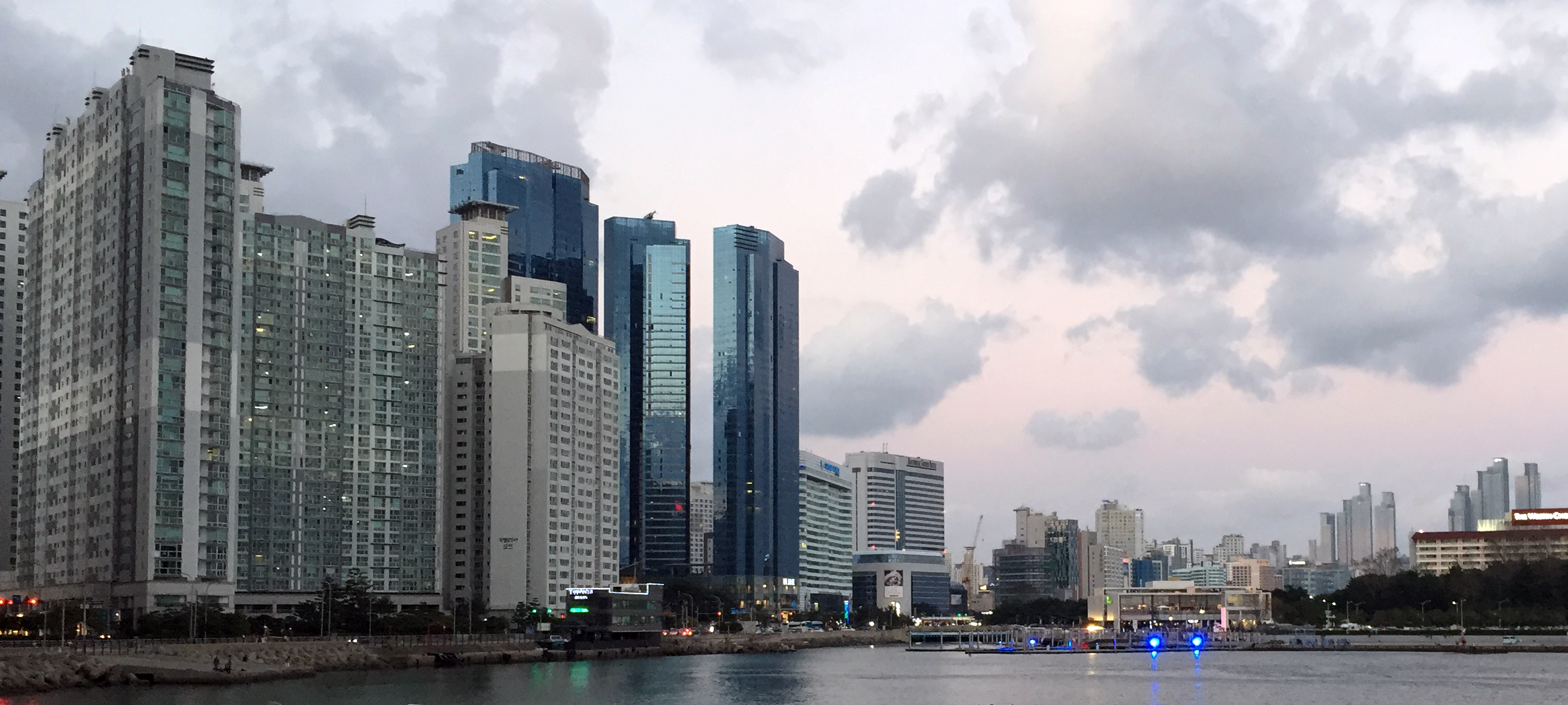
Marine City

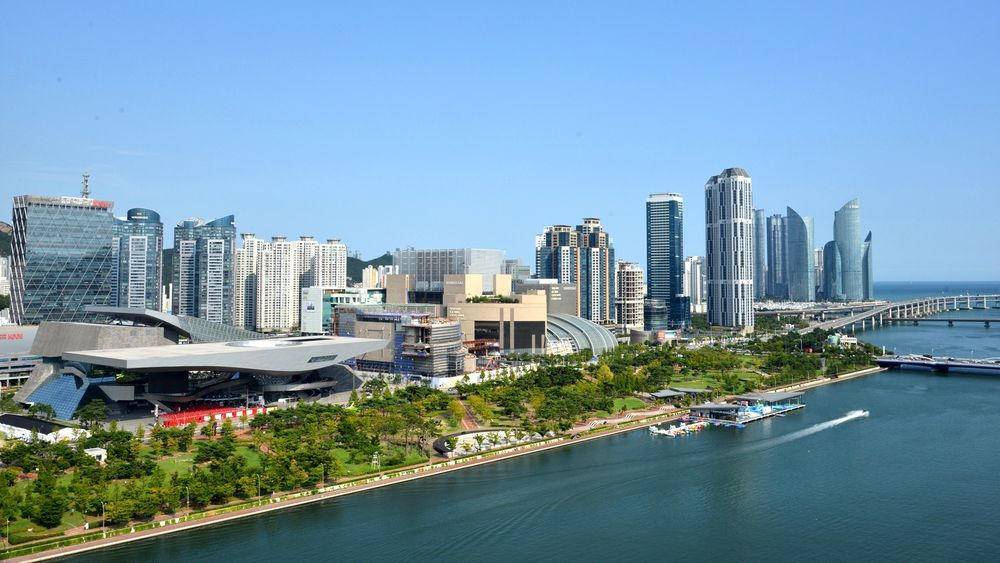
Centum City

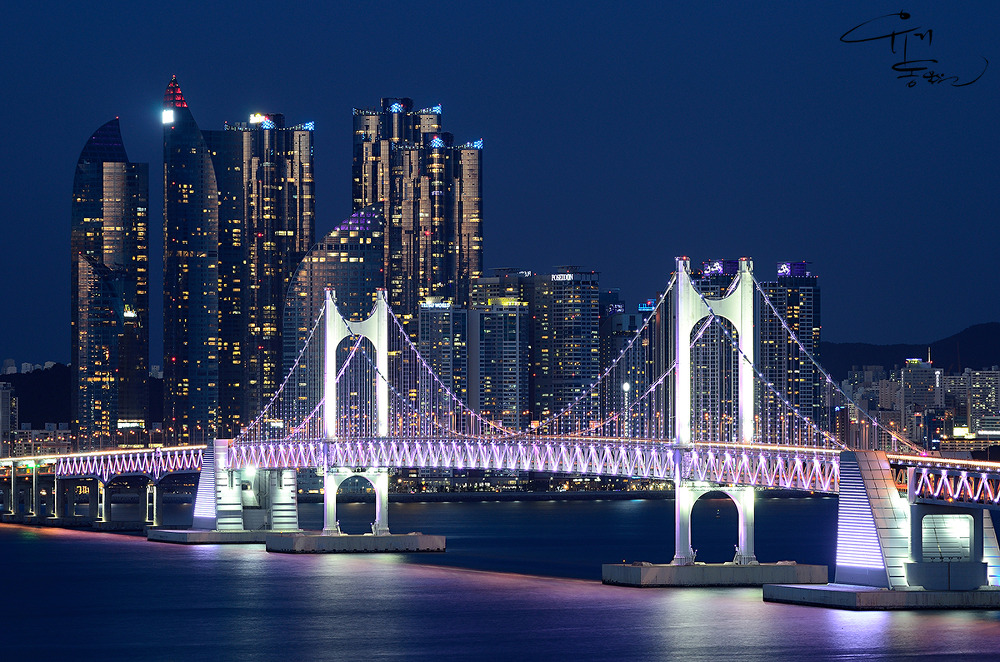
Marine City Night View

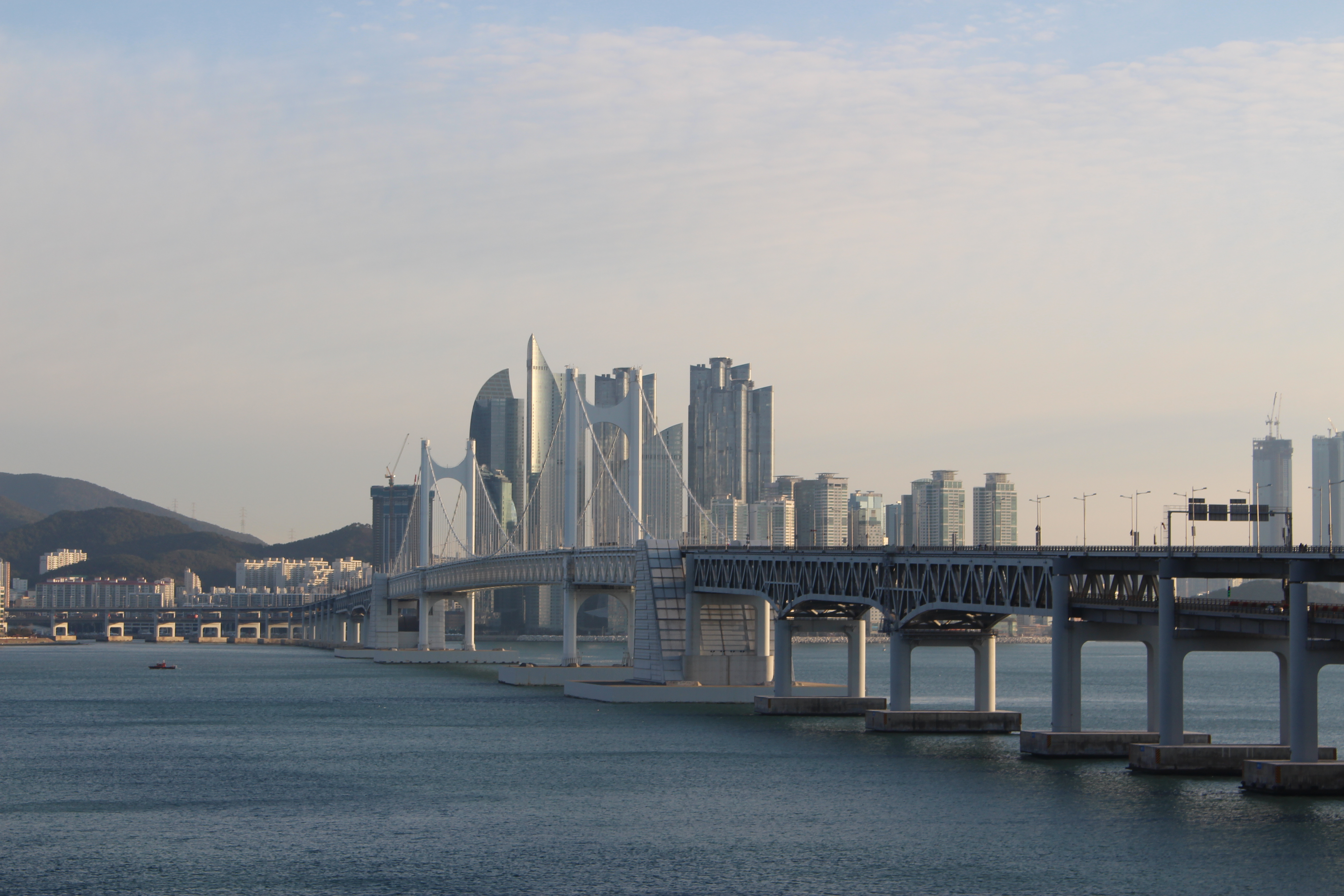
Gwangan Bridge and Marine City

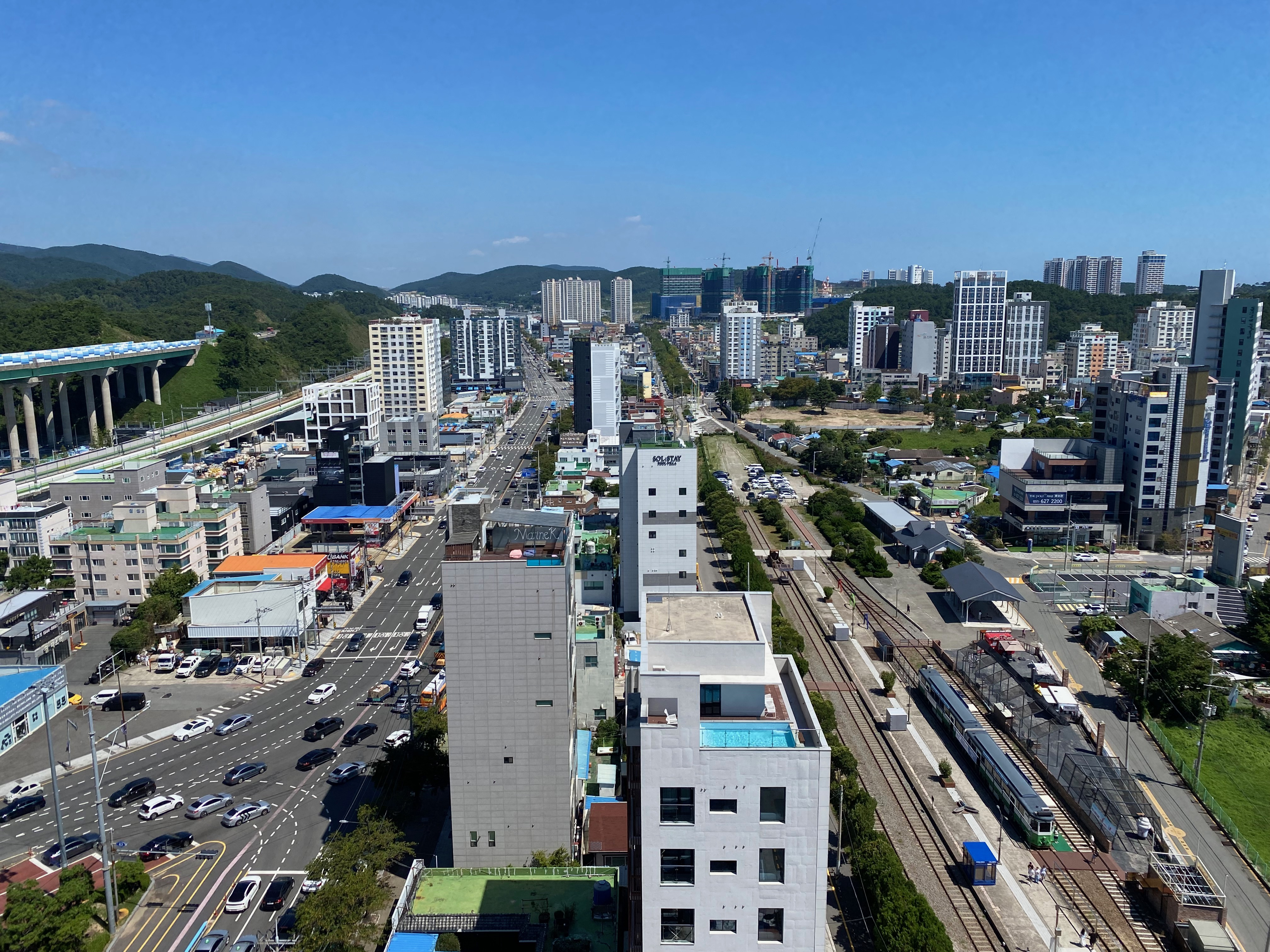
Songjeong-dong looking north, with Donghae Expressway far left

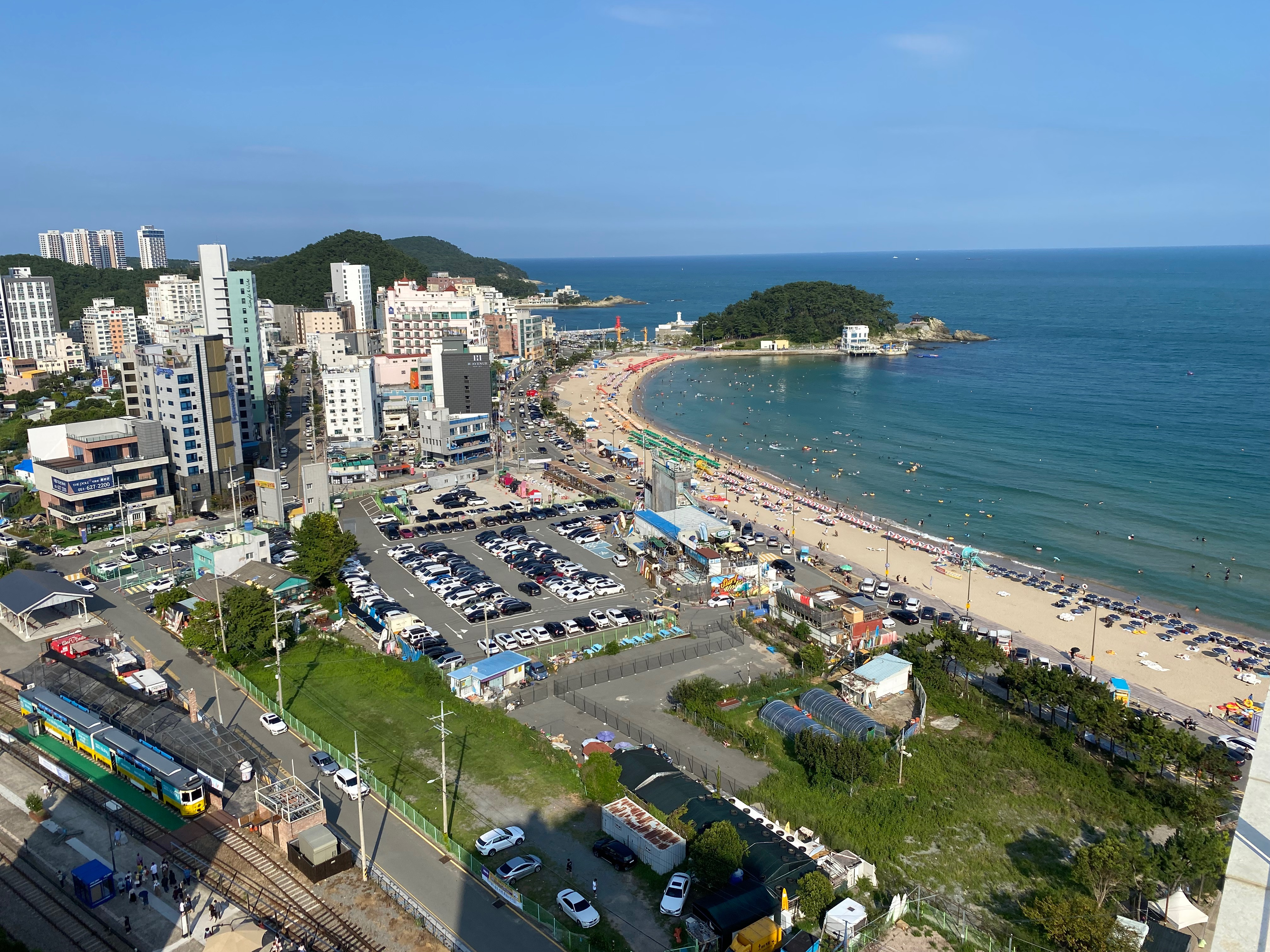
Songjeong Beach looking north

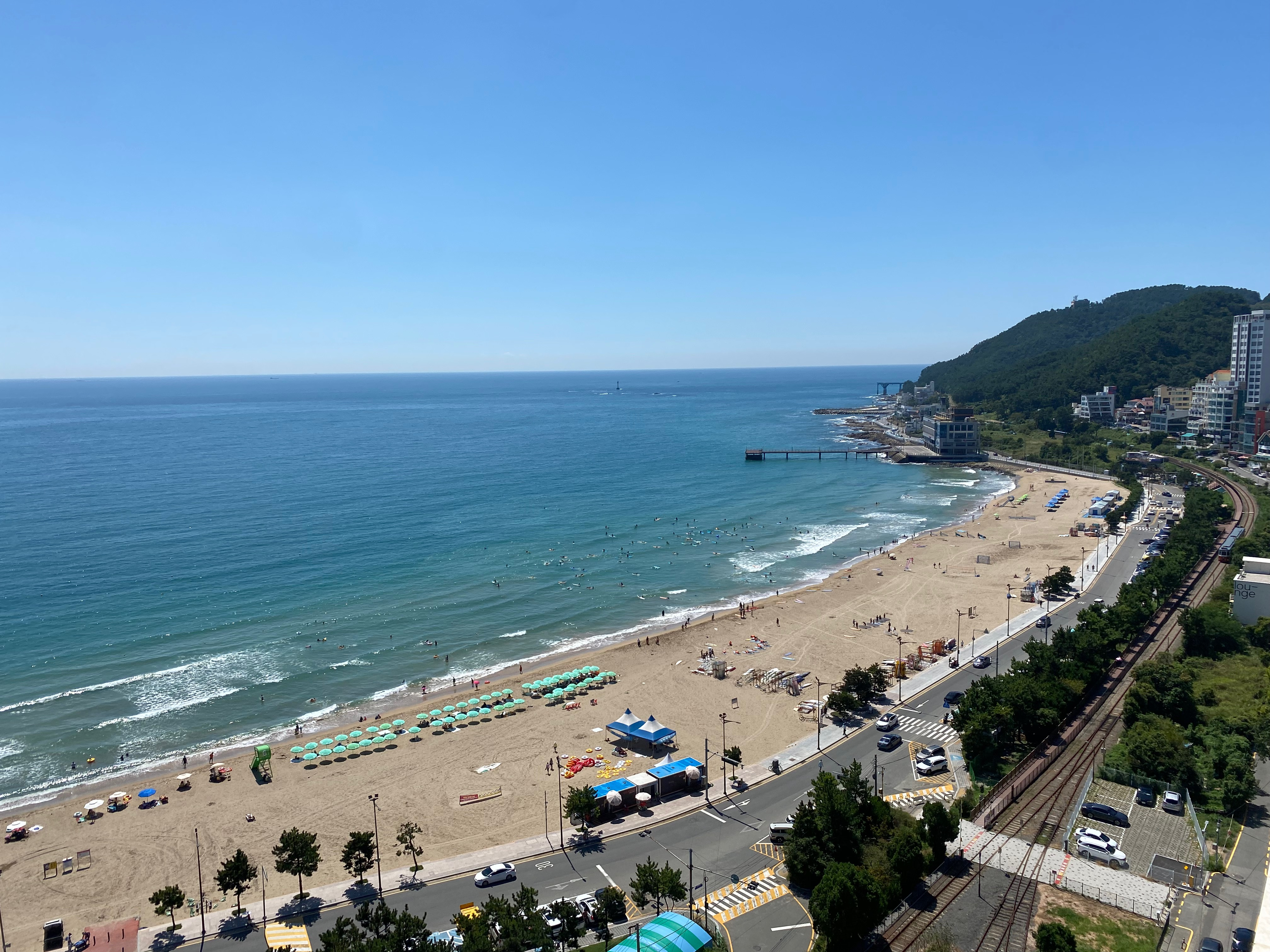
Songjeong beach looking south

== See also ==
- Busan
- Busan International Film Festival
- Geography of South Korea
