= Donghae Expressway =

Road

Expressway No.65
- Donghae Expressway 동해고속도로

Route information
- Part of AH 6
- Length: 203.93 km (126.72 mi)
- Existed: 1975–present

Major junctions
- South end: Gwangan Bridge in Haeundae, Busan
- Ulsan Expressway; Dangjin-Yeongdeok Expressway; Yeongdong Expressway; Seoul-Yangyang Expressway
- North end: Sokcho, Gangwon

Location
- Country: South Korea
- Major cities: Ulsan, Gyeongju, Pohang, Samcheok, Donghae, Gangneung

Highway system
- Highway systems of South Korea; Expressways; National; Local

- Donghae Expressway
- Hangul: 동해고속도로
- Hanja: 東海高速道路
- RR: Donghae gosok doro
- MR: Tonghae kosok toro

Donghae Expressway (Korean: 동해고속도로) is an expressway in South Korea, connecting Busan to Sokcho. It is numbered 65, and it is planned to eventually extend all the way along the east coast to Haeundae, Busan. Its current length is 62.1 kilometres (38.6 mi), and it is part of the Asia Highway Route 6.

In 1966, the South Korean Government and IBRD investigated Gangwon Province and decided to construct a new industrial road connecting Sokcho, Gangneung, and Samcheok. In 1971, the Government decided to construct the Gangneung–Mukho (Donghae City) Section. This expressway was the seventh highway opened in South Korea.

This expressway will connect with Wonsan-Geumgangsan Expressway (원산금강산고속도로) and Wonsan-Hamheung Expressway after Korean reunification.

== History ==
- 26 March 1974: Construction Began
- 14 October 1975: Mojeon–Donghae segment opens to traffic (2 lanes)
- 11 July 1986: Construction started on the Jukheon–Mojeon segment
- 15 December 1988: Jukheon–Donghae segment opens to traffic (2 lanes)
- 20 August 1999: Work begins to widen to 4 lanes on the Hyeonnam–Donghae segment
- November 2001: Construction begins on the Haeundae–Ulsan section
- 26 November 2001: Hyeonnam–Gangneung segment opens to traffic (4 lanes)
- 24 November 2004: Gangneung–Donahae Segment opens to traffic (4 lanes)
- December 2004: Construction begins between Hyeonnam and Sokcho
- 29 December 2008: Haeundae–Ulsan segment opens to traffic (6 lanes)
- 31 March 2009: Construction begins on Donghae–S.Samcheok section
- June 2009: Construction begins on the Ulsan–Pohang segment
- 27 December 2009: Hyeonnam–Hajodae segment opens to traffic
- 21 December 2012: Hajodae–Yangyang segment opens to traffic
- 29 December 2015: Ulsan–S.Gyeongju segment opens to traffic
- 29 December 2015: W.Gyeongju–S.Pohang segment opens to traffic
- 30 June 2016: S.Gyeongju–W.Gyeongju segment opens to traffic
- 9 September 2016: Donghae–S.Samcheok segment opens to traffic
- 24 November 2016: Yangyang–Sokcho segment opens to traffic
- 2020: Pohang–S.Samcheok segment will open to traffic

== Information ==
=== Lanes ===
- Samcheok–Donghae, Jumunjin- Sokcho (68 km, rigid pavement) Busan–Songjeong IC, Donghae IC – Gangneung IC, Gangneung JC – Yangyang IC: 4
- Songjeong IC – Ulsan JC, Gangneung IC – Gangneung JC: 6

=== Lengths ===
- Busan–Pohang:Rigid Pavement 100.83 kilometres (62.65 mi)
- Samcheok–Donghae Rigid Pavement (20.5 km, or 12.73 mi), Jumunjin-Sokcho (rigid pavement, 18.3 km, or 11.37 mi)
- Total: 203.93 kilometres (126.72 mi)

=== Speed limit ===
- All segments of the Donghae Expressway have a speed limit of 100 km/h

== List of facilities ==
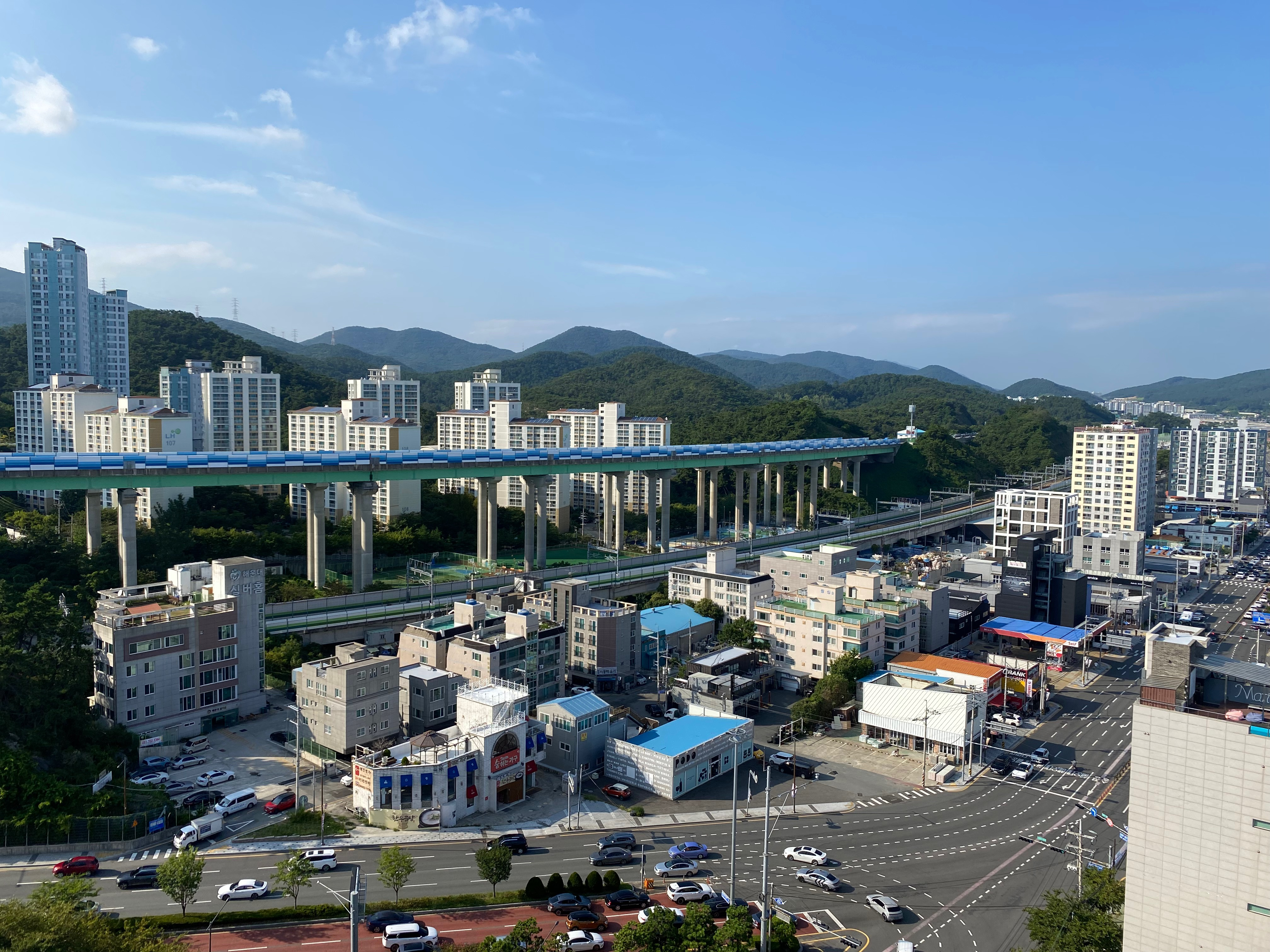
- An elevated section of the expressway (upper left, with blue walls) running through Songjeong near its terminus
  IC: Interchange, JC: Junction, SA: Service Area, TG:Tollgate
  - (■): Busan-Ulsan Expressway (BTL Section)

No.	Name	Korean name	Hanja name	Connections	Distance		Notes	Location	
Connected directly with Gwangan Bridge (Jangsan-ro)
				Gwangan Bridge; Sinhaeundae station Busan Marine City; BEXCO	-	0.00	Expressway Start Spot	Haeundae	Busan
1-1	E.Busan IC	동부산나들목	東釜山나들목	East Busan Tourism Complex; OSIRIA station	4.50	4.50		Gijang	Busan
1	Haeundae IC	해운대나들목	海雲臺나들목	Gijang-daero	1.53	6.03	Sokcho-bound Enter Only; Busan-bound Exit Only	Gijang	Busan
TG	Haeundae·Songjeong TG	해운대·송정요금소	海雲臺松亭料金所				Main Tollate	Gijang	Busan
2	Gijang IC			National Route 14; National Route 31; Busan Metropolitan Road 91	7.89	13.92		Gijang	Busan
2-1	Gijang JC	기장분기점	機張分岐點	Busan Ring Expressway	7.89	13.92		Gijang	Busan
3	Jangan IC	장안나들목	長安나들목	National Route 14; Kori Nuclear Power Plant	5.39	19.31		Gijang	Busan
SA	Jangan SA	장안휴게소	長安休憩所					Gijang	Busan
4	Onyang IC	온양나들목	溫陽나들목	National Route 14, Local Route 1028	10.34	29.65		Ulju	Ulsan
5	Cheongnyang IC	청량나들목	靑良나들목	National Route 14	7.84	37.49		Ulju	Ulsan
5-1	Ulju JC	울주분기점	蔚州分岐點	Hamyang-Ulsan Expressway				Ulju	Ulsan
6	Munsu IC	문수나들목	文殊나들목	National Route 7 ( AH 6)	5.27	42.76		Ulju	Ulsan
7	Ulsan JC	울산분기점	蔚山分岐點	Ulsan Expressway	4.44	47.20		Ulju	Ulsan
8	Cheokgwaguryong IC	척과구룡나들목	尺果九龍交叉路	National Route 14	8.10	55.30		Ulju	Ulsan
SA	Oedong SA	외동휴게소	外東休憩所					Gyeongju	Gyeongbuk
9	S.Gyeongju IC	남경주나들목	南慶州交叉路	National Route 7 ( AH 6); Bulguksa	14.56	69.86		Gyeongju	Gyeongbuk
10	E.Gyeongju IC	동경주나들목	東慶州交叉路	National Route 14; Local Route 929	11.56	81.42		Gyeongju	Gyeongbuk
SA	Yangbuk SA	양북휴게소	陽北休憩所					Gyeongju	Gyeongbuk
TG	S.Pohang TG	남포항요금소	南浦項料金所				Main Tollgate	Pohang	Gyeongbuk
	Ocheon IC	오천나들목	烏川交叉路	Yeongil Bay Bridge (Main Expressway)				Pohang	Gyeongbuk
11	S.Pohang IC	남포항나들목	南浦項交叉路	National Route 31	19.41	100.83		Pohang	Gyeongbuk
12	Yeongilman IC	포항공항나들목	浦項公港交叉路	Yeongilman-daero				Pohang	Gyeongbuk
TG	Yeongilman TG							Pohang	Gyeongbuk
13	N. Pohang IC			Wolpo-ro				Pohang	Gyeongbuk
SA	Pohang SA						Busan-bound only	Pohang	Gyeongbuk
SA	Yeongdeok SA						Sokcho-bound only	Yeongdeok	Gyeongbuk
14	S. Yeongdeok IC			Hoeri-gil				Yeongdeok	Gyeongbuk
15	Yeongdeok JC	청하나들목	淸河交叉路	Seosan-Yeongdeok Expressway				Yeongdeok	Gyeongbuk
Yeongdeok ~ Samcheok section (No. 18 ~ 28) is in conceptual stages
29	Geundeok IC	근덕나들목	近德나들목	National Route 7 ( AH 6)	-	0.00		Samcheok	Gangwon
30	Samcheok IC	삼척나들목	三陟나들목	National Route 7 National Route 38	9.36	9.36		Samcheok	Gangwon
31	Donghae IC	동해나들목	東海나들목	National Route 7	8.70	17.86		Donghae	Gangwon
32	Mangsang IC	망상나들목	望祥나들목	National Route 7	8.24	26.10		Donghae	Gangwon
SA	Donghae SA	동해휴게소	東海休憩所				Busan-bound Only	Donghae	Gangwon
SA	Okgye SA	옥계휴게소	玉溪休憩所				Sokcho-bound Only	Gangneung	Gangwon
33	Okgye IC	옥계나들목	玉溪나들목	National Route 7	6.66	32.76		Gangneung	Gangwon
34	S. Gangneung IC	남강릉나들목	南江陵나들목	National Route 7	17.86	50.62		Gangneung	Gangwon
SA	Gujeong SA	구정휴게소	邱井休憩所					Gangneung	Gangwon
35	Gangneung IC	강릉나들목	江陵나들목	National Route 7 National Route 35; Daegwallyeong	8.21	58.83		Gangneung	Gangwon
36	Gangneung JC	강릉분기점	江陵分岐點	Yeongdong Expressway	2.70	61.53		Gangneung	Gangwon
37	N. Gangneung IC	북강릉나들목	北江陵나들목	National Route 7	7.24	68.77		Gangneung	Gangwon
38	S. Yangyang IC	남양양나들목	南襄陽나들목	National Route 7	9.24	78.01		Yangyang	Gangwon
SA	Yangyang SA	양양휴게소	襄陽休憩所					Yangyang	Gangwon
39	Hajodae IC	하조대나들목	河趙臺나들목	National Route 7 Yangyang International Airport	15.22	93.23		Yangyang	Gangwon
40	Yangyang JC	양양분기점	襄陽分岐點	Seoul-Yangyang Expressway	9.68	102.91		Yangyang	Gangwon
40	Yangyang IC			National Route 44; National Route 56; Local Route 56	9.68	102.91		Yangyang	Gangwon
41	N. Yangyang IC	북양양나들목	北陽分나들목	Seoraksan	10.41	113.32			Gangwon
TG	Sokcho TG							Sokcho	Gangwon
42	Sokcho IC	속초나들목	束草나들목	Local Route 56	8.48	121.80		Sokcho	
Sokcho~Ganseong section is under planning

== See also ==
- Busan-Ulsan Expressway Co., Ltd.
- Roads and expressways in South Korea
- Transportation in South Korea
