= Sinheunggwan =

Chinese restaurant in Busan, South Korea

Restaurant information
- Established: 1954; 71 years ago
- Food type: Korean Chinese cuisine
- Location: 31-1 Jungdong 1-ro, Haeundae District, Busan, South Korea
- Coordinates: 35.1626°N 129.1629°E

Sinheunggwan (Korean: 신흥관; Hanja: 新興館) is a Chinese restaurant in Haeundae District, Busan, South Korea. It was founded in 1954, and is among the oldest active restaurants in Busan and the oldest in Haeundae District. It serves Korean Chinese cuisine, reportedly with Sichuan flavors.

The restaurant was established by ethnic Chinese people in Korea Yun Mu-rim (Korean: 윤무림) and Wang Gwaeng-hyang (Korean: 왕괭향). Yun was from Yantai, Shandong, China. He worked as a trader, and moved through China and Manchuria and eventually arrived in Seoul in the late 1940s. He met his future wife there. When the 1950–1953 Korean War broke out, Yun fled to Busan on his bicycle. He reunited with Wang there and married. The couple founded the restaurant together. The restaurant was located in a kijichon, a camp town near a U.S. military base. After the U.S. troops withdrew, Haeundae became a popular tourist destination. Yun died in 1983, and the business was run by his employees for several years. In the late 1980s, Yun's son Yun Yeong-ho (Korean: 윤영호) took over the business after returning from studying abroad in Taiwan, alongside his Taiwanese wife. The employee who had previously been running the business founded their own business call Munhwagwan (문화관) elsewhere. Even by 2011, the same couple was running the business.

According to one Busan Ilbo reporter, the restaurant has a humble appearance that belies its history. It is a small store in a multi-story office building. It makes its own noodles and broth each morning. In 2011, Yun Yeong-ho reportedly hoped that his son would take over the business, although the son had other plans for his career.
