= Ulsan Expressway =

Road in South Korea

Coordinates: 35.55737°N 129.17965°E

Expressway No.16
- Ulsan Expressway

Route information
- Length: 14.3 km (8.9 mi)
- Existed: 1969–present

Major junctions
- From: Ulju-gun, Ulsan
- To: Nam District, Ulsan

Location
- Country: South Korea

Highway system
- Highway systems of South Korea; Expressways; National; Local

- Ulsan Expressway
- Hangul: 울산고속도로
- Hanja: 蔚山高速道路
- RR: Ulsan gosok doro
- MR: Ulsan kosok toro

The Ulsan Expressway (Korean: 울산고속도로) is a freeway in South Korea, connecting Ulju-gun, Ulsan to Nam-gu, Ulsan.

== Compositions ==
=== Lanes ===
- Eonyang JC - Janggeom IC: 4
- Janggeom IC - Ulsan IC(Sinbok Rotary): 6

=== Length ===
14.30 km

=== Speed limits ===
- 100 km/h

== List of facilities ==
- IC: Interchange, JC: Junction, SA: Service Area, TG:Tollgate

No.	Name	Korean name	Hanja name	Connections	Notes	Location
1	Eonyang JC	언양분기점	彦陽分岐點	Gyeongbu Expressway( AH 1)		Ulju, Ulsan
2	Ulsan JC	울산분기점	蔚山分岐點	Donghae Expressway (Busan~Pohang)		Ulju, Ulsan
TG	Ulsan TG	울산요금소	蔚山料金所		Main Tollgate	Ulju, Ulsan
3	Janggeom IC	장검나들목	長劍나들목	Baekcheon2-gil; Janggeom-gil		Ulju, Ulsan
4	Ulsan IC (Sinbok Rotary)	울산나들목 (신복로터리)	蔚山나들목 (新福로터리)	National Route 7( AH 6); National Route 24; Bukbu Sunhwan-ro; Daehak-ro; Sinbok Overpass(신복고가차도)	Expressway Ending Spot	Nam-gu, Ulsan
Connected directly with Nambu Sunhwan-ro(남부순환로) through Sinbok Overpass(신복고가차도)

== See also ==
- Busan-Ulsan Expressway Co., Ltd.
- Roads and expressways in South Korea
- Transportation in South Korea
- Donghae Expressway
