= Cheongsapo Daritdol Observatory =

Elevated walkway in Busan, South Korea

General information
- Type: Elevated walkway
- Address: 167 Cheongsapo-ro, Haeundae District, Busan, South Korea
- Coordinates: 35.1641°N 129.1967°E
- Completed: September 2017
- Renovated: July 26, 2024

Cheongsapo Daritdol Observatory (Korean: 청사포 다릿돌전망대) is an elevated walkway in Haeundae District, Busan, South Korea. The walkway has transparent floors, and is meant to offer visitors a view of the reefs underneath the path, as well as of the nearby coast of Cheongsapo and of the sea. There is a small circular plaza at the center point of the walkway that is equipped with LED lights.

It is now a popular tourist attraction, with 3.08 million visitors from its opening in September 2017 to July 2024. The structure originally began as a half moon shape. Construction began to expand the structure in 2021. It was completed on July 26, 2024, making it a full loop that returns to the mainland. The completed structure has a total length of 191 m (627 ft) and the path has a width of 3 m (9.8 ft).
