= Jangsan (Busan) =

Mountain in Busan, South Korea

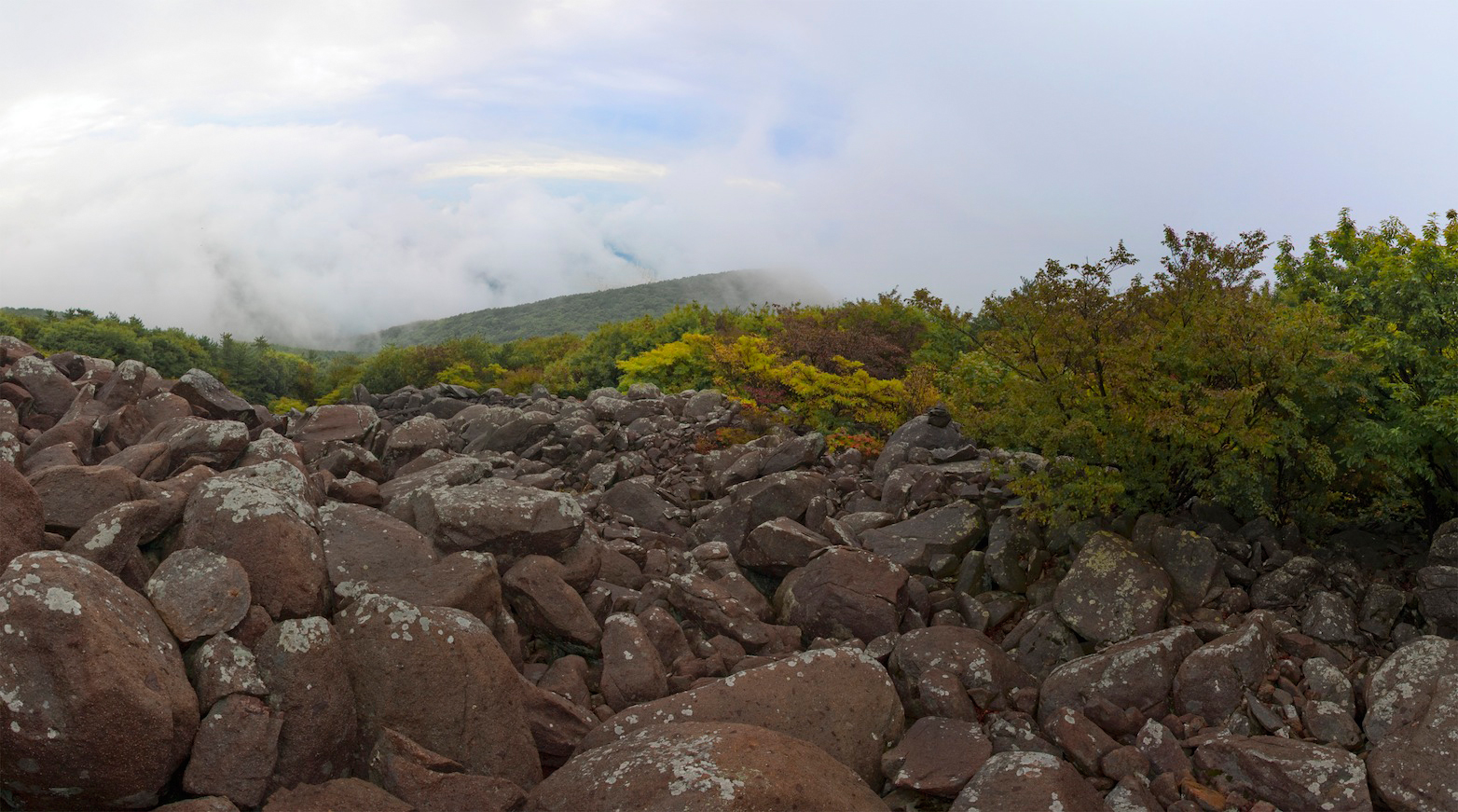

Highest point
- Elevation: 634 m (2,080 ft)
- Coordinates: 35.1940°N 129.1452°E

Geography
- Location: South Korea

Korean name
- Hangul: 장산
- RR: Jangsan
- MR: Changsan

Jangsan (Korean: 장산) is a mountain in Haeundae District, Busan, South Korea. It has an elevation of 634 metres.

== Jangsan Beom ==
The Jangsan Beom is a cryptid that is said to inhabit The Jangsan Mountain. It is a quadruped that is white-furred, and is slightly bigger than a man. It can mimic human voices and other sounds to lure in its prey.

== See also ==
- List of mountains of Korea
