= Dongbaekseom =

Former island in Busan, South Korea

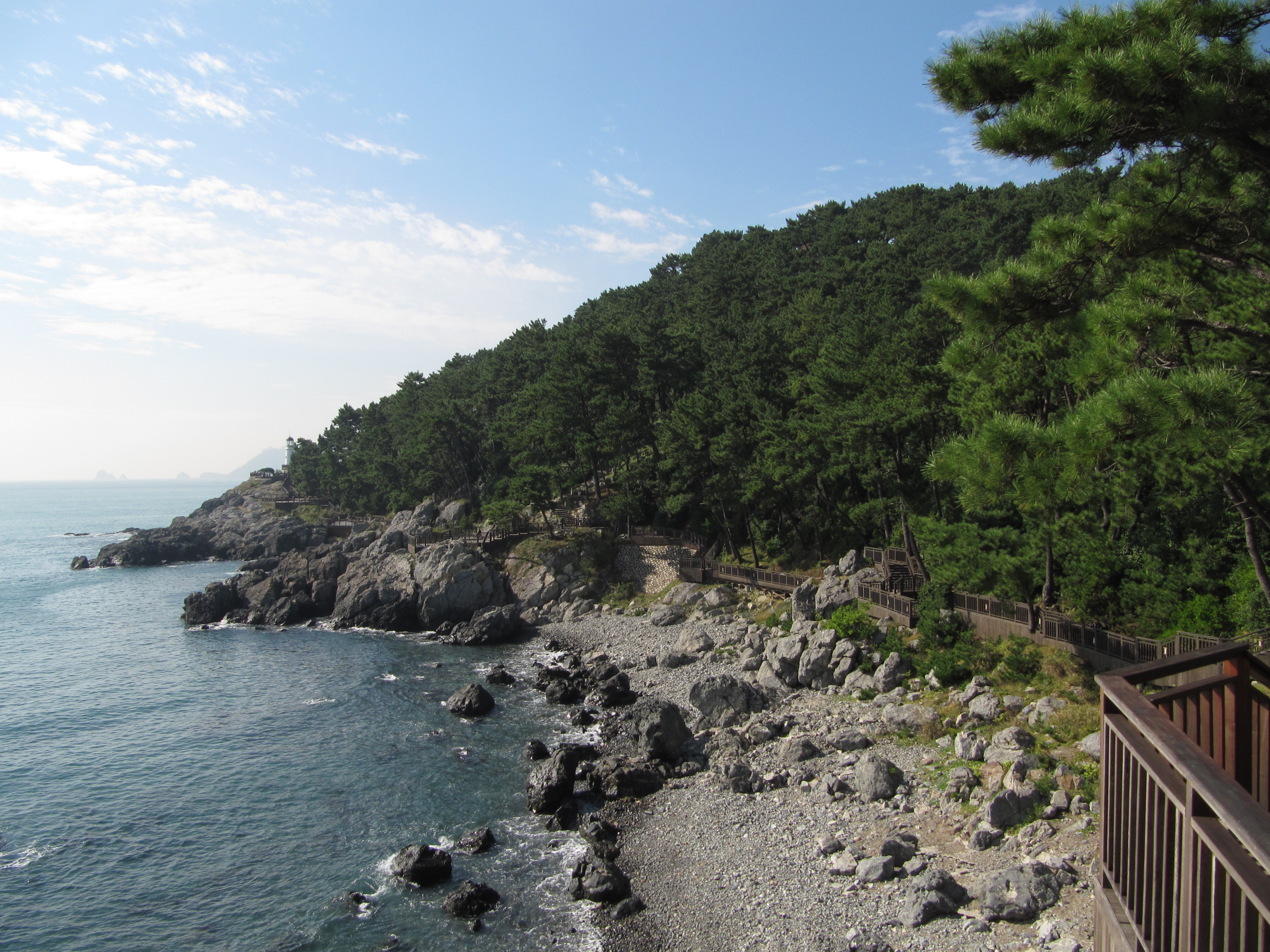
- Dongbaekseom's coast (2010)
- Interactive map of Dongbaekseom

Geography
- Coordinates: 35.1538°N 129.1521°E

Korean name
- Hangul: 동백섬
- Hanja: 冬柏섬
- Lit.: Camellia island
- RR: Dongbaekseom
- MR: Tongbaeksŏm

Old name
- Hangul: 동백도
- Hanja: 冬柏島
- RR: Dongbaekdo
- MR: Tongbaekto

Dongbaekseom (Korean: 동백섬) is a former island in U-dong, Busan, South Korea. It is located on the west end of the Haeundae Beach. It was designated as a monument of Busan on March 9, 1999.

== History ==
As the name suggests, the area used to be an island, but now is a part of the mainland. This happened gradually as a result of soil accumulation between the island and mainland. It is named for Camellia flowers, which reportedly bloom in abundance in it.

It has long been considered a scenic location. Poet Ch'oe Ch'i-wŏn visited the place. At present, it offers views of Gwangang Bridge and Haeundae Beach. A trail is built around Dongbaekseom, and traces of people from the past and the present are carved in various places, including Choi Chi-won's Haeundae, statues, and inscriptions, as well as Princess Hwangok's legendary mermaid statue and Nurimaru APEC House.
