= Jangsan (Gangwon) =

Mountain in Gangwon-do, South Korea

Highest point
- Elevation: 1,408 m (4,619 ft)
- Coordinates: 37°07′35″N 128°51′35″E

Geography
- Location: South Korea

Korean name
- Hangul: 장산
- Hanja: 壯山
- RR: Jangsan
- MR: Changsan

Jangsan (Korean: 장산) is a mountain between Taebaek and Yeongwol County, Gangwon Province, South Korea. It has an elevation of 1,408 m (4,619 ft).

== See also ==
- List of mountains in Korea
