= Gwangan Bridge =

Gwangandaegyo
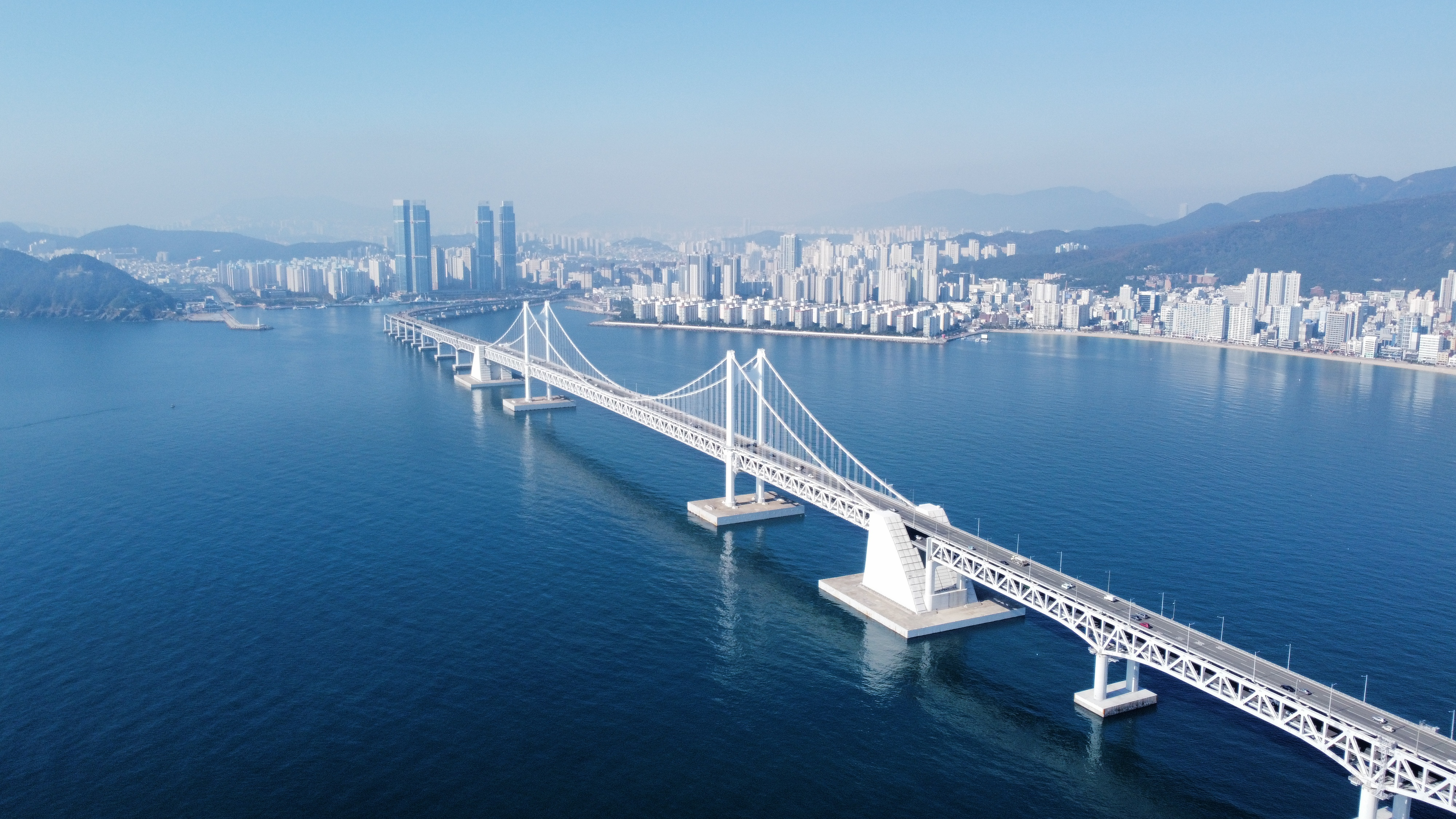
- Gwangandaegyo from the air; September 2022
- Coordinates: 35°8′46.8″N 129°7′43.1″E
- Carries: 8 lanes of automobile traffic
- Locale: Busan, South Korea
- Official name: Gwangandaegyo

Characteristics
- Design: suspension bridge
- Total length: 900 metres (3,000 ft) (main span); 7,420 metres (24,340 ft) (whole bridge)
- Width: 24 metres (79 ft)
- Height: 116 metres (381 ft)
- Longest span: 500 metres (1,600 ft)

History
- Construction start: 1994
- Construction end: 2002
- Opened: 2003

Korean name
- Hangul: 광안대교
- Hanja: 廣安大橋
- RR: Gwangan daegyo
- MR: Kwangan taegyo

Location
- Interactive map of Gwangandaegyo

The Gwangan Bridge (Korean: 광안대교) or Diamond Bridge is a double-decked suspension bridge located in Busan, South Korea. It connects Haeundae District to Suyeong District. The road surface is about 6,500 metres long, with the bridge as a whole spanning 7,420 metres. It is the second longest bridge in the country after the Incheon Bridge.

Construction began in 1994 and concluded in December 2002, with a total cost of 789.9 billion won. The bridge opened temporarily in September and October 2002 for the 2002 Asian Games. However, it was not officially opened until January 2003.

== History ==
The bridge made international headlines in February 2019 when a Russian cargo ship (which had just left from the Port of Busan and was heading to Vladivostok) crashed into the bridge. As a result, a five-metre wide hole was torn into the lower part of the bi-level bridge, but there were no injuries reported. The ship's captain was allegedly inebriated at the time of the crash, which may have contributed to the incident.

== Notes ==
1. "Project Overview". Busan Metropolitan City Facilities Management Authority (BMFA) website. Archived from the original on 2006-08-11.
2. 광안대교 소개 (Gwangandaegyo Sogae) (Introduction to Gwangan Great Bridge). Archived from the original on 2005-02-11.
3. How to ride Gwangan Bridge

== See also ==
- Busan
- Busan International Fireworks Festival
- Transportation in South Korea
- List of bridges in South Korea
- Donghae Expressway
