= Haeundae Beach =

Beach in Busan, South Korea

- Beach
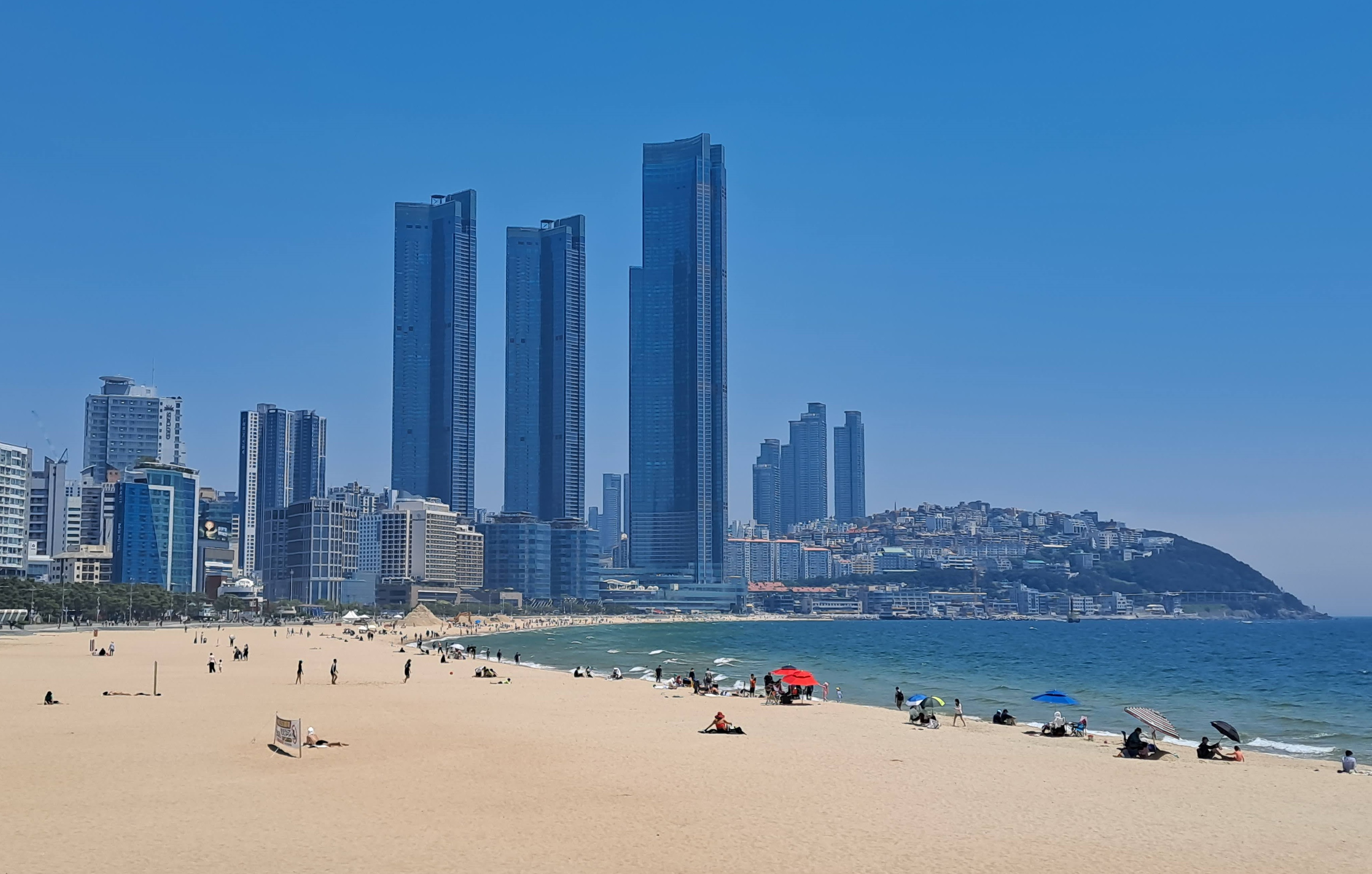
- The beach (2024)
- Interactive map of Haeundae Beach
- Coordinates: 35.15855°N 129.16053°E
- Location: Busan, South Korea
- Water bodies: Sea of Japan

Dimensions
  - Length: 1.46 km (0.91 mi)
  - Width: 0.04 km (0.025 mi)

Korean name
- Hangul: 해운대해수욕장
- Hanja: 海雲臺海水浴場
- RR: Haeundae haesuyokjang
- MR: Haeundae haesuyokchang

Haeundae Beach (Korean: 해운대해수욕장) is an urban beach in Busan, South Korea, located in the eponymous Haeundae District.

It is one of Busan's most popular tourist attractions and one of South Korea's most popular beaches. It is open around the year, and hosts a variety of events, including the Haeundae Sand Festival and Busan International Film Festival.

== Description ==
Haeundae Beach is considered one of the most famous beaches in Korea, attracting over 10 million visitors every season. It can accommodate around 120,000 people.

The sandy portion of the beach is 1.46 kilometres (0.91 mi) long and 40 m (130 ft) wide. It has a parking lot that is handicap accessible. Its average depth is 1m.

In 2008, the beach set the Guinness World Records for most beach umbrellas: 7,937.

=== Events ===
Various festivals are held there throughout the year. Since 1988, the Polar Bear Festival (북극곰 축제) has been held annually in January. During the event, several thousand people bathe in the beach's near-freezing water. There is also Haeundae Sand Festival, the only sand-related eco-festival in Korea, during which artwork made of sand is featured and activities are available for visitors. Haeundae also hosts the Busan International Film Festival, and appeared in the 2009 disaster film Tidal Wave. The beach has also hosted e-sports events for games like StarCraft. Concerts, including some that involve floating stages, have been held at the beach.

=== Surroundings ===
The beach has a number of attractions nearby. At the west end of the beach is the former island Dongbaekseom, which is now part of the mainland. It has long been famed for its beauty. Also nearby are the Haeundae Hot Springs, the islands Oryukdo, tourist road Dalmaji-gil, APEC Naru Park, Sea Life Busan Aquarium, and a wide variety of leisure and night life establishments. Several high rises, such as the LCT Towers, are visible from the beach.

== History ==
The beach was originally a fishing area for people in the area. It began to be used more as a leisure space in the late 19th century. During the 1910–1945 Japanese colonial period, Japanese settlers taught their children to swim at the beach. During the 1950–1953 Korean War, the U.S. military was stationed at the beach and prepared it for landing ships. U.S. soldiers also used it for recreation.

The beach first opened in 1965, and was the largest beach in the country at the time. It was designated a special tourist area in 1994, and various leisure facilities were constructed in larger numbers then. The beach has been subject to erosion over time; the area of the sandy portion decreased by 54% from 1947 to 2004. The local government has taken a variety of measures to combat this. It has installed underwater breakwaters and adds sand to the beach each year.

== Gallery ==
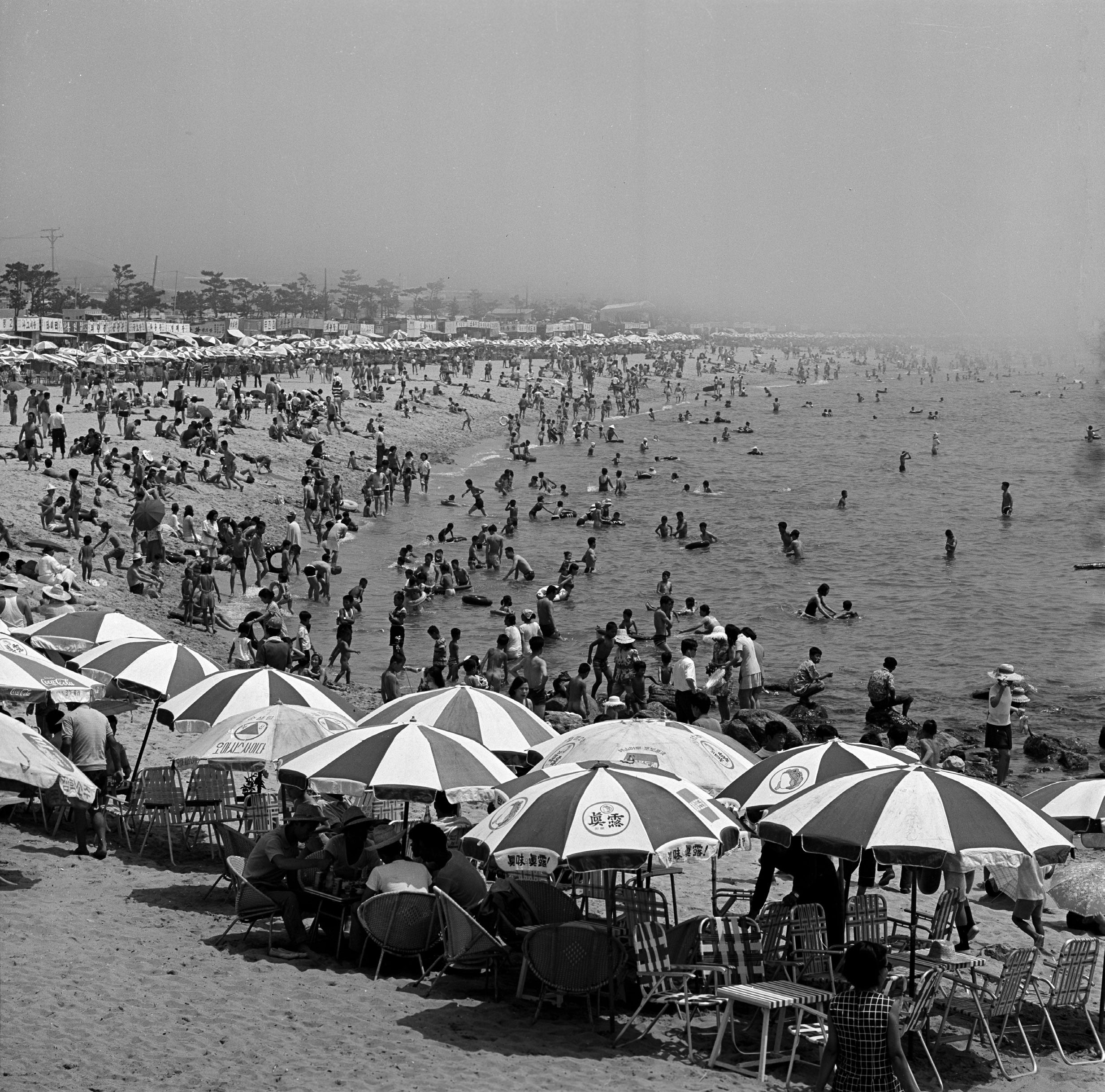
The beach in 1973

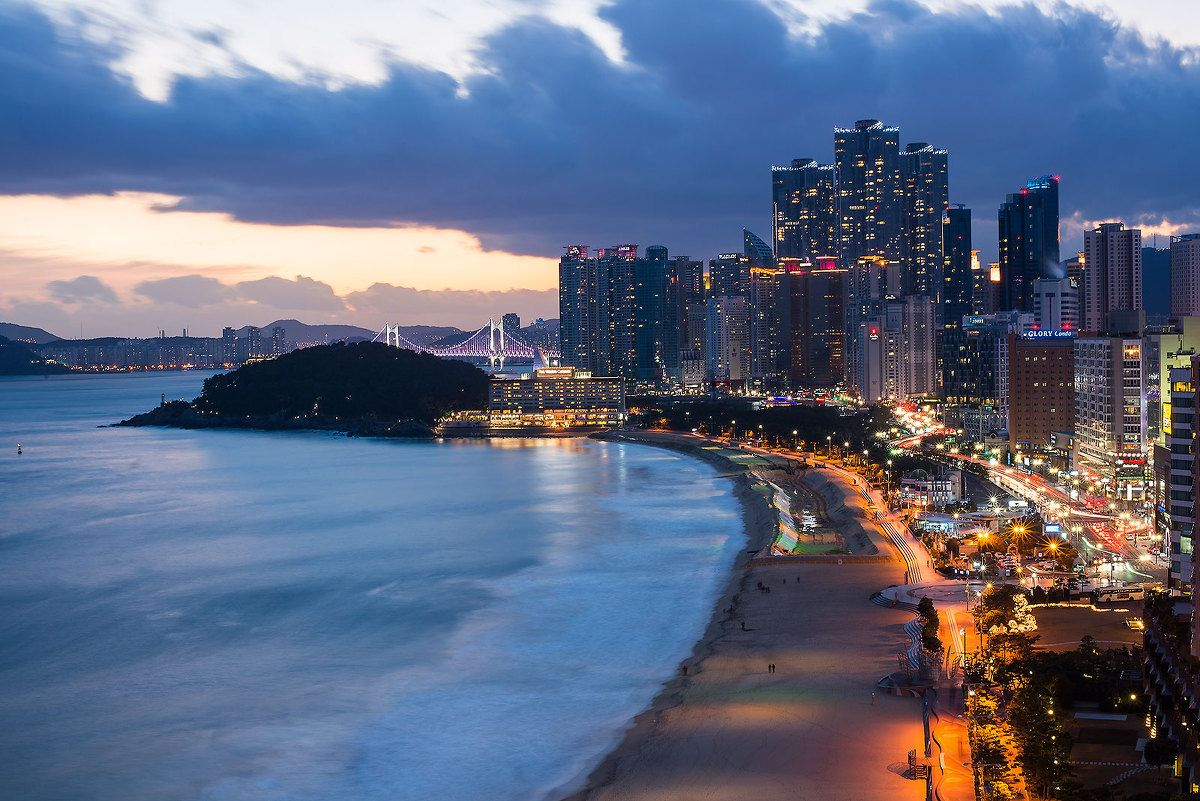
The beach at night (2019)

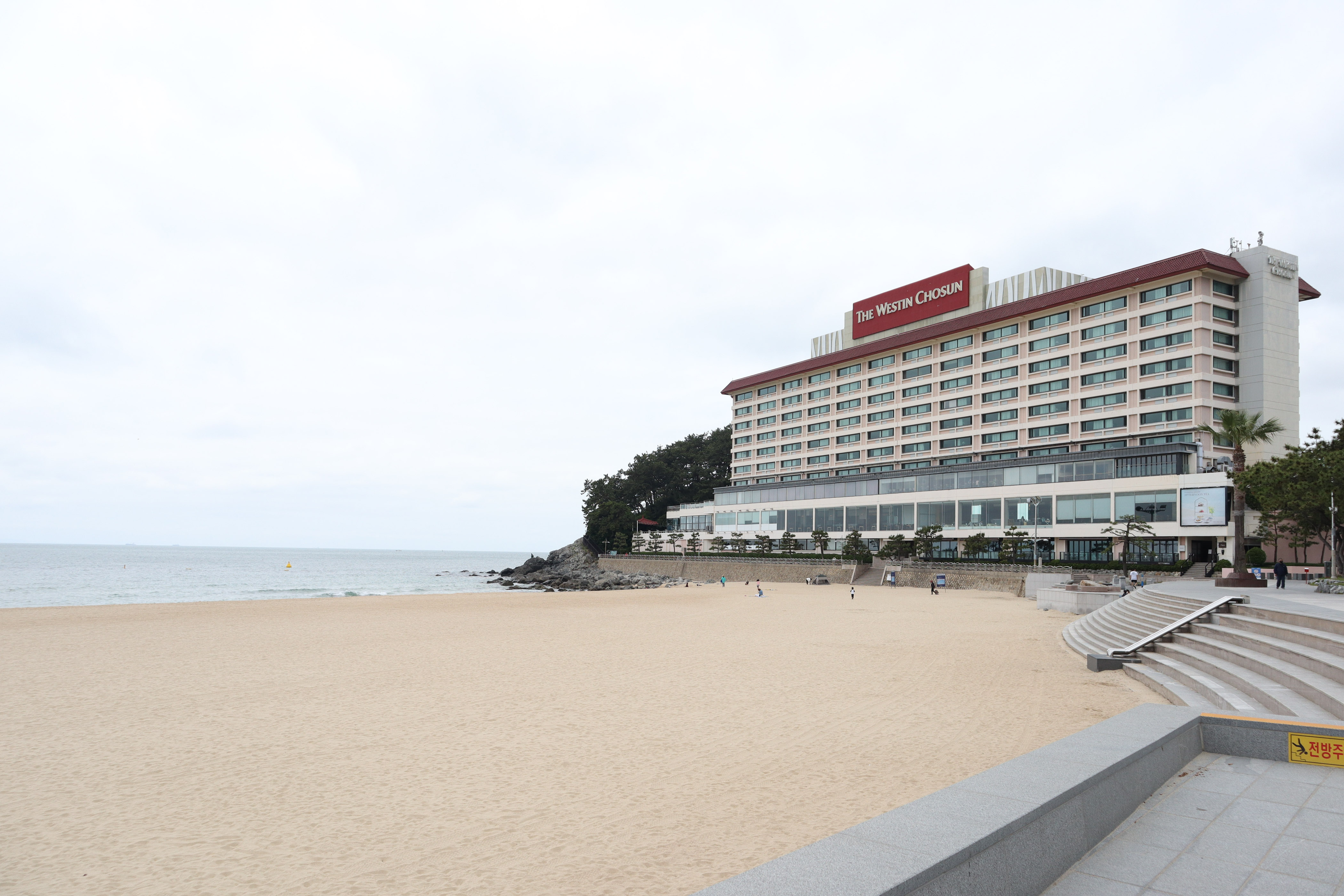
The Westin Josun at the west end of the beach (2020)

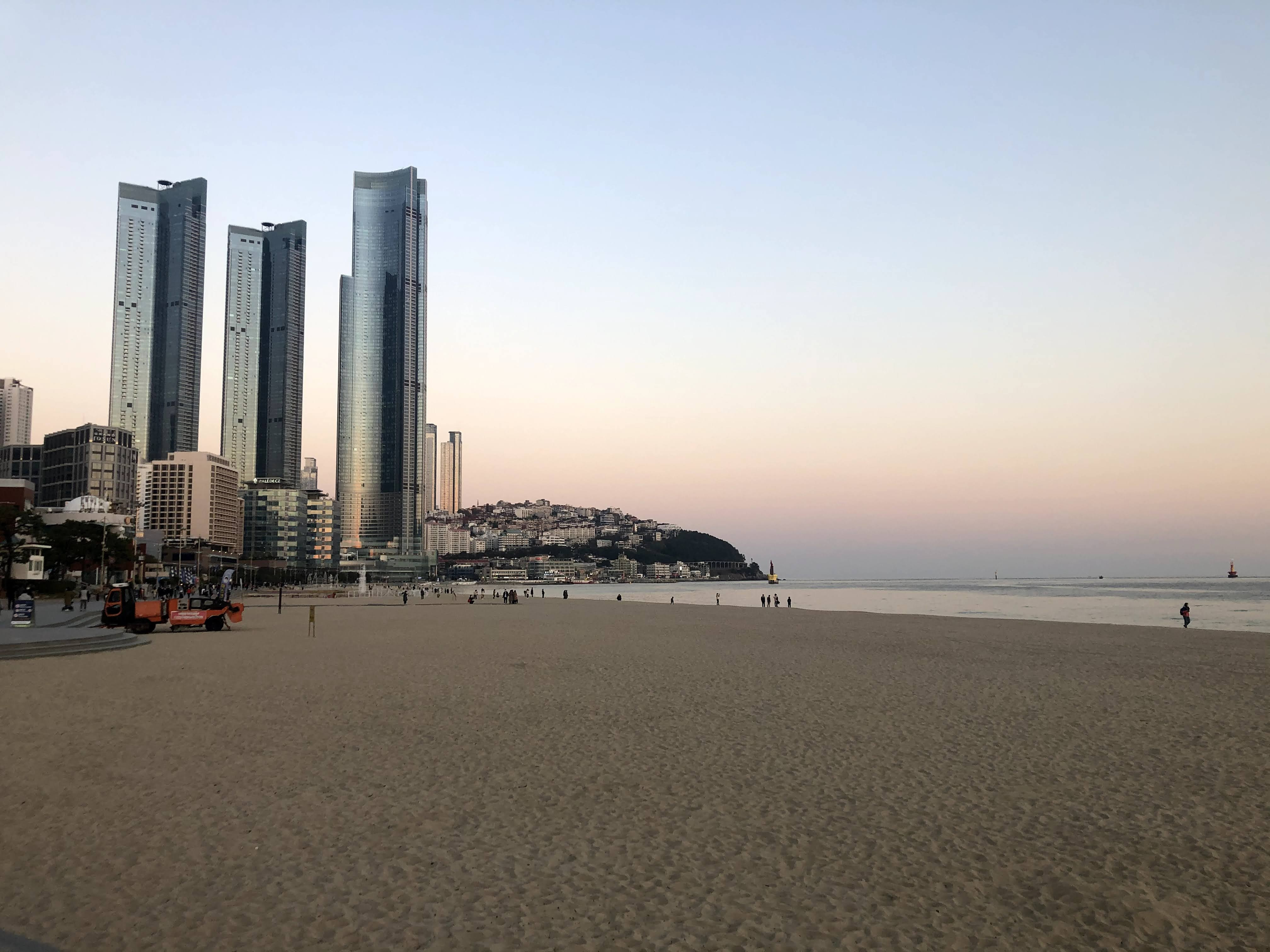
Facing east, towards LCT The Sharp (2021)

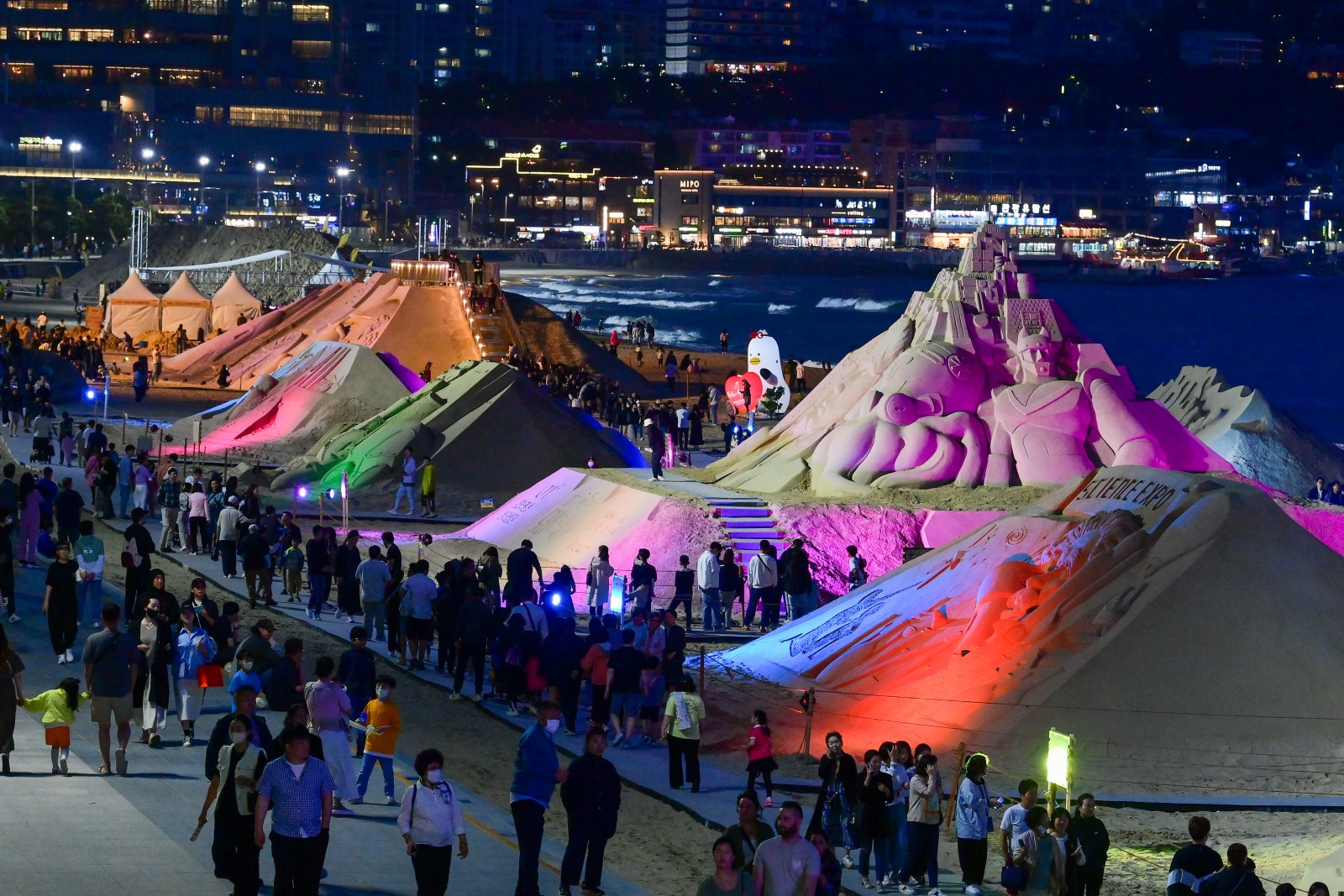
Haeundae Sand Festival

== See also ==
- Haeundae District
- Busan
- Tourism in South Korea
