= Pu San =

Pu San or Pusan or variation, may refer to:

== Places ==
- Busan (a.k.a. "Fusan", formerly spelled "Pusan", also rendered "Pu-san" and "Pu San"), South Korea
  - Port of Busan (formerly spelled "Port of Pusan")
  - Pusan National University
  - Pusan National University of Technology
  - Pusan International Airport
  - Pusan East (K-9) Air Base, USAF
  - Pusan West Air Base (K-1), USAF and ROKAF
  - Pusan–Kyongnam Area (PK), the metropolitan area of Busan
  - Diocese of Pusan (disambiguation)
  - Pusan Harbor Bridge
- Pusan Strait, separating Korea from Japan
- Pusan Road station, Shanghai Metro, Shanghai, China

== People, figures, characters ==
- Pusan (god), a Hindu deity

== Military ==
- Battle of Pusan, several battles
  - Battle of Pusan Perimeter (1950) of the Korean War
  - Battle of Korea Strait (Battle of Pusan Strait; 1950)
  - Battle of Pusan (1597)
  - Battle of Pusan (1592)
  - Siege of Pusan (1592)
- ROKS Pusan, a Fletcher-class destroyer of the South Korean navy

== Arts and entertainment ==
- Mr. Pu (Pu-san), a 1953 Japanese film produced by Sanezumi Fujimoto and directed by Kon Ichikawa
- Pu-San, a 1952 Japanese manga comic book created by Taizo Yokoyama

== Other uses ==
- Pusan Broadcasting Corporation
- Pusan Bank

== See also ==
- San (disambiguation)
- Pu (disambiguation)
- Poo (disambiguation)
- Pooh (disambiguation)
- Busan (disambiguation)
- Fu San (disambiguation)
- Sanpu railway station (San Pu)
