= Busan (disambiguation) =

Busan or Pusan (Korean: 부산; Hanja: 釜山; RR: Busan) is the second-largest city of South Korea.

Busan or Bu San or similar, may refer to:

== Places ==
- Busan-myeon, a myeon (township) in Jangheung County, Jeollanam-do, South Korea
- Busan, the modern site of the Ancient city and bishopric Bosana (Syria), now a Latin Catholic titular see

=== Bridges ===
- Busan Bridge
- Busan Bridge, an old name of Yeongdo Bridge
- Busan Harbor Bridge

=== Ports ===
- Busan Harbor
- Busan Naval Base

=== Stations ===
- Busan Station, a railway station

=== Sports ===
- Busan Asiad Main Stadium
- Busan Yachting Center

== People and characters ==
- Cha Bu-san, a fictional character from South Korean TV show Will It Snow for Christmas?
- Park Bu-san, a fictional character from South Korean TV show All About My Romance

== Institutions ==
=== Museums ===
- Busan Museum
- Busan Marine Natural History Museum
- Busan Modern History Museum
- Korea National Maritime Museum

=== Universities ===
Busan

- Busan Arts College
- Busan Institute of Science and Technology
- Busan National University of Education
- Busan University of Foreign Studies, also known as "Pusan University of Foreign Studies"

Pusan

- Pusan National University

== Other uses ==
- Busan International Film Festival
- Busan International Fireworks Festival
- Goodbye, Dragon Inn (不散, "Bu san"), 2003 Taiwanese film

== See also ==
- Fu San (disambiguation)
- Pu San (disambiguation)
- San (disambiguation)
- BU (disambiguation)
- Boo (disambiguation)
- San Bu
