= Krypto Saves the Day! =

2025 DC Studios animated shorts

- Genre: Superhero
- Based on: Krypto by: Otto Binder; Curt Swan; Sy Barry
- Written by: Ryan Kramer; David Gemmill; Careen Ingle
- Directed by: Ryan Kramer; David Gemmill; Careen Ingle
- Composer: Paul Fraser
- Country of origin: United States
- Original language: English
- No. of seasons: 2
- No. of episodes: 7

Production
- Executive producers: James Gunn; Peter Safran; Sam Register
- Producers: Ryan Kramer; Mike Baum
- Editors: Nick Simotas; Andy Young; Michael D’Ambrosio
- Running time: 5 minutes
- Production companies: Troll Court Entertainment; The Safran Company; Warner Bros. Pictures; DC Studios; Warner Bros. Animation

Original release
- Network: HBO Max; YouTube Kids; Cartoon Network
- Release: August 13, 2025 – present

Related
- Superman; Supergirl

Krypto Saves the Day! is an American short-form animated series based on the DC Comics character Krypto the Superdog. Although James Gunn has stated that it is not canon to the DC Universe (DCU) series of films and television series, it was released as a follow-up to the film Superman (2025), and later Supergirl (2026), as Krypto gets involved in various adventures in Metropolis and beyond. The series premiered on August 13, 2025, with its first episode, "School Bus Scuffle". The second season premiered on September 10, 2026.

== Premise ==
The series follows Krypto the Superdog going on lighthearted adventures in Metropolis and beyond.

== Characters ==
Although the series has no voice acting, as it is presented in the form of classic slapstick, silent film-style Saturday-morning cartoons—focusing on visual events, action, physical comedy, and animated body and facial language accompanied by soundtrack, sans dialogue and with only limited text—it centers around animated depictions of DC Comics characters, in addition to original characters, largely based on caricatures of their appearances in the cinematic DC Universe. It follows the adventures of Krypto the Superdog, the companion animal of Clark Kent / Superman and/or Kara Zor-El / Supergirl (in different versions), both of whom appear alongside him in the series.

=== Main and recurring characters ===
Out of the central trio of characters—Krypto, Superman, and Supergirl—Krypto is the only character to appear in every episode of the series, while Superman appears in each episode apart from the season two premiere, "Space Busted", and Supergirl appears in each episode beginning with the season one finale, "Coastal Catastrophe". Superman initially serves as Krypto's primary caregiver in the series, before Supergirl, who first appears in a cameo role in "Coastal Catastrophe", takes over care of Krypto in "Space Busted", after which the two appear to co-parent him as dual guardians.

Lobo appears in a cameo capacity in two consecutive episodes of season two, "Space Busted" and "Robo-Pal".

A school bus driver from the pilot episode, "School Bus Scuffle", reappears in a different occupation as a train driver within a flashback in the season two episode, "Tales of Puppy Past". Similarly, a mailman from the season one episode "Package Pandemonium" returns in the same flashback, performing as a professional street Santa.

=== Existing DC characters ===
Aside from Krypto, Superman, Supergirl, and Lobo, other existing DC characters in the series include Lex Luthor, Angela Spica / Engineer, Rex Mason / Metamorpho and his son Joey Mason, and the kaiju from Superman (2025), all appearing in the season two episode "Robo-Pal". Several unnamed aliens on a galactic spaceship bus appear in "Space Busted", as a reference to the creatures on the Wormhole Xpress seen in Supergirl (2026).

=== Guest appearances ===
==== Season 1 ====
In the pilot episode, "School Bus Scuffle", Krypto chases a provocative pigeon, and almost causes a school bus driver to crash before saving him and the children. The driver would later reappear in a different occupation as a train driver within a flashback in the season two episode, "Tales of Puppy Past".

In the second episode, "Halloween Havoc", Krypto chases a black cat who challenges him, and Krypto subsequently steals candy from a candy truck driver to distribute freely to trick-or-treaters for Halloween after destroying children's candy bags.

In the third episode, "Package Pandemonium", Krypto chases a mailman character in an attempt to steal his package, then at the end sees Santa Claus and begins to chase after him instead. The mailman would later reappear in a different occupation performing as a professional street Santa within a flashback in the season two episode, "Tales of Puppy Past".

In the fourth episode, the season one finale "Coastal Catastrophe", as Supergirl initially makes a brief cameo, surfing alongside a series of animals (seagull, crab, turtle, jellyfish and whale) whom Krypto consecutively chases to retrieve his stolen hot dog, he almost causes then prevents the crash onto a beach of a ship with a helmsman inside. Beginning with this episode, Supergirl would appear in every subsequent episode of the series.

==== Season 2 ====
In the season two premiere, "Space Busted", as Supergirl returns to take over care of Krypto and take him to a dog park, they encounter several unnamed aliens on a galactic spaceship bus, as a reference to the creatures on the Wormhole Xpress seen in Supergirl (2026). Lobo makes a cameo appearance watching on, who also reappears in the following episode, "Robo-Pal".

In the second episode of season two, "Robo-Pal", in addition to the return of Lobo, Lex Luthor makes his first appearance, alongside his robotic dog ARF (Autonomous Robot Fido)—who was deployed to eliminate Superman and Supergirl but ends up befriending Krypto and turning on Luthor—as well as characters including Angela Spica / Engineer, Rex Mason / Metamorpho and his son Joey Mason, a monkey Luthor had seemingly conducted mind experiments on, a kaiju from Superman (2025), and an elderly knitting woman.

In the third episode of season two, "Tales of Puppy Past", alongside the return in a flashback of the school bus driver from the pilot episode "School Bus Scuffle" in a different occupation as a train driver, and of the mailman from the season one episode "Package Pandemonium" performing as a professional street Santa, a taxi driver character also appears in the same flashback to carry the mailman / street Santa to safety as Krypto chases after him.

== Episodes ==
| Season | Episodes | Originally released | |
| Season | Episodes | First released | Last released |
|---|---|---|---|
| 1 | 4 | August 13, 2025 | April 18, 2026 |
| 2 | TBA | September 10, 2026 | TBA |

=== Season 1 (2025–26) ===
| No. overall | No. in season | Title | Directed by | Written by | Original release date |
|---|---|---|---|---|---|
| 1 | 1 | "School Bus Scuffle" | Ryan Kramer | Ryan Kramer | August 13, 2025 |
While Clark Kent / Superman isn't looking, Krypto chases a provocative pigeon he sees through the window in Metropolis City, and in the process almost causes a school bus to fall off a bridge before saving it with all the passengers inside, leaving the school bus driver injured but grateful. Afterward he sees the pigeon again and resumes the chase.
| 2 | 2 | "Halloween Havoc" | Ryan Kramer | Ryan Kramer | October 1, 2025 |
Krypto chases a child's black cat that challenges him during trick-or-treat for Halloween, while Superman searches for more candy to dispense to the public. After destroying several upset children's candy bags during the chase, Krypto subsequently steals masses of candy from a candy truck driver to distribute freely, resulting in the driver coming to the house and charging Superman over $1000 for the entire truck of candy, as Krypto spots the cat taunting him with his bone and chases after them again.
| 3 | 3 | "Package Pandemonium" | Ryan Kramer | Ryan Kramer | November 28, 2025 |
Krypto chases a mailman in an attempt to steal his package that he could smell, containing a steak, which Superman had secretly ordered for Krypto as a Christmas gift anyway. Along the way, Krypto wrecks, then after feeling guilty subsequently fixes, a snowman, ice skating rink and Christmas tree that families and children were enjoying, using his laser eyes (heat vision) and cold breath abilities to melt and re-freeze, and his flight and super strength to repair. After Superman bestows him the gift, Krypto sees Santa Claus and begins to chase after him too, desiring his larger gift haul.
| 4 | 4 | "Coastal Catastrophe" | David Gemmill | David Gemmill | April 18, 2026 |
At the beach with Superman, Krypto contends with a series of several animals that keep stealing his hot dog—a seagull, a crab, a turtle, a jellyfish, and finally a whale—with Krypto consecutively chasing each one to retrieve it before another snatches it off him, while encountering a surfing Kara Zor-El / Supergirl along the way. After accidentally creating a tidal wave by dropping the whale into the ocean from the sky, Krypto then has to stop a ship from crashing onto the beach with a helmsman inside unable to control it, which is heading toward all the beachgoers as well as the animals he vied with. Krypto tries freezing the water underneath the ship but it simply turns into a floating sheet of ice and continues carrying the ship toward the beach at high speed. He then melts the ice but the ship doesn't slow down enough. Finally, Krypto uses his tail as a high-speed propeller in the ocean combined with his super strength to push against the ship and halt its movement just before it reaches the sand, saving everyone from the consequences of his own actions once again. Krypto and Superman are able to finally relax on the beach, but the hot dog washes ashore inside a bottle which Krypto gets stuck on his nose, unable to retrieve it.

=== Season 2 (2026) ===
| No. overall | No. in season | Title | Directed by | Written by | Original release date |
|---|---|---|---|---|---|
| 5 | 1 | "Space Busted" | Ryan Kramer | Ryan Kramer | September 10, 2026 |
With Krypto now under Supergirl's care, she forcefully takes him on a trip to a dog park in space, accompanying several aliens on a galactic spaceship bus, the Wormhole Xpress. (Note: As seen in Supergirl (2026).) Krypto, initially believing it to be an unwanted veterinary visit, repeatedly attempts to escape, accidentally ejecting the alien driver before Supergirl takes control of the bus, until he becomes excited and trusting upon their arrival and realizing the destination. Meanwhile, a stunned and confused Lobo passing on his motorbike catches a glimpse of the bus being bumped around by Krypto from the inside, and stops in his tracks to watch it. Krypto briefly runs around the park at superspeed before the bus honks, needing to move on, and he voluntarily and happily gets back in and lets Supergirl drive them away. The alien driver then floats by in a parachute, left behind.
| 6 | 2 | "Robo-Pal" | Careen Ingle | Careen Ingle | October 1, 2026 |
While Krypto plays in a park in Metropolis as Superman and Supergirl watch over him, they encounter a kaiju that the latter two begin to fight with. (Note: As seen in Superman (2025).) Meanwhile, in the LuthorCorp Tower, Lex Luthor attempts to train a robotic dog named ARF (Autonomous Robot Fido) to eliminate Superman and Supergirl. However, once deployed, ARF encounters Krypto and ends up befriending him and categorizing him as "friend". Krypto and ARF begin to play around with their environment, encountering multiple characters including Angela Spica / Engineer, Rex Mason / Metamorpho and his son Joey Mason, and Lobo, whom ARF magnetizes via his motorbike and launches through the window of a room where an elderly woman is knitting. Frustrated with the lack of progress, Luthor descends to the park from the sky along with his mind-controlled monkey he had been experimenting on, and reprimands ARF for not following orders. After destroying his ball as punishment, Krypto attacks Luthor, and seeing the two of them fighting, ARF re-categorizes Luthor from "friend" to "threat" and turns on him, with the two dogs launching him into the same elderly woman's window where Lobo is now knitting alongside her. They then find Superman and Supergirl still fighting the kaiju and join in the fight.
| 7 | 3 | "Tales of Puppy Past" | David Gemmill | David Gemmill | November 5, 2026 |
As Superman, Supergirl and Krypto celebrate Christmas in current day, they look over photos in a holiday scrapbook of previous Christmases together and remember them fondly with laughter as flashbacks commence. For a young Krypto's first Christmas, he was overjoyed and energetic when Supergirl brought him to see Superman, and as the two cousins set up decorations, he broke out of his cage and wrecked the whole interior of the house. On another Christmas, while Superman and Supergirl installed fairy lights outside on the front porch, Krypto came out and tied up Superman in the cables while wrapping them around the building, causing him to be shocked by electricity when Supergirl connected the power. In the third and final Christmas flashback, as Superman and Supergirl watched television, Krypto used his heat vision to sever his leash and sneak outside, sighting a man dressed as Santa (Note: The mailman from the previous Christmas episode, "Package Pandemonium", in a different occupation.) on the street and immediately chasing after him. On the way, he created a hole in a train track by knocking a pillar over, and subsequently repaired it with two giant candy canes before the train rolled across. (Note: Driven by the school bus driver from the first episode, "School Bus Scuffle", in a different occupation.) Lunging again for the street Santa, who was then applauding the save along with an audience of pedestrians before running away, Krypto knocked a wrecking ball from a construction site into the front of Superman's house, destroying the wall to his dismay. Back in the present, Superman and Supergirl realize Krypto has disappeared, but find him upstairs having decorated the house himself. They take photos together, before the final shot captures Krypto stealing Superman's Santa hat and flying off.

== Production ==
=== Development ===
In February 2025, an animated series of four shorts surrounding the character Krypto was announced. The release of the DC Universe (DCU) film Superman led to an increase in dog adoptions as Krypto quickly became a popular character.

Following the release of the first episode, James Gunn confirmed that they are not canon to the DCU.

=== Writing ===
The first episode was written by Ryan Kramer, who also directed it. Each episode is themed around a specific season, with the second episode themed around Halloween, the third around winter and the fourth around summer.

Superman appears in the series, marking his second animated appearance in the DCU after his appearance in the Creature Commandos episode "Chasing Squirrels" (2024).

=== Design and animation ===
Krypto, like in the film Superman, was modeled on Gunn's dog Ozu. His mannerisms were made to be the same as in Superman, such as having a single ear stick up. His design is less smooth and more textured than previous iterations of the character, particularly in connection to the Cartoon Network series Krypto the Superdog (2005–2006). Superman's design as Clark Kent is based on David Corenswet, his actor in the live-action film.

The logo used the colors of Superman's suit, as well as his "S"-shaped emblem. Surrounding the emblem are shapes that represent Superman's trunks, as well as Krypto's collar. This design was praised by The Direct as it looked like the comics.

== Release ==
The first episode, "School Bus Scuffle", was released as a bonus feature alongside the digital, Blu-Ray, and Ultra HD Blu-Ray release of Superman to promote the rest of the series, as well as on Fandango's website and YouTube two days earlier, August 13, 2025. The second episode, "Halloween Havoc", released October 1, 2025. At this point, it was assumed by sources such as The Direct that the remaining episodes would not reveal until 2026, but the third episode, "Package Pandemonium", was released that November 28 for a holiday-themed episode. The fourth episode was released in 2026 on YouTube. The series also premiered on Cartoon Network on September 20, 2025.

== Reception ==
The episodes had received millions of views by December 2025.

Sabina Graves of Gizmodo praised the continuity between the film and series versions of Krypto, expressing excitement that Krypto's mannerisms were the same as in Superman (2025). Gillian Blum with The Direct said that the first episode felt like a one-shot comic. Superman's appearance in the episodes gave hope to The Direct writer Klein Felt at the interconnected nature of the new DC Universe (DCU) franchise and for the canon to be maintained. Nerdist praised the cartoon as a "cute cartoon adventure".

Talking about the first episode, SlashFilm called it "cute" and "funny". They likened the series to the Marvel One-Shots, self-contained stories which either answered questions or spent time with beloved characters from the Marvel Cinematic Universe (MCU). Writer Rafael Motamayor was happy that the episodes expanded on the DCU without the feeling that they are necessary to understand the next installment of the franchise. Similarly, IGN said that, "It doesn't come close to providing any earth-shattering DCU revelations, but it's a cute story that gives fans a few more minutes with one of the standout characters in Superman".

The Direct praised the Christmas setting of the third episode, saying it was "sure to make DC fans' Yuletide gay." Writer Nathan Johnson particularly found it funny that Krypto chases Santa Claus at the end of the episode.

The Direct defended the existence of the show at all, particularly due to their non-canon status to the DC Universe, from perceived fan questioning. They described the series as simply "fun little releases for children and hardcore fans" without having to stay within a strict canon. They also noted the possibility of expanding to other non-canon material, which they viewed as positive. The Direct also suggested that the series could be used as a tax write-off since the shorts were released on YouTube without a means of profiting off of them.
