= Poo poo (disambiguation) =

Poo poo is colloquial term for feces.

Poo poo, or variants, may also refer to:

== Arts, entertainment and media ==
- PuPu, a fictional piglet in the 1998 Japanese film The Story of PuPu
- Pupu Tupuna, a series of Finnish children's books and the name of the protagonist
- PooPoo Patel, a character in the film National Lampoon's Pledge This!

== Other uses ==
- Pooh-pooh, a fallacy in informal logic
- Pu pu platter, a tray of American Chinese or Hawaiian food
- Poopoo, an island of Hawaii
- Poo Poo Point, a bare shoulder of West Tiger Mountain in Washington, U.S.

== See also ==
- Poo (disambiguation)
- Poop (disambiguation)
- Pooh (disambiguation)
- Poopó (disambiguation)
- Pupupu, setting for the Manga series Kirby of the Stars
- Pupu Springs, or Te Waikoropupū Springs
