= Melanella pandata =

Scientific classification
- Kingdom: Animalia
- Phylum: Mollusca
- Class: Gastropoda
- Subclass: Caenogastropoda
- Order: Littorinimorpha
- Family: Eulimidae
- Genus: Melanella
- Species: M. pandata

Binomial name
- Melanella pandata (A. Adams, 1861)

Synonyms
- Eulima pandata A. Adams, 1861

Species of gastropod

Melanella pandata is a species of sea snail, a marine gastropod mollusk in the family Eulimidae. The species is one of many species known to exist within the genus, Melanella.

== Description ==
(Original description in Latin) The shell is awl-shaped, slender, and flexuous, with a spire that is inclined laterally. It consists of eight flattened whorls, the last of which is elongated and produced anteriorly. The aperture is oblong and widened anteriorly. The inner lip is thin, while the outer lip is arched. The shell is milky white and semi-opaque.

== Distribution ==
This species occurs in the Korea Strait
