= Fu San =

Fu San or Fusan or variant, may refer to:

- Busan (a.k.a. "Pusan", formerly spelled as "Fusan" during Japanese occupation, also rendered "Fu-san" and "Fu San"), a city in South Korea
  - Port of Busan (formerly "Fusan Harbour" during Japanese occupation)
- Huang Fu-san, Taiwanese historian
- Zhao Fusan, Chinese scholar of Christian studies

== See also ==
- San (disambiguation)
- Fu (disambiguation)
- Foo (disambiguation)
- Busan (disambiguation)
- Pu San (disambiguation)
- San Fu (constituency)
