= I've Got a Secret =

American game show

- Title card for the original 1952–1967 version
- Genre: Game show
- Created by: Allan Sherman, Howard Merrill
- Directed by: Franklin Heller (1956–1967)
- Presented by: Garry Moore; Steve Allen; Bill Cullen; Stephanie Miller; Bil Dwyer
- Composers: Leroy Anderson; Norman Paris; Steve Allen; Edd Kalehoff; Score Productions; Tim Mosher; Alan Ett; Scott Liggett
- Country of origin: United States
- No. of episodes: CBS (1952–1967): 681; Syndication (1972–1973): 39; CBS (1976): 4 Oxygen (2000–2001): 120; GSN (2006): 40

Production
- Producers: Mark Goodson; Bill Todman; Allan Sherman; Chester Feldman
- Running time: 22–26 minutes
- Production companies: Goodson-Todman Productions (1952-1960, 1972-1976); Telecast Enterprises (1960-1967); The Carsey-Werner Company (2000-2001); Burt Dubrow Productions (2006); Get Real Entertainment (2006)

Original release
- Network: CBS
- Release: June 19, 1952 – April 3, 1967
- Network: Syndicated
- Release: 1972 – 1973
- Network: CBS
- Release: June 15 – July 6, 1976
- Network: Oxygen
- Release: 2000 – 2001
- Network: GSN
- Release: April 17 – June 9, 2006

Related
- What's My Line? To Tell the Truth

I've Got a Secret is an American panel game show produced by Mark Goodson and Bill Todman for CBS television.

Created by comedy writers Allan Sherman and Howard Merrill, it was a derivative of Goodson–Todman's own panel show, What's My Line? Instead of celebrity panelists trying to determine a contestant's occupation, as in What's My Line, the panel tried to determine a contestant's secret: something that is unusual, amazing, embarrassing, or humorous about that person.

The original version of I've Got a Secret premiered on CBS on June 19, 1952, and ran until April 3, 1967. The show began broadcasting in black and white and switched to color in 1966, when all commercial prime-time network programs in the US began to be produced in color.

The show was revived for the 1972–1973 season in once-a-week syndication and again from June 15 to July 6, 1976, as a summer replacement series on CBS. Oxygen launched a daily revival series in 2000, which ran until 2001. A second revival by GSN premiered on April 17, 2006, and aired new episodes daily until June 9, 2006.

== Hosts and panelists ==
The show was originally hosted by radio and television personality Garry Moore. After several months of an ever-changing panel, game show host Bill Cullen, acerbic comedian Henry Morgan, TV hostess Faye Emerson, and actress Jayne Meadows became the four regular panelists. In 1958, Emerson left the show to star in a play and was replaced by actress Betsy Palmer.

Later that year, Meadows relocated to the West Coast and was replaced by former Miss America Bess Myerson. At various times, guest hosts substituted for Moore, including panelists Cullen, Morgan and Palmer, among others. Other comedians and celebrities appeared as guests on the panel when others were away. The announcer for most of the 1952–67 run was John Cannon.

Moore left the show after the 1963–64 season. After his comedy program The Garry Moore Show was canceled, Moore chose to retire from television to travel the world with his wife. Moore was replaced by Steve Allen, who had signed with CBS-TV in March 1964 and left his own syndicated talk show to take over the game, on September 21, 1964. Allen also hosted the show during the 1972−73 revival. Former panelist Bill Cullen hosted the show for its brief 1976 CBS summer run. Frequent panelists on this revival were Richard Dawson, Henry Morgan, Pat Carroll, and Elaine Joyce.

The version seen on Oxygen was hosted by Stephanie Miller from January 2000 until August 2001. Regular panelists on this version included Jim J. Bullock, Jason Kravits, Amy Yasbeck, and Teri Garr.

The GSN version was hosted by Bil Dwyer and, unlike the earlier versions, featured a permanent panel that appeared on each episode, consisting of Billy Bean, Frank DeCaro, Jermaine Taylor, and Suzanne Westenhoefer.

== Original series ==
=== Gameplay ===
Each typical episode featured two regular contestant rounds, followed by a celebrity guest round, occasionally followed by an additional regular round.

==== Standard rounds ====
Each round was a guessing game in which the panel tried to determine a contestant's secret. The concept of a secret was fairly broad. Secrets were always intended to be unusual, amazing, embarrassing, or humorous. They commonly included something that happened to the contestant, something owned by the contestant, or a notable occupation, hobby, achievement, or skill.

Each show began with the entrance of one or more contestants. The host then introduced the contestant or asked his or her name and hometown. He then asked them to "whisper your secret to me, and we'll show it to the folks at home." The contestant then ostensibly whispered the secret, while the audience and viewers were shown the secret as a text overlay on the screen. Then the host gave the panel a clue – for example, "the secret concerns something that happened to [contestant's name]." The host then selected a panelist to begin questioning.

When the show debuted, each panelist had 15 seconds of questioning at a time, running through the panel twice, in order. Each segment of questioning which passed without the panelist guessing the secret won the contestant $10, for a top prize of $80. In mid-1954, the format changed to only once around the panel, with a $20 prize for each panelist stumped. The time limit was no longer fixed, and the buzzer which ended questioning was instead at the discretion of the production staff.

This was due, in part, to the program airing live, and sometimes requiring to lengthen or shorten the time allowed for questioning in order to keep the show running on time. Increasingly later in the run, the panelists were sometimes buzzed out when they were getting too close to the secret, were suspected to be about to get it, or simply at a point that would get a laugh. This was precipitated in part by the fact that, like What's My Line?, the top payoff never increased with inflation, and the money eventually became somewhat secondary to the gameplay, with the cash awards not even mentioned at all by the end of the series.

Similarly, the panelist chosen to question first eventually became a strategy by the producers. When a secret fell within an area that a panelist was knowledgeable on, most commonly Cullen with mechanical, scientific or sports secrets, they would often be chosen first, to give them no preceding clues during their questioning. On occasion when a secret referenced a panelist, the order was usually chosen to put them last.

Following the revelation of a guest's secret, either by guessing or by the host's revelation once the game was over, the host typically either interviewed the contestant about their secret, or, if applicable, the contestant did some kind of demonstration of their secret. These demonstrations sometimes included the host, and occasionally one or more of the panelists.

Beyond the standard celebrity guests, several notable people with secrets appeared, including Colonel Harland Sanders ("I started my restaurant with my first Social Security check"), drummer Pete Best ("I used to be one of The Beatles"), and a 95-year-old man, Samuel J. Seymour, who was the last surviving eyewitness to Abraham Lincoln's assassination. He was five years old at the time.

In 1958, an episode devoted to the theme of "teenage appreciation" was the show's answer to media reports of teenage delinquency, and featured nine teenagers of unusual accomplishment, including the then 15-year-old chess champion Bobby Fischer, 16-year-old pop star Paul Anka, and 19-year-old college basketball star Oscar Robertson. Sgt. Ira Jones, who served as Elvis Presley's First Sergeant in Germany, made an appearance. Scientist Philo T. Farnsworth, the inventor of electronic television, made his only televised appearance as a contestant on the show.

==== Guest rounds ====
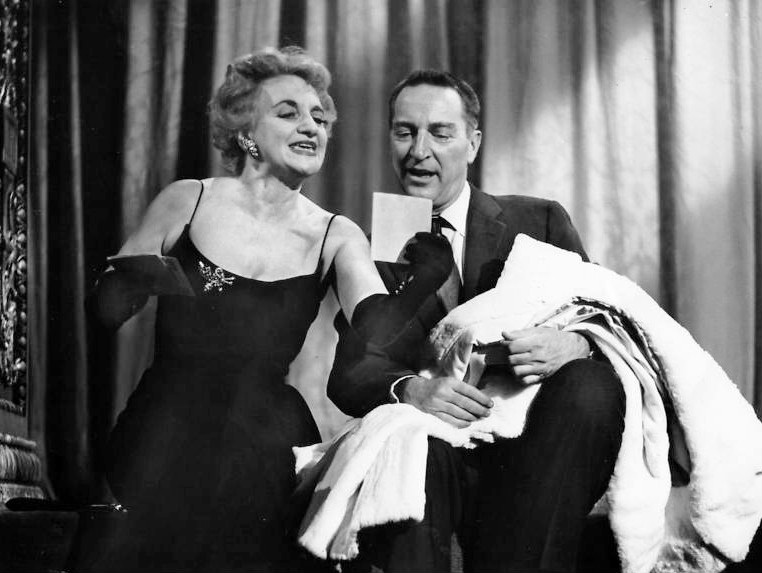
Celebrity guest Hermione Gingold with host Garry Moore

On each typical episode, a celebrity guest came on the show with a secret. The celebrity usually opened the episode by coming out from the behind the curtain and saying "my name is [Name] and I've Got a Secret!", though sometimes they would say "and this is I've Got a Secret!".

Early in the show's run, the celebrities would have actual personal secrets similar to the other contestants. Producer Allan Sherman later admitted that these celebrity "secrets", such as Boris Karloff being afraid of mice, were frequently concocted by the show's staff, and the celebrities merely played along.

The celebrity "secret" was slowly phased out during the mid-1950s, as an increasingly common activity for the celebrity guest was to challenge the panel in some sort of alternate game. Eventually, this became the primary use of the guest segment, and the pretense of having the panel guess the guest's secret was dropped altogether. The guest would simply come out with a challenge for the panel, sometimes ostensibly related to the guest or their current project, but other times not related to the guest at all.

Several of these challenges predated future game shows which used the same concepts, such as a game in which Woody Allen challenged the panel to guess words based on definitions written by children, which became the basis for Child's Play, and a pair of segments with Peter Falk and Soupy Sales in which the panel had to identify celebrities based on a series of photos starting with infancy and progressing older. which featured in the format of the show Face the Music.

Often, secrets would involve Henry Morgan in some manner. Since Morgan had a "lovable sourpuss" personality, he attracted a certain "let's see how we can 'get' Henry this time" playfulness from the writers. Sometimes he would be sent on week-long trips, often starting as soon as the live broadcast ended, which would be filmed and highlights shown the following week.

Some of these trips included being sent to England to buy a proper English Christmas meal from a famous English restaurant, while dressed in a stereotypical English derby and morning coat; spending a week at Roy Rogers' dude ranch as a hired hand; accompanying a mathematician to a Las Vegas casino, to test a new, theoretical method of gambling; and going on an African safari with Ann Sheridan, which started immediately, as Morgan received inoculations and his passport photo on stage.

Henry was also recruited as a background spear holder at the Metropolitan Opera, a dead body in a murder-mystery Broadway play, a Santa Claus for disadvantaged kids, and a radio announcer who bravely read his script while the other panelists distracted him mercilessly. A Halloween episode had Arnold Stang taking the stage in a traditional "bedsheet" ghost costume with the secret "This costume was made from Henry Morgan's bedsheet." After the game Moore said "Don't worry, Henry, we promise to put these back where we found them," at which point the center stage curtain rose to reveal Morgan's own bed.

=== Notable guests on the show ===
I've Got a Secret was host to many notable guests over the course of the show's run.

Name	Episode date	Secret	Ref.
Buster Keaton	25 July 1952	I threw a pie at Hedda Hopper.	
Harpo Marx	21 April 1954	I'm pretending to be Harpo Marx (I'm Chico).	
Boris Karloff	13 October 1954	I am afraid of mice.	
Cy Young	13 April 1955	Member of the Baseball Hall of Fame.	
Emmett Kelly	19 April 1955	Famous clown with acrobat on the eve of their wedding.	
Ronald Reagan	15 October 1955	None. Whenever a panelist flubs a line the game starts again from the beginning.	
Samuel J. Seymour	8 February 1956	I saw John Wilkes Booth shoot Abraham Lincoln.	
Clyde Tombaugh	24 October 1956	I discovered the planet Pluto.	
Philo Farnsworth	3 July 1957	I invented electronic television when I was 14 years old. (Farnsworth's only notable television appearance)	
Bobby Fischer	26 March 1958	At age 15 I became the United States chess champion.	
Ira Jones	6 May 1959	I was Elvis Presley's platoon sergeant.	
John Cage	24 February 1960	I consider music the production of sounds.	
Delia and Bertie Harris	26 April 1961	Our grandfather was a soldier in the American Revolutionary War.	
Viola and Stephen Armstrong	17 September 1962	Our son became an astronaut today.	
John Cale	16 September 1963	I performed in a concert that lasted 18 hours. (Cale later co-founded The Velvet Underground).	
Colonel Sanders	6 April 1964	I started KFC with my Social Security check of $105.00	
Pete Best	30 March 1964	I left my job two years ago—I was one of The Beatles.	
Cole Palen	26 April 1965	I flew here in a 1912 airplane.	
Denise Austin, Lynn Austin, Jacque Fitch	18 October 1965	Fitch's great-grandmother is at home watching them on TV; the great-grandmothers of the other two are backstage.	
William Pollock	6 June 1966	I'm driving the oldest automobile still operating in the United States; nothing on it has been replaced since it was built in 1891.	
Bob McGrath	20 February 1967	My recordings of Irish Songs are best sellers...but only in Japan.	

=== History and style ===
I've Got a Secret was more informal than sister show What's My Line? in most respects. The panel and host were generally on a first-name basis. As noted, the formal time limit on questioning was removed early in the show's run, and time limits were set more for entertainment. The men on the panel always wore normal suits or even sport jackets, though both Morgan and Moore often chose bow ties over straight ties. Until the later years of the series, both Moore and members of the panel smoked cigarettes on the air, with Moore doing so right up until his last episode. The panel was introduced at the start of each episode by the host, usually with a series of descriptive puns.

Only yes-or-no questions were supposed to be asked by the panel, but the format was often relaxed, and other questions slipped through. Unlike on What's My Line?, the host often offered hints and suggestions when the panel was off in the wrong direction, or when an answer might be misleading. Unlike on What's My Line?, the panelists were not allowed to formally confer with each other, though later in the series, there was no chastising of the panelists for whispering ideas to each other.

The series began in black-and-white, and only in 1966 switched regularly to color, though like most programs of this era, existing recordings are in black and white. The series was sponsored for most of its run, with the opening of the show featuring a promotion for whichever company was the sponsor, signage on the set, and commercials being included during the show. Some sponsors provided samples of their wares for each contestant, in addition to their winnings. Late in the series' run, sponsorship was discontinued.

I've Got a Secret was, along with What's My Line? and To Tell the Truth, canceled in a mass axing of CBS's remaining panel shows in 1967. The shows were financially successful but were not drawing good ratings, especially among the key demographics. Of the three, I've Got a Secret was the only one not to continue uninterrupted in some other form, and unlike its siblings, the show was unable to succeed through the growing television viewership of the 1970's. What's My Line? moved to syndication and continued until 1975, and To Tell the Truth continued as a daytime series, with it ending in 1978. Then-host Steve Allen would return to his syndicated talk show the next year.

The series itself had a cameo in the 1959 film It Happened to Jane, in which the title character appears as a contestant on the show. Moore and the entire panel played themselves in the fictional episode of the show.

In January 1960, as a result of Goodson-Todman's sale, the show became a production of Telecast Enterprises, Inc., which was co-owned by CBS and Moore, although Goodson-Todman continued to supply the production team and talent. Eventually, after the show's cancellation, the show was bought back by Goodson-Todman.

In 1992, Carsey-Werner, who bought the rights from the show from Mark Goodson Productions, attempted to revive the show for the fall of 1993 and quite possibly pair it up with the Bill Cosby revival of You Bet Your Life in syndication. However, plans for it fell through at the last minute. Thus, it never made it to air. Also, this was the only version of the show never to have announced a permanent host or its four panelists for the show at all.

In March 2023, it was announced that Embassy Row, Werner Entertainment and Game Show Enterprises Studios would be producing an hour-long pilot for a potential revival, with Katie Nolan as host. The panelists for the pilot include Nikki Glaser, Colton Dunn, Cristela Alonzo and Matteo Lane.

=== Merchandise ===
A home game of I've Got a Secret, featuring host Garry Moore on the cover of the box, was released in 1956 by the Lowell Toy Manufacturing Corporation of New York City.

== Changes in the revivals ==
=== 1970s revivals ===
The large logo on the set in 1972

The neon logo used on the 1976 revival

The format of the 1970s revivals were essentially unchanged from the original series. Celebrity secrets returned, rather than challenges to the panel, whose members changed weekly. Richard Dawson served as a regular panelist on both versions in the 1970s, with actress Pat Carroll making frequent panel appearances, and Henry Morgan appeared as a panelist a few times.

Former panelists Steve Allen hosted the syndicated version from 1972 until 1973. Bill Cullen hosted the CBS version in 1976. Both revivals were unable to become popular, unlike the other two CBS panel shows that were revived.

=== Oxygen revival ===
On the Oxygen revival, panelists had 45 seconds each for the questioning. The contestant earned $250 for each stumped panelist, and stumping the entire panel earned a total of $1,000 for the challenger. Stephanie Miller hosted this version and the show's set resembled an upscale city apartment. The Oxygen revival ran for over 120 episodes. Steve Allen, in one of his last major appearances before his passing, and Betsy Palmer both made special guest appearances on one episode.

=== GSN revival ===
On GSN's revival, each panelist had 40 seconds for questioning, with one conference allowed. Stumping the entire panel won the contestant $1,000 and dinner for two in Beverly Hills. The disclaimer at the end of the program disclosed that contestants were also paid an appearance fee. Losing contestants also received some unspecified parting gifts. Several minor show business professionals demonstrated their performances on the show, including piano juggler Dan Menendez. Another element in the revival was that all the panelists were openly gay, but this was generally only referenced in double entendres, such as when host Bil Dwyer was introduced as "the straight man to the panel".

== Episode status ==
As with What's My Line?, some early episodes from the original series' first season in 1952 appear to have been lost. From late 1952 until the 1967 cancellation, most episodes appear to exist as a digital transfer of the original black-and-white kinescope films. The premiere episode, which featured a drastically different set-up, is presumed to be lost.

=== GSN ===
A good portion of the series is unlikely to be aired, due to the show's longtime sponsorship by Winston cigarettes, which remains an existing brand, and that cigarette advertisements on radio and television have been banned since January 1971. The prize on the 1956 episode about Samuel J. Seymour, who witnessed the assassination of Abraham Lincoln, included $80 (equivalent to $947 in 2025) and a carton of Winston cigarettes. Seymour did not smoke cigarettes, so he was given Prince Albert pipe tobacco instead.

It is unclear whether this is mandated legally, or simply a choice by GSN; GSN had aired many Winston-sponsored episodes in previous years. The network skipped several episodes through its run which are known to have been skipped in previous runs of the show. This may mean that other episodes are lost or in bad enough condition for GSN not to air them.

All subsequent revivals of Secret exist in their entirety, except for the 1976 run, whose status is currently unknown, though the pilot episode (that also aired as the premiere) for that version is currently available for viewing on YouTube. The finale is also available in audio. GSN has occasionally aired single episodes from the 1972–73 syndicated version.

=== Buzzr ===
The over-the-air digital channel Buzzr, owned by Fremantle, has aired the program in a two-hour block, with To Tell the Truth and What's My Line?. Each episode airs uncut, including the original commercials (excluding the cigarette commercials), in a 40-minute slot.

== Nielsen ratings ==
Between 1952 and 1967, I've Got a Secret ranked among the top 30 television shows for ten out of fifteen seasons, peaking at #5 during the 1957–58 season.

== Theme music ==
The first theme used on the show from 1952 to 1961 was "Plink, Plank, Plunk!", by Leroy Anderson. This theme can be heard on the album Classic TV Game Show Themes. The theme on the CD was credited to Norman Paris.

The second theme, used from 1961 to 1963, was an upbeat arrangement of the "Theme from A Summer Place", by Max Steiner.

The third theme was used from 1963 to 1967. It was an upbeat, spritely march featuring piccolo and xylophone, composed by the show's musical director Norman Paris and played by a live studio combo. It quoted a familiar melody widely associated with schoolyard taunts, to which the words "I've got a secret!" might be sung by children in a teasing manner.

In addition to being used as a tag for his entrance on CBS episodes he hosted, Steve Allen's composition "This Could Be the Start of Something" was used as the opening theme in 1972 arranged by Edd Kalehoff for Score Productions. The closing theme to the 1972 version was also written by Kalehoff.

Tim Mosher and Stoker are credited with the 2000 theme, while Alan Ett and Scott Liggett contributed an up jazz theme for Bil Dwyer's 2006 version of the show for GSN.

== International versions ==
Country	Name	Host	Channel	Air dates
Australia	I've Got a Secret	Eric Pearce	HSV 7	1956–1958
Australia	I've Got a Secret	Don Seccombe	QTQ Channel 9	1967–1973
France	J'ai un Secret	Pierre Bellemare	TF1	1982–1983
Japan	My Secret	Keizo Takahashi	NHK	1955–1967
United Kingdom	I've Got a Secret	Ben Lyon	ITV	1956
United Kingdom	I've Got a Secret	Tom O'Connor	BBC1	1984–1988

An Australian version of the show was produced and aired in Brisbane on QTQ Channel 9 from 1967 to 1973. It was hosted by newsreader Don Seccombe. Like its American inspiration, featured regular celebrity panelists including Ron Cadee, Babette Stevens and Joy Chambers, future wife of Australian game show impresario Reg Grundy.

A different Australian version aired in Melbourne in 1956, with Eric Pearce as host. It debuted during the first week of television programming in that city and opening night for television station HSV 7 (November 4) with American actress, Jean Moorhead, as a guest panellist. During its run, it featured regular panelists such as Olive Wykes, Shirley Cecil, John Frith, Freddie Bowler and Jack Dyer. It is not clear when that particular version ended, but it was still running in 1958. It is not known if any kinescopes exist of this version.

A Japanese version aired on NHK from 1955 to 1967 called My Secret, hosted by Keizo Takahashi.

French network TF1 aired J'ai un Secret between 1982 and 1983, hosted by Pierre Bellemare.

Two versions were produced in the United Kingdom. The first was produced by Associated-Rediffusion and aired on ITV in 1956. This version was hosted by American-born Ben Lyon. The second version aired on BBC1 from 1984 to 1988, hosted by Tom O'Connor.
