= Joseph Hazelton =

American actor (1853–1936)

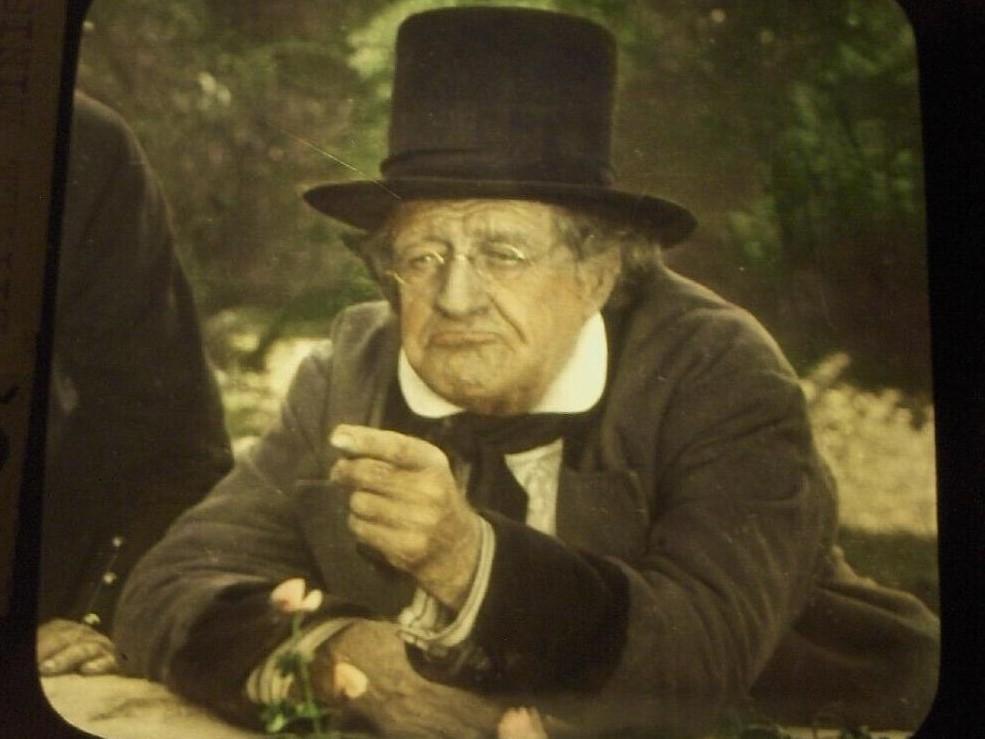
- Hazelton as John Spens, The Little Minister 1921
- Born: Joseph H. Hazelton c. 1853; Wilmington, New York, U.S.
- Died: October 6, 1936 (aged 82–83); Los Angeles, California, U.S.
- Other name: Joe Hazelton
- Occupation: Actor

Joseph H. Hazelton (c. 1853 – October 6, 1936) was an American stage and film actor. He appeared in 30 films between 1912 and 1922. He claimed to have witnessed the assassination of U.S. President Abraham Lincoln on April 14, 1865, as a boy.

== Life and career ==
Hazelton debuted on stage as a child when a production at Grover's Theater (now the National Theatre) in Washington, D.C. needed a boy to play a young prince in King John. Thereafter, he continued to stay around the theater, doing odd jobs and handing out programs. In 1910, he was a member of the Columbia Players in Washington, D.C.

In 1930, the Pasadena Community Playhouse presented Our American Cousin, the play Lincoln was watching when shot. Hazelton spoke during the intermission of each performance, relating what he witnessed as he observed the assassination. In 1933, Hazelton gave a lecture at May Company Exposition Hall in Los Angeles and talked about watching Booth shoot Lincoln. An article in Good Housekeeping in its February 1927 edition, titled "This Man Saw Lincoln Shot," was the basis for a leaflet that Hazelton released to raise funds later in his life.

In addition to claiming in his 70’s that he was a child witness to the Lincoln Assassination, Hazelton also made some dubious claims about the assassin. For example, Hazelton maintained that John Wilkes Booth broke small bones in his ankle but did not break his leg. This account contradicts Booth’s diary and the consensus of historians. Hazelton also claimed that Booth was not killed by Union soldier Boston Corbett in a barn in Northern Virginia on April 26, 1865. Instead, Hazelton insisted Booth escaped to South America, returned to the United States under the name “St. Helen,” and committed suicide in Enid, Oklahoma, in 1903.

On Broadway, Hazelton performed in Skipper & Co., Wall Street (1903).

Hazelton died in Los Angeles, California on October 6, 1936.

== Selected filmography ==
- The Heart of Maryland (1915)
- The Blood of His Fathers (1917)
- Please Get Married (1919)
- A White Man's Chance (1919)
- Nurse Marjorie (1920)
- Homer Comes Home (1920)
- The Jailbird (1920)
- Pinto (1920)
- False Kisses (1921)
- The Little Minister (1921)(*Betty Compson version)
- In the Days of Buffalo Bill (1922)
- Oliver Twist (1922)
- He Who Gets Slapped (1924)

== See also ==
- Samuel J. Seymour, who claimed at age 95 on a TV game show to be a child eyewitness of the assassination
- T. D. Bancroft
