= USS PC-823 =

PC-461-class submarine chaser

Coordinates: 35.1258338°N 128.6620263°E

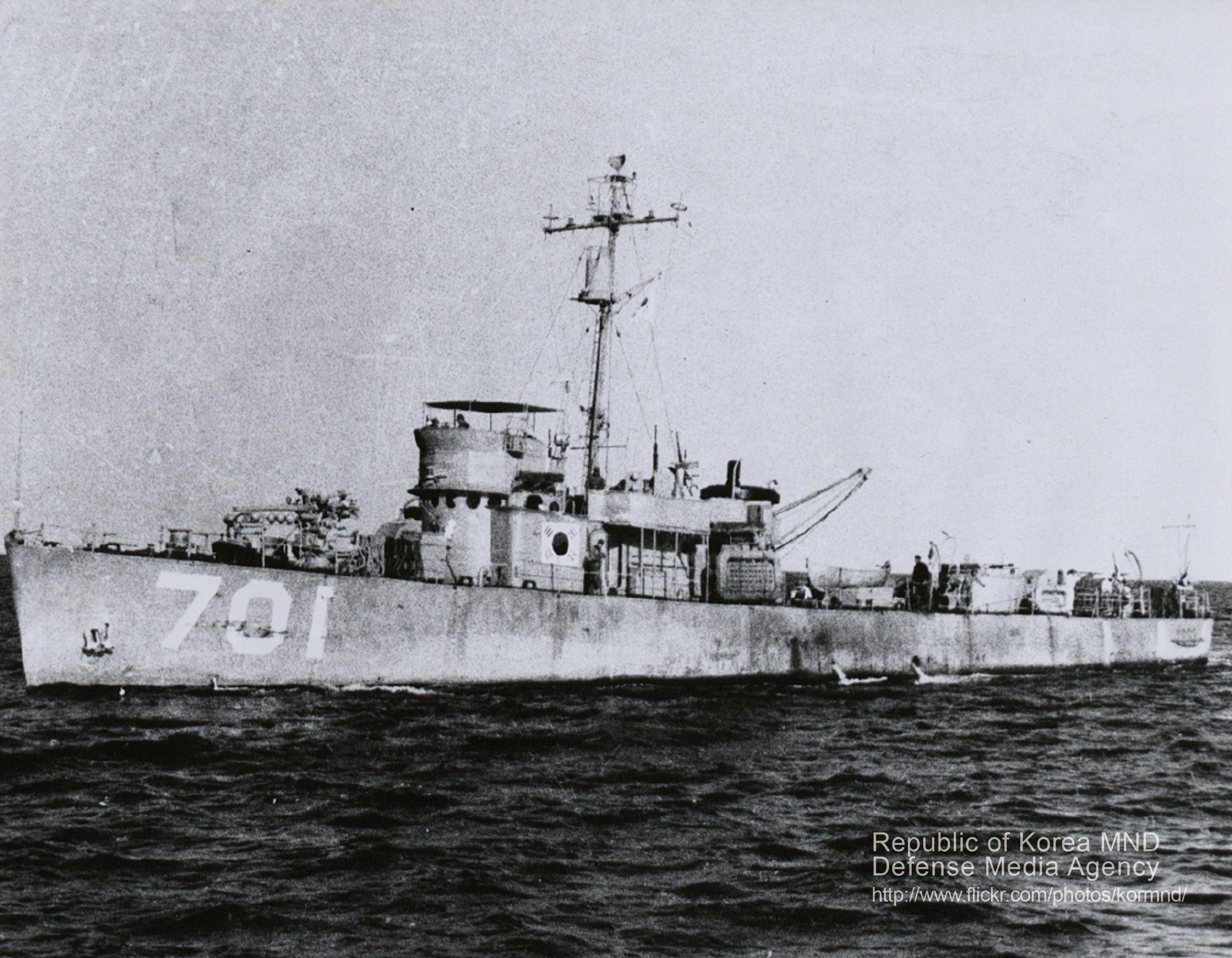
- ROKS Baekdusan with the Taegukgi painted on the side of the ship's wheelhouse in the 1950s

History

United States
- Name: PC-823
- Builder: Leathem D. Smith Shipbuilding Company
- Laid down: 8 November 1943
- Launched: 15 January 1944
- Commissioned: 24 July 1944
- Decommissioned: 11 February 1946
- Stricken: Transferred to United States Merchant Marine Academy, June 1948
- Renamed: Ensign Whitehead
- Fate: Transferred to South Korea, September 1949

South Korea
- Name: Baekdusan
- Namesake: Baekdu Mountain
- Acquired: 17 October 1949
- Commissioned: 26 December 1949
- Decommissioned: 21 August 1960
- Identification: Hull number: PC-701
- Fate: Scrapped
- Notes: Mast preserved at Republic of Korea Navy Academy

General characteristics
- Class & type: PC-461
- Displacement: 280 tons
- Length: 173 ft 8 in (52.93 m)
- Beam: 23 ft 0 in (7.01 m)
- Draft: 10 ft 10 in (3.30 m)
- Speed: 20 knots
- Complement: 65
- Armament: 1 × 3 in (76 mm)/50 cal; 6 × .50 caliber machine guns; 4 × depth charge throwers; 2 × depth charge tracks; 2 x depth charge projector (Mousetrap).

USS PC-823 was a PC-461-class submarine chaser built for the United States Navy during World War II. After the end of the war, the vessel was used as a training ship by the United States Merchant Marine Academy until 1949.

In September 1949, she was transferred to the Republic of Korea Navy and renamed ROKS Baekdusan, (PC-701), and played a major part in the Battle of Korea Strait, the first major naval engagement fought by the ROKN. The remains of her mast are kept in the Republic of Korea Naval Academy.

== Service with the United States ==
PC-823 was laid down on 2 June 1943 at the Leathem D. Smith Shipbuilding Company in Sturgeon Bay, Wisconsin, and was launched on 15 January 1944; being commissioned on 24 July 1944.

PC-823 served in the western Atlantic Ocean during World War II, being assigned to air-sea rescue duties during at least some of that time. On 11 February 1946, PC-823 was decommissioned and transferred to the United States Maritime Commission. She was handed over to the United States Merchant Marine Academy at Kings Point, New York on 18 May 1948, and renamed Ensign Whitehead as a training ship. The ship was struck from the Navy List in June 1948.

== Acquisition by South Korea ==
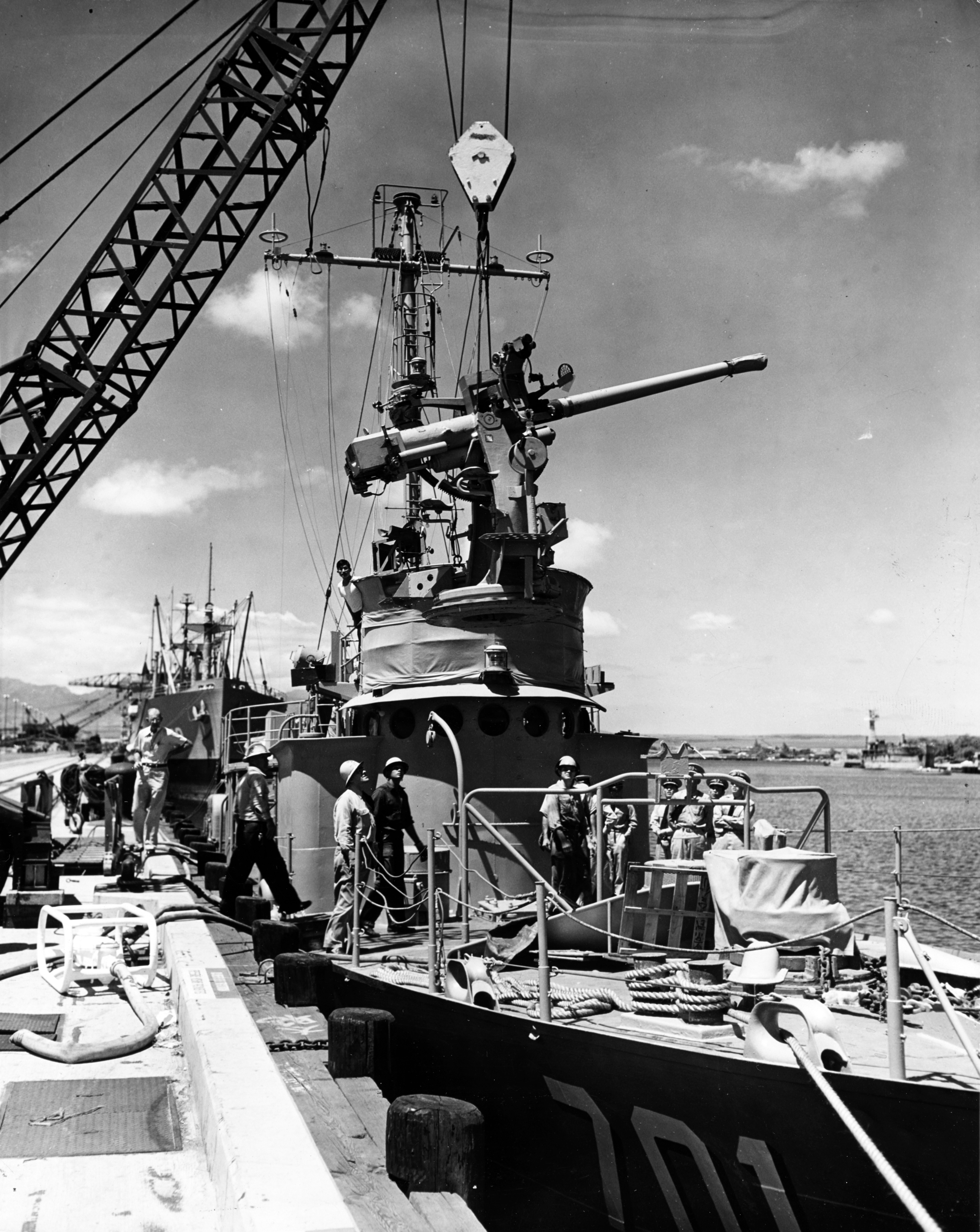
Baekdusan being refitted at Pearl Harbor on 17 March 1950

Upon its establishment on 11 November 1945, the Republic of Korea Navy (ROKN) was woefully under-funded and under-equipped. At the outbreak of the war in June 1950, the navy consisted of the Baekdusan, other ex-US ships, and some left over vessels captured from Japan. The ROKN's first Chief of Naval Operations, Admiral Sohn Won-yil, emphasized the necessity of acquiring a new naval vessel. However, as the South Korean government could not provide either the natural resources or economic means available to purchase new ships, the ROKN decided on an independent purchase of a new vessel and organized the "Vessel Construction Finance Committee"(함정건조 각출위원회) in June 1949. From top officers to cadets, ROKN servicemen invested 5%~10% of their salaries to fund the purchase, with some midshipmen and their wives selling scrap metal and taking in laundry and sewing. After four months, the ROKN managed to raise $15,000. The South Korean government provided an additional $45,000 upon hearing of the ROKN's efforts, summing for a total of $60,000.

On 17 October 1949, South Korea acquired the Ensign Whitehead (the former USS PC-823), then a training ship of the United States Merchant Marine Academy. Upon its purchase, the ship was initially in such a poor condition that it had to go through two months of repairs by fifteen naval officers. On 26 December 1949 in New York, the Ensign Whitehead was rechristened as the ROKS Baekdusan (PC-701), the ROKN's first ocean-going vessel. Sailing from New York, a 3-inch main deck gun was attached at the Pearl Harbor Naval Shipyard, and 100 shells were purchased at Guam. Baekdusan finally arrived at Jinhae Naval Base, South Korea, on 10 April 1950, barely two months before the outbreak of the Korean War in June 1950.

== Deployment ==
Before dawn on 25 June 1950, the Baekdusan's crew sighted an unidentified ship around 18 nautical miles from the key port of Busan during a routine patrol. After initially attempting to establish contact with the unknown vessel using signal lights, the crew switched on the ship's main searchlights, revealing a nearly 1,000-ton North Korean freighter against the darkness. Onboard were an estimated 600 elite commandos belonging to the 766th Independent Infantry Regiment with the intent of seizing Busan. In response, the enemy soldiers fired at the Baekdusan's bridge using machine guns, killing two and wounding four others, including the officer of the deck. The freighter then frantically began to flee north.

In response to the attack, the Baekdusan immediately began to pursue after the North Korean vessel, firing multiple rounds from its main 3-inch anti aircraft gun and the six .50-caliber machine guns onboard. According to numerous reports from veterans of the Baekdusan, several North Korean commandos attempted to swim aboard the ship, causing the crew to engage them with their M1 Garand rifles. After four hours of relentless pursuit by the South Koreans, the freighter finally sank near Tsushima Island, bringing an end to the battle.

Except for the fortuitous position of the PC-701 and the fighting qualities of the craft's crew, the North Korean soldiers might have successfully landed at the vital port of Busan. The poor state of combat readiness at the port could easily have led to its loss. In such an event, not even the small toehold of Busan would have remained to support the U.N. counteroffensive in Korea. This single naval action may well have prevented the fall of South Korea.

== Fate ==
After the Battle of Korea Strait, the ROKS Baekdusan went on to see combat in various other battles in the Korean War. In September 1950, she participated in the Inchon landing, which was the beginning of the war's turning point.

Following the signing of the Korean Armistice Agreement in 1953, the ROKS Baekdusan was decommissioned on 1 July 1959 and was subsequently dismantled. Her mast is now preserved on the campus of the Republic of Korea Naval Academy in Jinhae, close to where she first arrived at South Korea from Pearl Harbor on 10 April 1950.

== Gallery ==
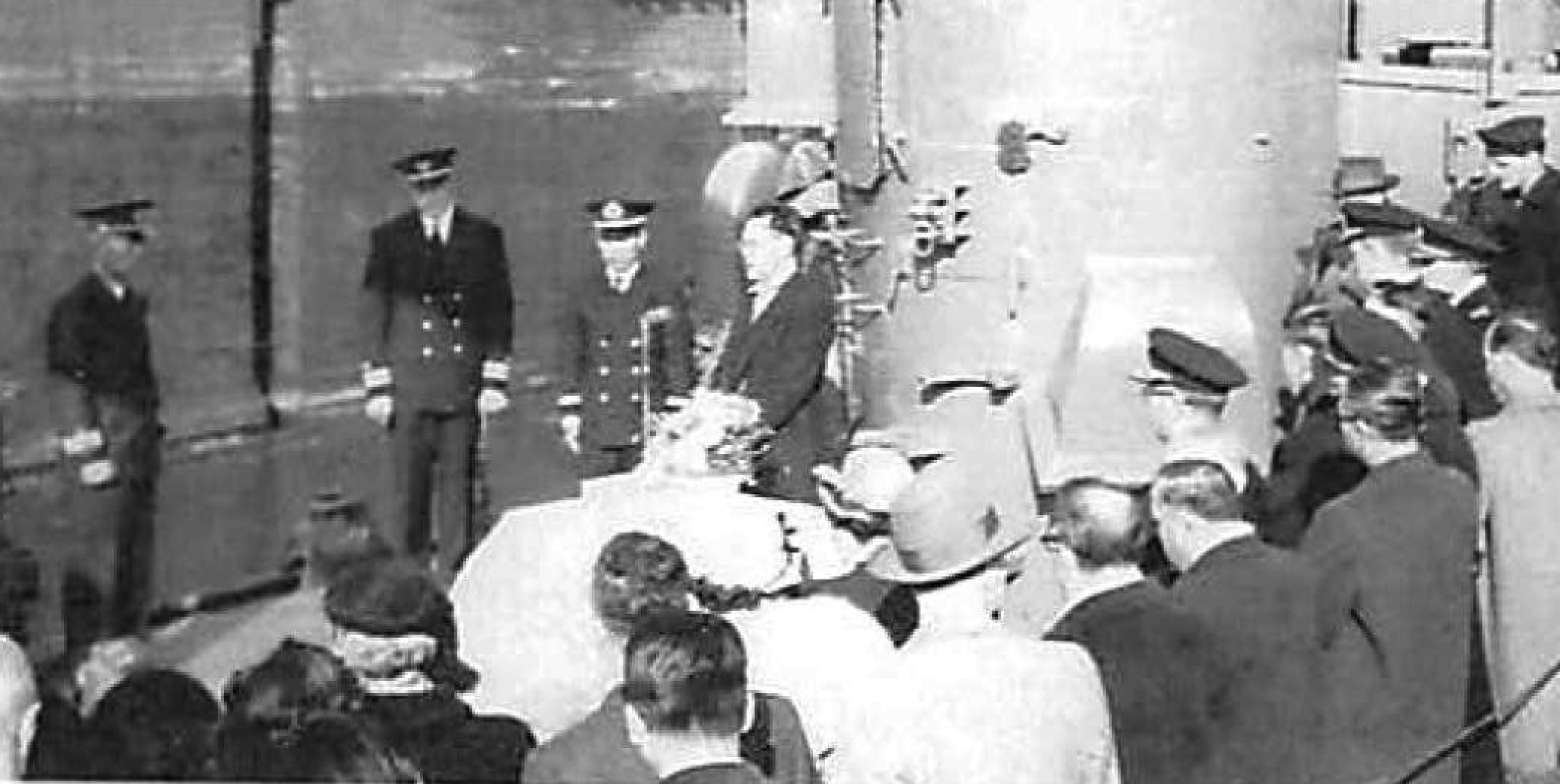
A Protestant minister delivers blessings on the newly-christened Baekdusan.

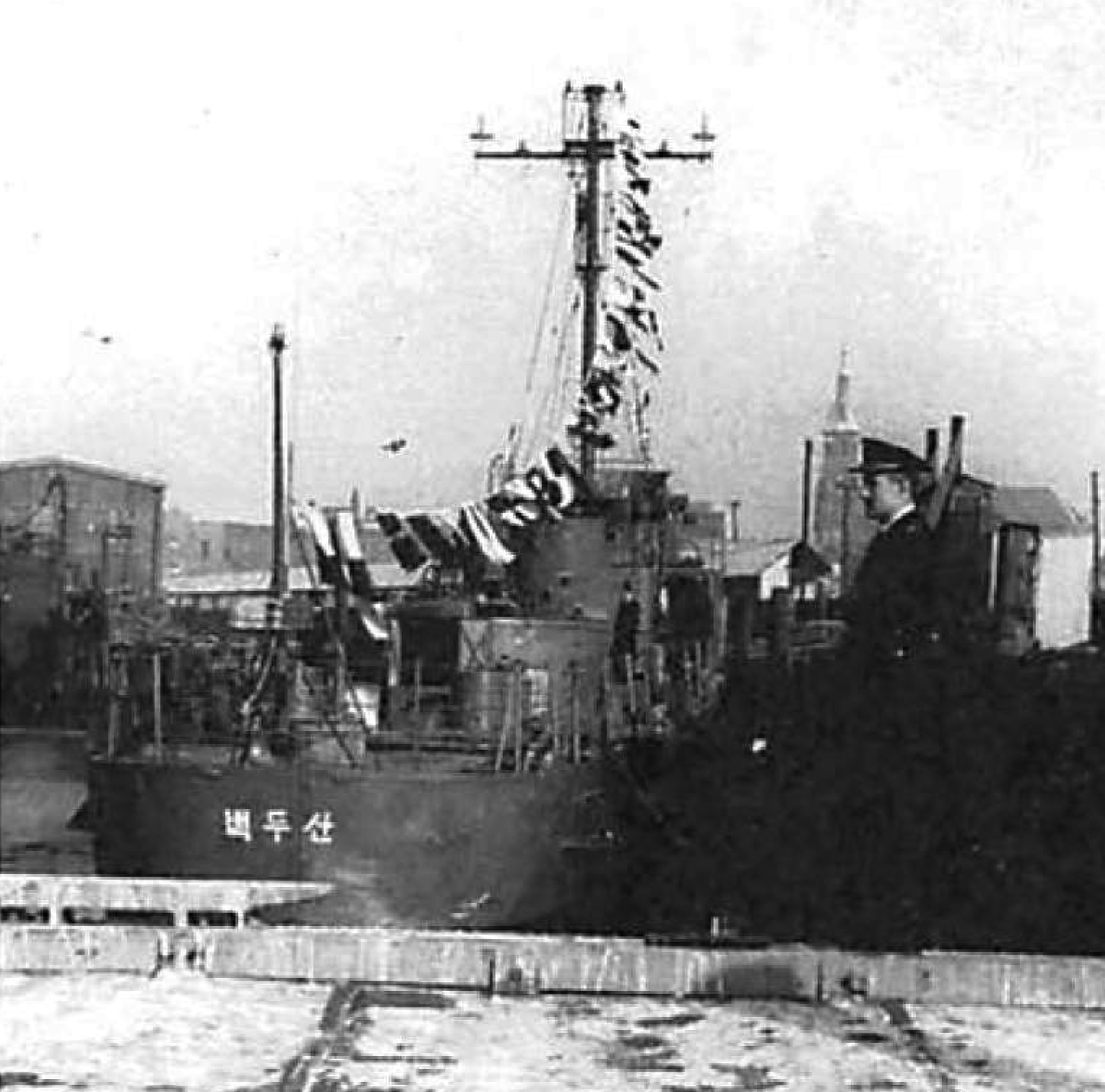
Fantail of the Baekdusan the day the ship transferred from the USN to the ROKN in 1949.

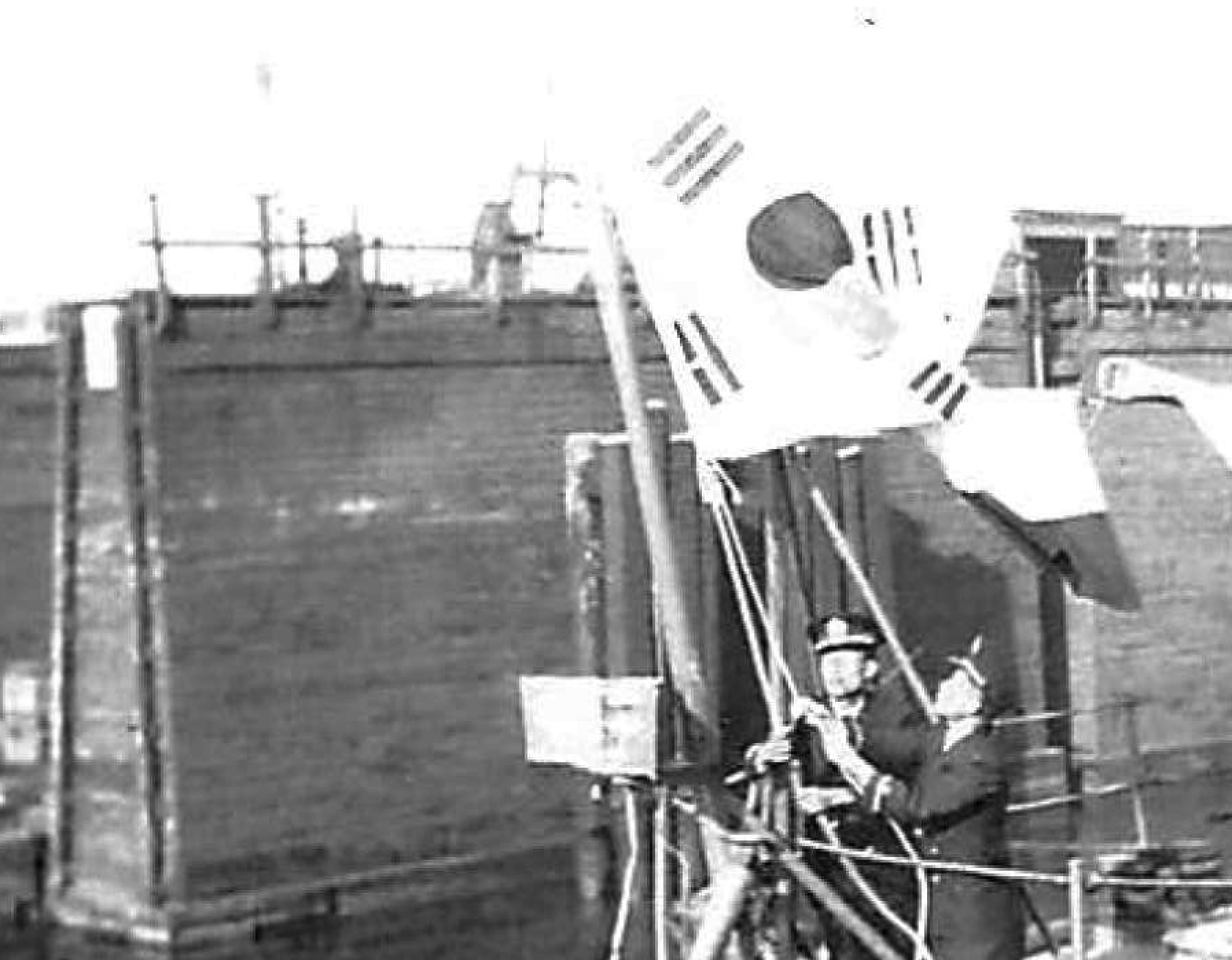
Korean naval officers raising the Taegukgi aboard the Baekdusan at the Brooklyn Navy Yard, 1949
