= Poos =

Poos is a surname. Notable people with the surname include:

- Christian Poos (born 1977), Luxembourgian cyclist
- Jacques Poos (1935–2022), Luxembourgian politician
- Omer Poos (1902–1976), American federal judge

== See also ==
- Poo (disambiguation)
