= Sans =

Sans or SANS is an English preposition taken from French "without." It may also refer to:

== Arts and entertainment ==
=== Fictional characters ===
- Sans (Undertale), a video game character
- Sans (Deltarune), a video game character
- The Sans, also called as the Saan, mascots of the 2025 SEA Games

=== Music ===
- Şans, a 2009 album by Murat Boz
- "sans.", a 2015 song by Toby Fox from Undertale Soundtrack
- Sans, a 2018 album by Keller Williams

== Science and technology ==
- Sans-serif, or sans, a typeface feature
  - Comic Sans, a sans-serif typeface by Microsoft
- SANS device (Stoller Afferent Nerve Stimulator), a medical instrument
- Small-angle neutron scattering, a method of studying polymers and colloids
- Spaceflight-associated neuro-ocular syndrome, a disease observed in long-term spaceflight

== People ==
- San people, an indigenous people of Southern Africa

=== Persons ===
- Agustí Sans (born 1995), Spanish basketball player
- Alain Sans (born 1945), French middle-distance runner
- Carles Sans (born 1975), Spanish water polo player
- Daniel Sans (born 1975), German tenor
- Jérôme Sans (born 1960), French art critic and curator
- Jordi Sans (born 1965), Spanish water polo player
- Juan Sans (born 1952), Spanish water polo player
- Judith Sans (born 1994), Spanish handball player
- Macarena Sans (born 1996), Argentine handball player
- Matthieu Sans (born 1988), French footballer
- Pau Sans (born 2004), Spanish footballer
- Romain Sans (born 1999), French footballer

== Places ==
- SANS Institute (SysAdmin, Audit, Network and Security), an American internet security training company
- Sag Harbor Hills, Azurest, and Ninevah Beach Subdivisions Historic District, in Sag Harbor, New York, US

== See also ==
- SAN (disambiguation)
- Sans Souci (disambiguation)
- Saans, a 1998 Indian TV series
- "Saans", a song by A. R. Rahman, Shreya Ghoshal and Mohit Chauhan from the 2012 Indian film Jab Tak Hai Jaan
- Saansein, 2016 Indian film by Rajiv S Ruia
