= Battle of Pusan =

Battle of Pusan may refer to:

- Battle of Pusan (1592)
- Siege of Pusan (1592)
- Battle of Pusan (1597)
- Battle of Pusan Perimeter (1950) a land siege battle of the Korean War
- Battle of Korea Strait (Battle of Pusan Strait; 1950) a naval battle of the Korean War
