= Poopó =

Poopó may refer to:

- Lake Poopó, Oruro, Bolivia
- Poopó Province, Oruro, Bolivia
- Poopó Municipality, Oruro, Bolivia

== See also ==
- Poo poo (disambiguation)
