= Pinto (film) =

1920 film directed by Victor Schertzinger

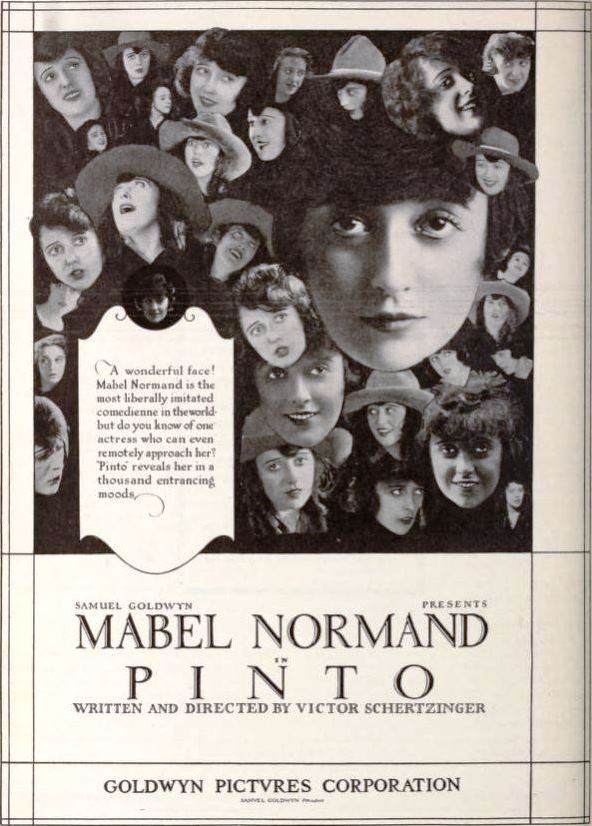
- Directed by: Victor Schertzinger
- Written by: George C. Duffy; Victor Schertzinger
- Produced by: Samuel Goldwyn
- Starring: Mabel Normand; Cullen Landis; Edward Jobson
- Cinematography: George Webber
- Production company: Goldwyn Pictures
- Distributed by: Goldwyn Distributing
- Release date: January 1920
- Running time: 50 minutes
- Country: United States
- Languages: Silent; English intertitles

Pinto is a 1920 American silent Western comedy film directed by Victor Schertzinger and starring Mabel Normand, Cullen Landis, and Edward Jobson.

== Plot ==
When Pinto reaches her eighteenth birthday, the five wealthy Arizonans who adopted her upon the death of her parents decide that ranch life will never make a lady of her. Their old friend Pop Audry, formerly of Arizona and now a member of New York society, agrees to provide Pinto with the necessary education. Accordingly, Pinto and her cowboy nursemaid Looey are dispatched to New York where they lose Audry's address. They are aided in locating the estate by Bob De Witt, a young neighbor. Audry's haughty wife objects to the cowgirl's presence and moves out of the house. Soon Pinto discovers that her detractor is carrying on an affair with another man and informs Pop Audry of his wife's deception during a Wild West show that Pinto has staged for Pop's friends. Pop decides to deed the house to his fortune-hunting wife and returns to Arizona with Pinto, who, still a cowgirl, is accompanied by Bob De Witt.

== Cast ==
- Mabel Normand as Pinto
- Cullen Landis as Bob DeWitt
- Edward Jobson as Looey
- Edythe Chapman as Mrs. Audry
- George Nichols as Pop Audrey
- William Elmer as Lousy
- Hallam Cooley as Armand Cassel
- Andrew Arbuckle as Guardian
- Richard Cummings as Guardian
- George Kunkel as Guardian
- John Burton as Guardian
- Joseph Hazelton as Guardian
- Manuel R. Ojeda as Mexican
- T.D. Crittenden as Guardian

== Bibliography ==
- James Robert Parish & Michael R. Pitts. Film directors: a guide to their American films. Scarecrow Press, 1974.
