= Poo (surname) =

Poo a surname. Notable people with the surname include:

- Ai-jen Poo (born 1974), American labor activist
- Fernão do Pó, 15th-century Portuguese navigator and explorer also known as Fernando Poo
- Karin Sham Poo (born 1943), Norwegian banker and diplomat
- Mu-ming Poo (born 1948), American neuroscientist
- Murdaya Poo (1946–2025), Indonesian businessman and politician
- Sam Poo (died 1865), Chinese bushranger in Australia, hanged for murder
