= T. D. Bancroft =

American temperance movement activist (1837–1917)

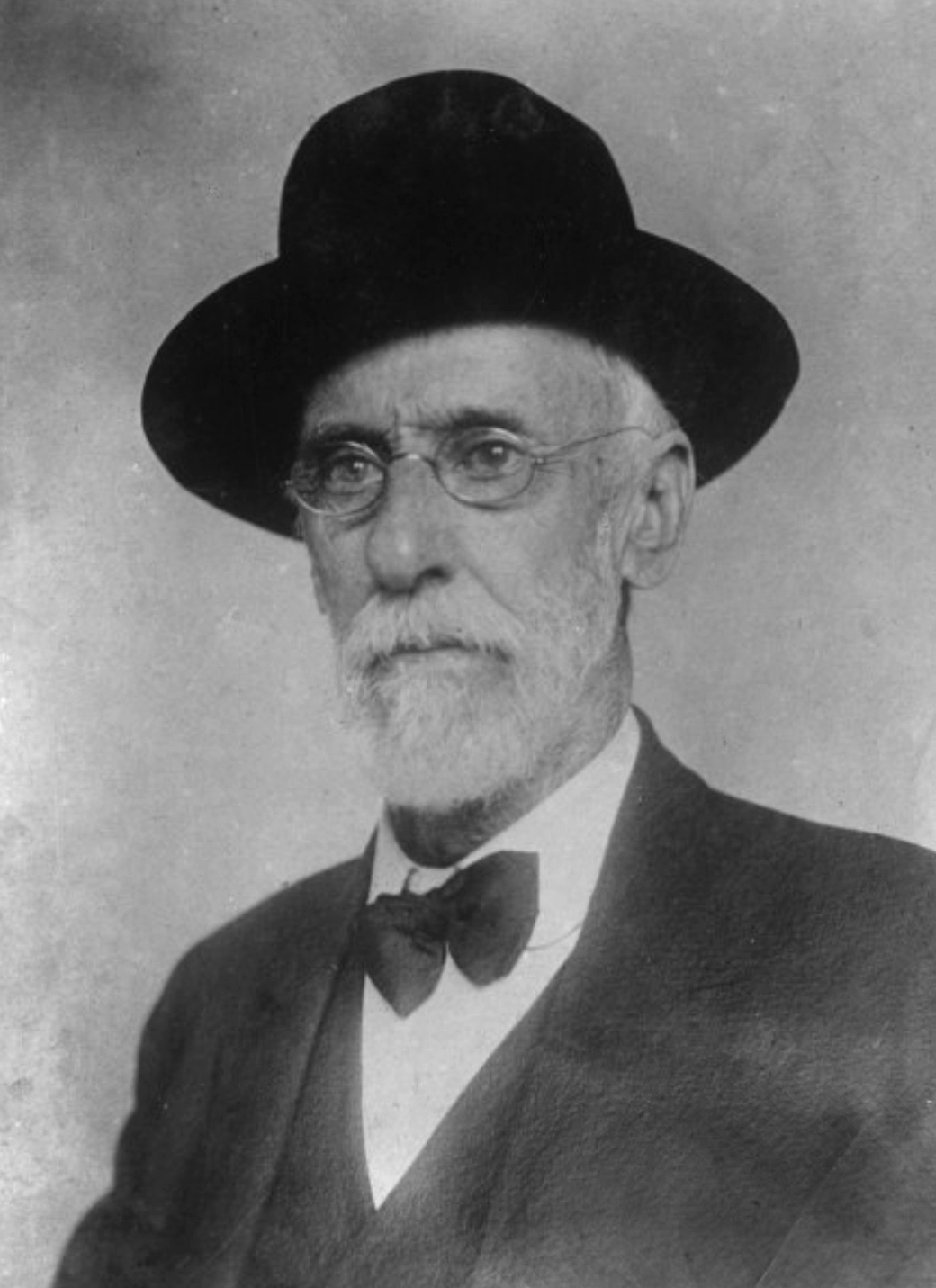
- Bancroft c. 1900

Personal details
- Born: Thomas David Bancroft; August 12, 1837 Elyria, Ohio, U.S.
- Died: November 23, 1917 (aged 80) Providence, Rhode Island, U.S.
- Cause of death: Accidental gas poisoning
- Resting place: Avon, New York, U.S.
- Spouse(s): Susie Archer; Elida Smith

Military service
- Branch/service: Jayhawker; Union Army
- Battles/wars: Bleeding Kansas; American Civil War

Thomas David Bancroft (August 12, 1837 – November 23, 1917) was an American temperance movement activist, writer, and public speaker. An eyewitness to the assassination of Abraham Lincoln, he toured the United States giving lectures about Abraham Lincoln.

Born in Elyria, Ohio, Bancroft was raised in New York before moving to the Kansas Territory at age 18. He was a Jayhawker during Bleeding Kansas and fought to prevent Kansas from becoming a slave state. After the war, he returned to New York in 1860 to attend college and became involved in the campaign to elect Abraham Lincoln as president. In the American Civil War he served in a group of Kansas militia men assigned to protect Washington D.C. and then in the Union Army under General Philip Sheridan.

Bancroft later achieved national prominence for his lecture tours on Lincoln's death. In Kansas City, Kansas, he founded a Christian school, created several public libraries across Kansas, and established the first public library in Hot Springs, Arkansas. An activist in the temperance movement, he worked for the Anti-Saloon League nationally. He lived his later life in Los Angeles County, California, before dying in Providence, Rhode Island, during a lecture tour.

== Early life and Bleeding Kansas ==
The son of David Bancroft and his wife Louisa Bancroft (née Thomas), T. D. Bancroft was born in Elyria, Ohio, on August 12, 1837. His father was a mason who worked on the initial building of Oberlin College. His parents were originally from the state of New York, and moved back when Bancrott was two years old. At the age of 18, he moved to Kansas Territory; traveling first by train to Chicago and then Alton, Illinois. He then travelled by boat from Alton to Leavenworth, Kansas; traversing the Mississippi and Missouri Rivers. He next travelled by foot to Lawrence, Kansas, along a difficult journey which he achieved successfully only due to aid he received from a local tribe of Delaware people in Tonganoxie, Kansas, who provided him with food and shelter along his journey.

Due to the unpopularity of men from the Northern United States which was against slavery, Bancroft initially concealed that he was from the free state of Ohio and told his fellow Kansans he was from Kentucky. He had no money upon reaching Lawrence, and obtained work in that city as a construction worker. His first job was assisting the building of B. W. Woodward & Co. drug store.

The events of Bleeding Kansas impacted Bancroft's life. While traveling with two friends to Wakarusa, Kansas, Bancroft, now 19 years old, was assaulted by a pro-slavery band and one of his friends was killed. Bancroft and his other friend, a Mr. Cooke, escaped. After this he returned to Lawrence and became involved in the anti-slavery militia. He became a Jayhawker; serving under Jim Lane and the abolitionist John Brown in their Free-State army. He spent the summer of 1856 fighting in the Border War to prevent the Territory of Kansas from becoming a slave state. He continued to fight for the duration of the Border War of the 1850s. His friend Cooke was executed by hanging with Brown in 1859.

== College education and the American Civil War ==
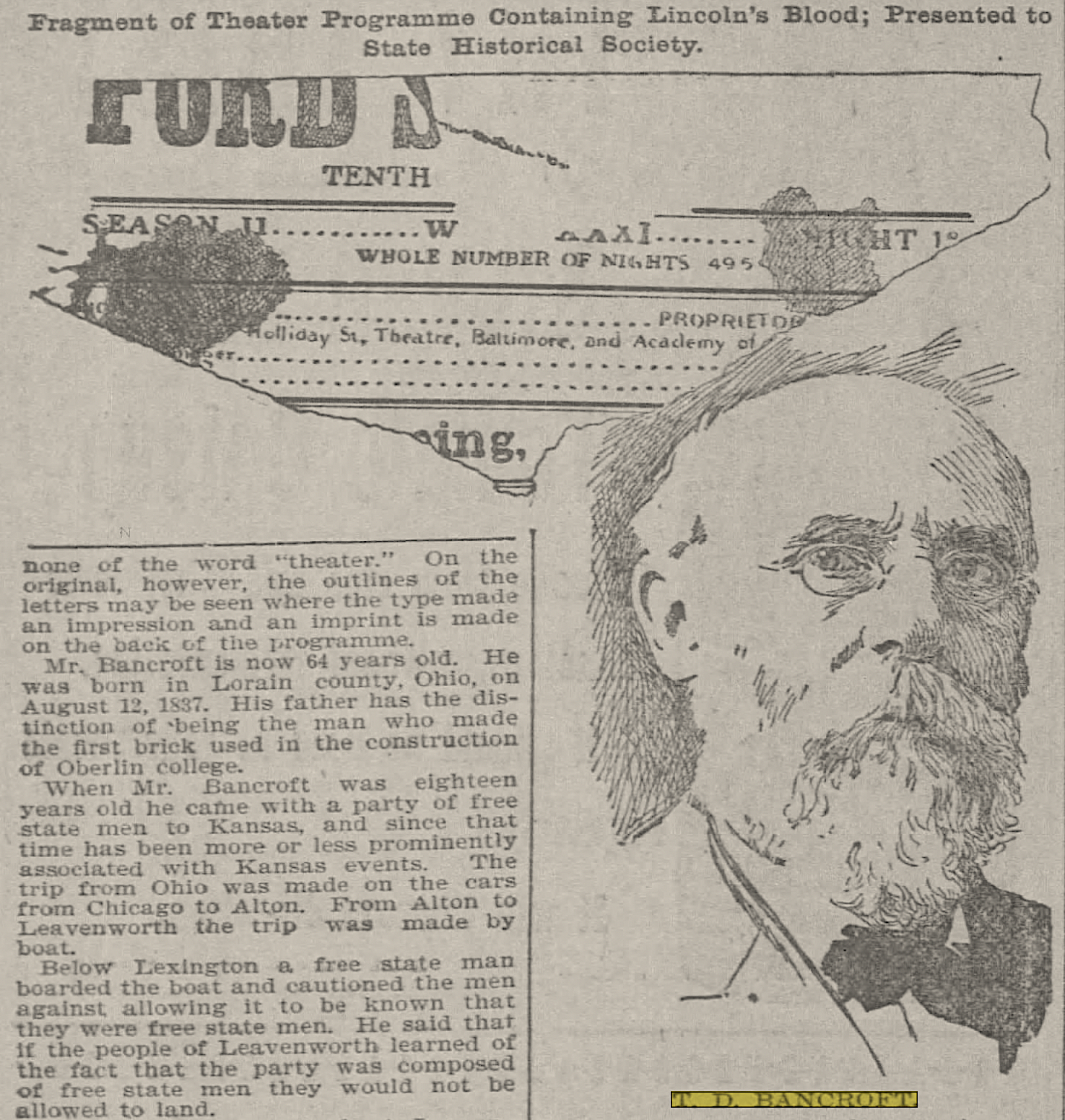
1901 newspaper clipping from The Topeka State Journal covering Bancroft's gift to the Kansas State Historical Society. Depicted are an artist rendering of Bancroft, and a facsimile of the torn program from Ford's theatre on the night of Lincoln's assassination.

After the end of the era of Bleeding Kansas, Bancroft left that territory to pursue a university education at Genesee Wesleyan Seminary in Lima, New York where he enrolled in 1860. While in college he became involved in the efforts to get Abraham Lincoln elected as president, and ultimately dropped out of school on January 28, 1861, when he left for Washington D.C.

Bancroft became a friend to Lincoln. He was present at the first inauguration of Abraham Lincoln in 1861, and that same year married Susie Archer in Washington D.C. She died a year later, not long after the birth of their son William T. Bancroft. During the early part of the American Civil War, he served as one member of a group of 110 militia men from Kansas who protected Washington D.C. This group was also led by Jim Lane who at the time was concurrently serving as one of the first United States senators from Kansas. During the war, this militia from Kansas was quartered in the East Room of the White House. Eventually, the Union Army took over the defense of Washington D.C. and the Kansas militia group was disbanded.

Bancroft then became a volunteer soldier in the Union Army and fought in roughly twenty or more battles during the war. He served under General Philip Sheridan.

On April 14, 1865, Bancroft was in the audience at Ford's Theatre when Abraham Lincoln was assassinated. As Lincoln's body was being carried from the theatre, some of the president's blood fell on a program, and Bancroft kept it. He later had that program framed, and gave it to the Kansas State Historical Society in 1901.

== Post-war life ==
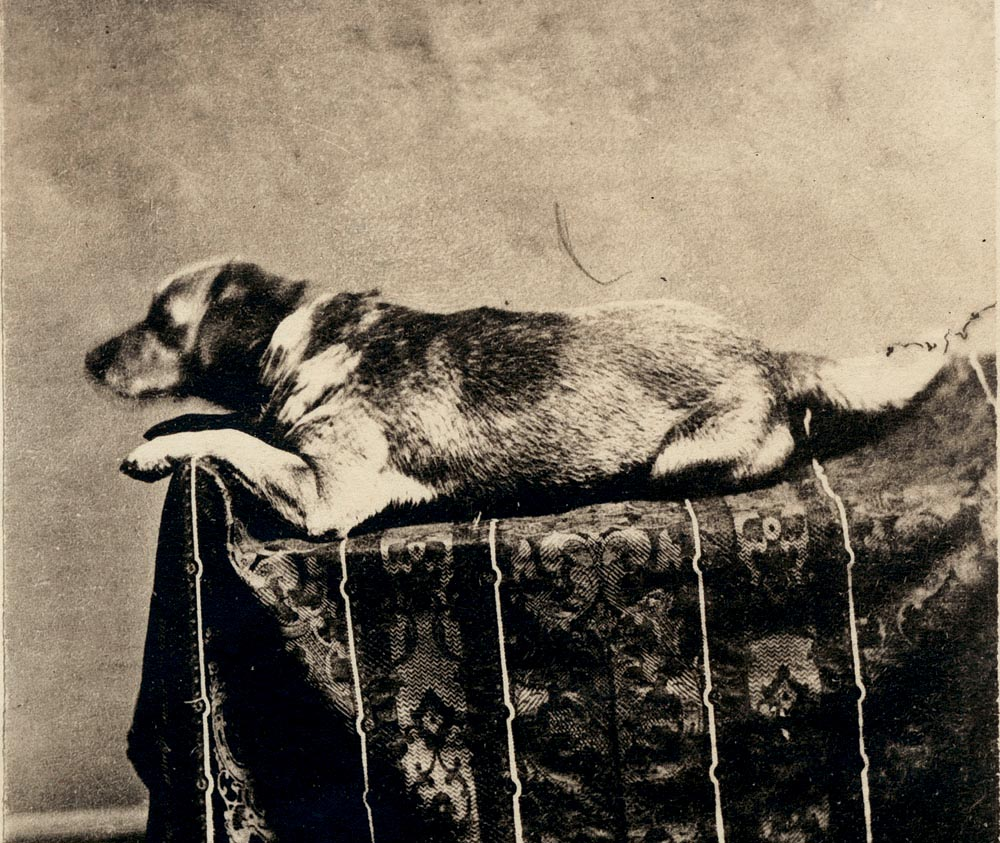
A picture of Abraham Lincoln's dog Fido which was first published in T. D. Bancroft's 1876 pamphlet.

After the American Civil War, Bancroft worked as a traveling salesman. He returned to Kansas and became invested in a mining company in Salida, Colorado. After reading several books and attending sermons given by the preacher Thomas De Witt Talmage, he became involved with Christian ministry and philanthropic work. He spent some time visiting Brooklyn, New York where he befriended Talmage and became an official member of his church, the Brooklyn Tabernacle. He lived for many years in Kansas City, Kansas, where he was head of a Christian organization that built the Bancroft Tabernacle on State St in the late 19th century. He founded that organization in 1888 as a Christian school. He lived in Kansas City with his second wife, Elida Smith, in a home located at 713 Trout Ave. They married in 1880.

Bancroft was active in the temperance movement in Kansas where he lectured on prohibition. In 1887, he was hired by the Anti-Saloon League to oversee the establishment of temperance clubs across the entire United States. He was involved in evangelical ministry to the poor and was involved in other charity work. He notably founded several public libraries in Kansas, and also established the first public library in Hot Springs, Arkansas.

Bancroft was the author of a pamphlet about Lincoln published in recognition of the centennial of the United States. In it Bancroft emphasized Lincoln's relationship to the temperance movement. The piece also included a previously unpublished photograph of Lincoln's dog, Fido, and discussed his relationship with his pet. The story captivated readers of the period who found the tale a humanizing insight into the former president that had previously not been written about. Bancroft later returned to the subject of Lincoln and his dog in a 1909 pamphlet in which he detailed the dog's death by stabbing from a drunken man; connecting the assassination of the dog to that of his master.

In his later life he lived in El Monte, California. He died in Providence, Rhode Island, on November 23, 1917, while on a lecture tour. The cause of death was by accidental gas poisoning. He was buried in Avon, New York.

== See also ==
- Joseph Hazelton
