= Ira Jones =

Author associated with Elvis Presley

- Ira Jones with Elvis Presley in Germany
- Born: July 10, 1923; Johnson County, Arkansas
- Died: July 11, 2004 (aged 81); Arkansas
- Military career
- Allegiance: United States
- Branch: United States Army
- Rank: First sergeant
- Units: 3rd Armored Division
- Conflicts: World War II
- Awards: Bronze Star; Silver Star
- Other work: Author; Public speaker

Ira Jones (July 10, 1923 – July 11, 2004) was an author, best known as the first sergeant in charge of Elvis Presley for a portion of the time Elvis served in the army.

== Early life and family ==
Ira Jones was born in Johnson County, Arkansas. He was the tenth child of Elihu Jones and Bethany Francis McAlister. His siblings were Granville Enos Jones (1905–1977), Sarah Jane (Jones) Townsend (1907–1977), Elmer Jones (1909–1970), Leona (Jones) Pitts (1911–2000), Beulah (Jones) Tumbleson (1913–2004), Columbus Jones (1914–2001), Leonard Jones (1916–1959), Eula (Jones) Owen (1919–2012), Iva (Jones) Rushing (1921–2013), Elihu Jones Jr (1925–2008), Nana Lou (Jones) Hodges (1928–2004), and Wanda Earline (Jones) Page-Davis.

His grandfather Fee Gregory Jones was a Baptist Minister and a son of Robert Jones who was a colporteur who sold publications of the American Tract Society and anti-slavery documents. Robert Jones traveled Kentucky with John Gregg Fee and in January 1858 Jones was beaten by a mob for their anti-slavery stance. Around 1860 Robert Jones along with two other men, Rev. George Candee and Rev. William Kendrick were shaved, tarred and feathered.

== Military career ==
Ira Jones enlisted on December 23, 1940. During his time in service, he received three military awards. He was awarded the Purple Heart on September 9, 1944 for "wounds incurred in action on 27 August 1944" near Paris, France. He was then awarded the Silver Star, on May 9, 1945, for "gallantry in action against the enemy on January 7, 1945." And then, on December 12, 1949, he was awarded the Bronze Star for "exemplary conduct in ground combat" while assigned to the 313th Infantry regiment on or about 21 July 1944.

== Stationed in Germany with Elvis Presley ==
In May 1956 Ira Jones was stationed in Bremerhaven, Friedberg, Germany. Scout Platoon, 1st Medium Tank Battalion, 32nd Armor, of the 3rd Armored Division, part of the U.S. Seventh Army. Ira Jones and Elvis Presley first met in the autumn of 1958 when Elvis was among the replacement troops arriving aboard the USS General Randall.

Elvis drove Jones in a jeep named "HQ 31" for nine months while serving in the Scout Platoon. Although Jones had no idea what Elvis looked like before they met, it has been reported that the two formed a close bond during their time together. 1

On May 6, 1959, Sgt Jones appeared on the popular television game show I've Got A Secret. He was stationed at Fort Benning, Georgia at the time.

Cover for Soldier Boy Elvis

Ira Jones retired from the Army in 1963 and in 1978, Jones began writing a book about the time he spent with Elvis, entitled Soldier Boy Elvis. The book was published in 1992. In the years that followed, Jones became a regular speaker at Elvis-related conventions, Bill E. Burk's Elvis World breakfasts and fan club meetings all over the world including in Germany.

Jones appeared in numerous television specials, documentaries and videos including the short-lived newsmagazine Instant Recall, hosted by John Palmer, former news anchor from NBC's The Today Show and the 2001 documentary Remembering Elvis: A Documentary , which also included interviews with comedian Steve Allen and others.

Jones died of a heart attack in July 2004 in the U.S. state of Arkansas where he grew up.

== Bibliography ==
- Soldier Boy Elvis (1993 ISBN 1-879207-23-0)
