= Samuel J. Seymour =

Possible Abraham Lincoln assassination witness

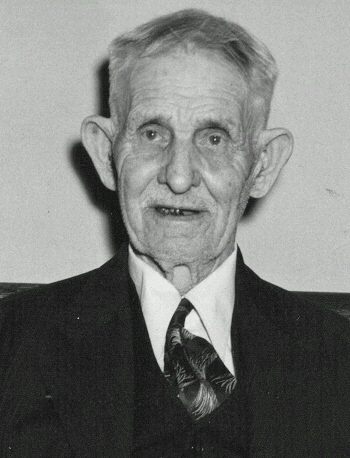
- Seymour c. 1950s
- Born: Samuel James Seymour; March 28, 1860; Easton, Maryland, U.S.
- Died: April 12, 1956 (aged 96); Arlington County, Virginia, U.S.
- Known for: Last surviving person to witness the assassination of U.S. President Abraham Lincoln; oldest person to appear on television
- Spouse: Mary Rebecca Twilley (m. 1880; died 1942)
- Children: 5

Samuel James Seymour (March 28, 1860 – April 12, 1956) was an American man who, at age 94 in 1954, may have been the last person to report having witnessed the assassination of U.S. President Abraham Lincoln on April 14, 1865. He is also known for being the oldest person to appear on television at the time, on the program I've Got a Secret on February 9, 1956, 63 days before his death.

== Early life ==
Samuel James Seymour was born on March 28, 1860 in Easton, Maryland to George and Susan Seymour. He later lived in Arlington County, Virginia. He worked as a carpenter and contractor, and lived most of his later life in Baltimore. He married Mary Rebecca Twilley in 1880, and had five children together . He died on April 12, 1956, at the home of his daughter in Arlington.

== Witness to Lincoln assassination ==
In 1954, at the age of 94, Seymour gave his alleged account of the assassination to the journalist Frances Spatz Leighton.

Seymour said that on April 14, 1865, when he was five years old, Sarah Cook, his nurse, along with his godmother Mrs. Goldsborough, who was the wife of his father's employer, took him to see Our American Cousin at Ford's Theater in Washington, D.C., where they sat in the balcony across the theater from the presidential box.

He said he saw Lincoln come into the box, waving and smiling. Later, "all of a sudden a shot rang out ... and someone in the President's box screamed. I saw Lincoln slumped forward in his seat." Seymour watched John Wilkes Booth jump from the box to the stage. Not understanding what had happened to Lincoln, he was very concerned for Booth, who apparently broke his leg after landing the jump.

In 2018, a blog post by Ford's Theatre suggested some skepticism of Seymour's account because Seymour did not publicly share his childhood memory until the age of 94. The blog post also noted that open ticket sales did not leave records of individual ticket buyers and only around 300 of about 2,000 attendees at Ford's Theatre ever reported their accounts publicly.

== I've Got a Secret appearance ==
Seymour on I've Got a Secret in 1956.

Exactly nine weeks before his death, Seymour appeared on the February 9, 1956, broadcast of the CBS TV panel show I've Got a Secret. After arriving in New York City he suffered a fall, which left him with a noticeable swelling above his right eye. Host Garry Moore, after bringing Seymour on stage, explained the injury and that he and the show's producers had urged Seymour to forgo his appearance on the show; that Seymour's doctor had left the choice up to his patient; and that Seymour very much wanted to appear.

During the game, Seymour was first questioned by panelist Bill Cullen, who quickly surmised from Seymour's age that his secret was somehow connected with the American Civil War, and he then correctly guessed that it had political significance and involved a political figure. Jayne Meadows then guessed that the political figure was Lincoln, after a fellow panelist, Henry Morgan, jokingly whispered "McKinley", and finally that Seymour had witnessed Lincoln's assassination. The rules of the show were that he would win $20 for each of the four panelists who failed to guess his secret.

Since the secret was guessed by Meadows, the second of four panelists, he would normally have won only $20 (equivalent to $237 in 2025), but Moore decided to generously award the entire $80 (equivalent to $947 in 2025) jackpot to Seymour for his courage in appearing on the show. Also, because Seymour smoked a pipe rather than cigarettes, the show's sponsor, R. J. Reynolds Tobacco Company, gave him a can of Prince Albert pipe tobacco instead of the usual prize for the show's contestants – a carton of Winston cigarettes.

== See also ==
- Joseph Hazelton, another adult who claimed to have witnessed the assassination as a child
- Albert Woolson
