= Winnie-the-Pooh (disambiguation) =

Winnie-the-Pooh is a fictional bear, and the central character in the book series by A. A. Milne.

The term Winnie-the-Pooh or Pooh Bear may also refer to:

== Milne derivation ==
- Winnie-the-Pooh (book), the first volume of stories about the fictional bear, published in 1926
- Winnie the Pooh (franchise), a Walt Disney franchise based on the books; including TV series, animated feature films, and theme in-park appearances
  - Winnie the Pooh (Disney character), a character in the franchise
  - "Winnie the Pooh" (song), a 1966 theme song written by the Sherman Brothers
  - Winnie the Pooh (2011 film), a 2011 American animated film
    - Winnie the Pooh (soundtrack), by various artists
- Winnie-the-Pooh (1969 film), a 1969 Russian animated film by Soyuzmultfilm
- Winnie-the-Pooh: Blood and Honey, a 2023 British independent slasher film by Rhys Frake-Waterfield

== Nicknames and stagenames ==
- Poo Bear, stage name of American musician and songwriter Jason Boyd
- Óscar Guerrero Silva, Mexican drug lord known for his Winnie Pooh alias.
- A controversial nickname of Chinese dictator Xi Jinping given to him when internet memes compared him to Disney's version of the character, see Censorship of Winnie-the-Pooh in China

== See also ==
- Poohsticks, a game first mentioned in The House at Pooh Corner (1928)
- "House at Pooh Corner" (song), a 1970 song written by Kenny Loggins
- Return to Pooh Corner, a 1994 album by Kenny Loggins
- Return to the Hundred Acre Wood, a 2009 book that serves as a sequel to Milne's original tales
- Pooh (band), an Italian pop band named after Winnie-the-Pooh
- Winnie (disambiguation)
- Pooh (disambiguation)
