= Poo (disambiguation) =

Poo is an informal word for feces.

Poo may also refer to:

== Arts and entertainment ==
- Poo (film), a 2008 Indian film
- Poo, a character in the video game EarthBound
- Pooja "Poo" Sharma, a character in 2001 Indian film Kabhi Khushi Kabhie Gham

== Places ==
- Poo, Himachal Pradesh, India
- Poo (Cabrales), Asturias, Spain
- Poços de Caldas Airport, Brazil, IATA code POO
- Poole railway station, England, station code POO

== Other uses ==
- Poo (surname), including a list of people with the name
- Polonium monoxide (PoO), a chemical compound
- Public Order Ordinance, primary legislation in Hong Kong
- Central Pomo language of northern California, United States, ISO 639-3 code poo

== See also ==
- Po (disambiguation)
- Poo poo (disambiguation)
- Pooh (disambiguation)
- Poop (disambiguation)
- Poos, a surname
- Pugh, a surname
- Hair washing without commercial shampoo, sometimes called no poo
