= Stigma Action Network =

Research organization

Stigma Action Network (SAN) is an international network focused on research, education and advocacy concerning HIV stigma and discrimination reduction.

== History ==
The concept of an international network to encourage reduction efforts for HIV stigma and discrimination against people with HIV/AIDS came of a meeting convened by MAC AIDS Fund (MAF) and the International Center for Research on Women (ICRW) in November, 2008 that brought 58 individuals with HIV and other affected populations, implementers and program designers, advocates, researchers, donors and trainers together. Participants analyzed best practices to reduce HIV stigma and discrimination, identified obstacles and opportunities for a cohesive response, and agreed upon the inception of a global network. On the outcomes of a working group meeting in 2009, a budget and business plan were developed with MAF awarding a grant for support for the first year of network planning and development. As a result, the SAN was formed.

Launched in 2010 at the International AIDS Conference in Vienna, SAN is a collaborative undertaking which aims to establish and augment research, program, and advocacy strategies for reducing HIV stigma worldwide, including mobilizing those invested or interested, delivering program and policy solutions, and maximizing investments in HIV services and programs.

Research has attested to the concept that reducing stigma and discrimination is critical to the success of HIV care, treatment and prevention efforts. Stigma – and fear of being stigmatized – increase the probability that people avoid taking an HIV test, disclosing their serostatus to partners or potential partners, requesting care and adhering to treatment. As such, HIV-related stigma and discrimination remain a hindrance to the global response to HIV.

== Focus ==
Specific areas of focus are care and treatment, discrimination and legal issues, faith-based organizations, community members, healthcare workers, measurement, people living with HIV, prevention of mother-to-child transmission (PMTCT), counseling and testing, injection drug users, sex workers, men who have sex with men, transgender individuals, women, children and youth and the intersection of multiple stigmas.

== Regions ==
Stigma-related HIV journal articles, reports, toolkits, surveys and communication and training materials are divided and searchable by geographic location. They are listed by continent, UN subregion and country with an extensive library of downloadable material.

== Sponsors ==
The Stigma Action Network is currently sponsored by the MAC AIDS Fund, Research Triangle Institute, USAID through the Health Policy Project, and the World Bank. Past support has been received from UNAIDS and the Elton John AIDS Foundation.
