= Karin Sham Poo =

Norwegian diplomat

Karin Elise Holmgrunn Sham Poo
- Born: Karin Holmgrunn; December 18, 1943 (age 82); Oslo
- Other names: Karin Løkhaug
- Occupation: Diplomat
- Years active: 1985 to Present
- Known for: Deputy Executive Director of UNICEF and Interim Special Representative of the UN Secretary General for Children and Armed Conflict

Karin Elise Holmgrunn Sham Poo (born Karin Holmgrunn, December 18, 1943 in Oslo), also previously known as Karin Løkhaug, is a Norwegian diplomat who held a number of senior United Nations appointments, most notably as Deputy Executive Director of UNICEF. She also held the rank of Under Secretary General whilst the Interim Special Representative of the UN Secretary General for Children and Armed Conflict.

== Career ==
She served as general manager, marketing division, and senior vice president of the Christiania Bank in Oslo from 1982 to 1985 after holding several other managerial positions with the bank, which she joined in 1962. She also held managerial posts with Bergens Kreditbank and A/S Kjobmandsbanken in Oslo. She was recruited to UNICEF Headquarters in New York in 1985 as its comptroller and became its deputy executive director (Operations) in 1987. She held the position until she retired at the end of 2004. This latter role was at the level of Assistant Secretary General.

Sham Poo served as interim special representative of the UN Secretary General for Children and Armed Conflict in 2005. This role is one at the Under Secretary General level. The United Nations regards roles at this rank as equal to that of a cabinet minister of a member state.

After retirement, she was UNICEF Special Envoy to the Caribbean until the end of 2010.

Sham Poo has been active in numerous professional, civic, and political organizations: member of the Board of Directors of the Norwegian American Chamber of Commerce and of NGO Sustainability in New York, member of the Foreign Policy Group based in Washington DC, the Women's International Forum and the Board of Trustees of the Norwegian Seamen's Church in New York.

Throughout her life, Sham Poo has been an advocate for women's rights. From 1991 - 1996, she was the chairperson of the United Nations Secretary General's Steering Committee for the Improvement of the Status of Women in United Nations Secretariat.

Sham Poo is a graduate of the Norwegian College of Banking with majors in economics, law and banking.

== Publications ==
- On My Terms, AuthorHouse, 2018. ISBN 978-1546252382

== See also ==
- James P. Grant – Executive Director of UNICEF from 1980 to 1995
- Olara Otunnu – United Nations Special Representative for Children and Armed Conflict from 1997 to 2005
