= Fido (Abraham Lincoln's dog) =

Dog owned by Abraham Lincoln (c. 1851–1865)

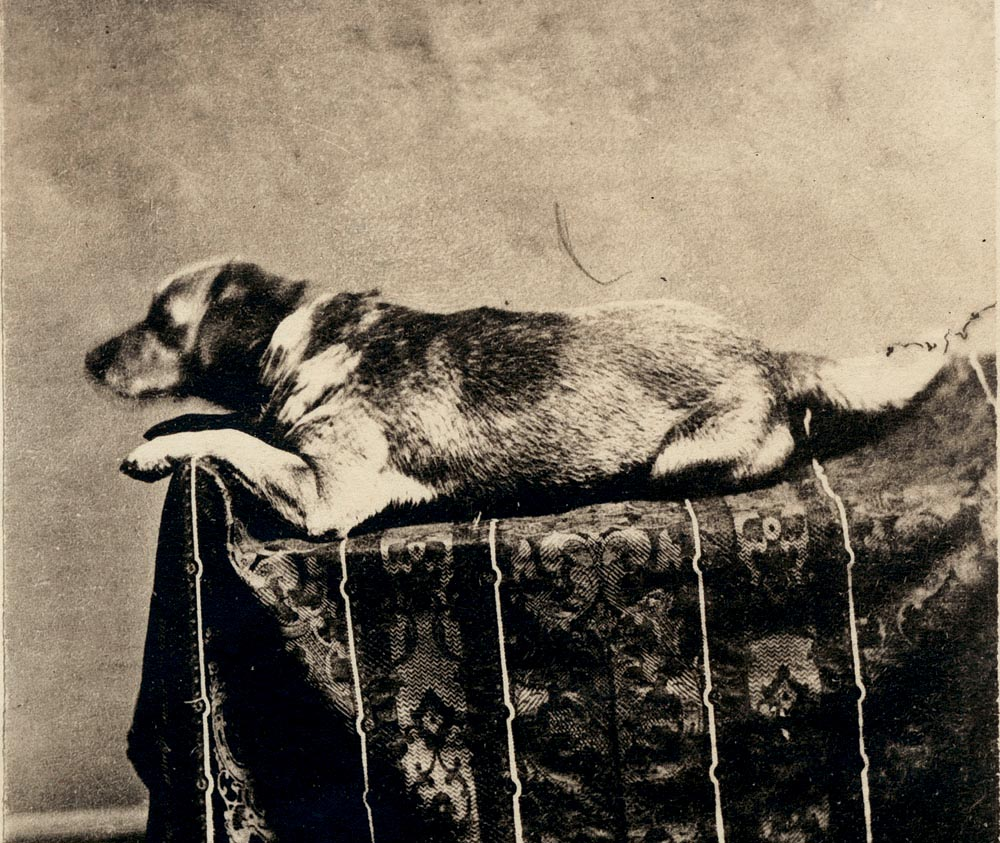
- Fido, 1860 photo by F.W. Ingmire. First published in 1876 in T.D. Bancroft's pamphlet.
- Species: Canis familiaris
- Breed: Mixed
- Sex: Male
- Born: c. 1851
- Died: 1865 (aged 13–14); Springfield, Illinois
- Cause of death: Stab wounds
- Owners: Abraham Lincoln; John R. Roll (after Lincoln's assassination)

Fido (c. 1851 – 1865) was a yellow mixed-breed dog owned by Abraham Lincoln and kept by the family for a number of years prior to Lincoln's presidency, and became a presidential pet during Lincoln's presidency, although he remained in Springfield, Illinois. Fido came to wider notice through the scholarship of T. D. Bancroft who was the first writer to publish content about Fido in a pamphlet published about Lincoln at the time of the United States' centennial in 1876.

== Early life ==
Fido was a favorite of Lincoln and his younger sons, Willie and Tad. He was known to wait for Lincoln outside the barber shop and would sometimes carry a parcel in his mouth when going home with his master. (Note: Although this story is well established in Lincoln lore and repeated by modern sources, there are no known contemporary sources to support this)

== Lincoln's election ==
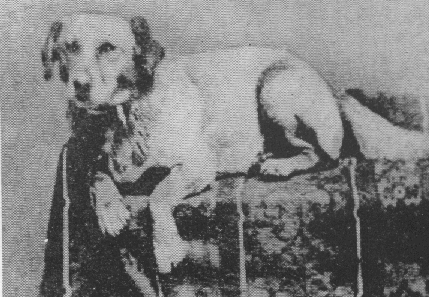
Fido, photographed c. 1861

Close to Lincoln, and friendly by nature, Fido was frightened by loud noises and crowds. After Lincoln was elected, Fido cowered from the crowds who greeted the president-elect, the fireworks, and the increased attention surrounding his master. Knowing the bustle of Washington, the number of people who would be going through the White House, and the social scene surrounding it, Lincoln and his wife, Mary, decided to leave Fido in Springfield, where the family had lived.

== Later life ==
Fido was left in the care of family friend John E. Roll. Lincoln gave Roll an old sofa that was a favorite of Fido's, and left instructions that Fido be allowed to have the run of the house, not to be scolded for tracking mud, and to be allowed to wander around the family dinner table and be fed scraps.

Fido remained with the Rolls for the rest of his life. Upon Lincoln's assassination, Roll brought Fido to Lincoln's funeral.

== Death and legacy ==
In February 1893, the Illinois State Journal reported that Fido had met his death in a tragic accident:

He (Fido) was exceedingly friendly and had a habit of showing his congeniality by depositing his muddy yellow fore paws plump on the breast of any one who addressed him familiarly. His excessive friendliness eventually caused his death in a very unique way, in that Fido suffered the fate of his master – assassination. The dog, which was a yellow fellow of moderate size, ran against Charlie Plank, who was whittling a stick with a sharp, long bladed knife. By an accidental move while the dog was expressing himself in caresses the blade was buried deep in his body. He shot out the door like a flash and was never seen again alive. His body was found about a month afterwards where he had lain down to die behind the chimney of the old Universalist church.

The Illinois State Journal would also report a different account several decades later on February 3, 1931, attributed to John L. Roll, son of John E., that Fido had been killed: "Charlie Plank, a half-drunken man, was one day whittling a pine stick when Fido came bounding along and, as usual, sprang forward with his fore feet raised. In drunken rage, the man thrust his knife into the animal, and poor Fido ran away, not to be found for a month after, when his lifeless body was discovered under an old church."

Fido has been cited as the origin of the popular name for pet dogs, in fact becoming so popular as to have become cliché and more often used as a slang reference.

== See also ==
- List of individual dogs
