= Poop =

Poop may refer to:

- Feces
- Human feces
- Defecation
- Poop deck, in naval architecture
- Pooped, a nautical term, to have a wave break over the stern or to be exhausted
- Poop (picture book), by Nicola Davies and Neal Layton, 2004
- YouTube Poop, a type of video mashup or edit
- POOPS, a book owned by Louis the yard teacher in Wayside School Gets A Little Stranger

== See also ==
- Poo (disambiguation)
- Poop emoji
- Puppis, a constellation in the southern sky
