= National Maritime Museum of Korea =

Coordinates: 35.0787°N 129.0800°E

National Maritime Museum of Korea 국립해양박물관
- Established: July 9, 2012
- Location: Dongsam-dong, Yeongdo-gu, Busan, South Korea
- Type: Maritime museum
- Website: http://www.nmm.go.kr/english/

The National Maritime Museum of Korea (Korean: 국립해양박물관) is a Korean maritime museum and the third largest museum in the South Korea. The museum was inaugurated on July 9, 2012, and is located in Dongsam-dong, Yeongdo-gu, Busan.

The museum exhibits more than 12,000 maritime relics, including the 'Joseon Missional Ship' which is the largest replica in South Korea - half the size of the actual ship. In addition to its displays, the building also includes a 4D film theater and several small aquariums.

== Collections ==
- Ship of Joseon Envoy
- Globe and celestial globe
- Secret of Sea
- Johaengilrok
- Hamgyeong-do Coastal Map
- Juk-do Jechal

== See also ==
- Busan
- Busan Marine Natural History Museum
