= Busan Marine Natural History Museum =

Museum in Busan, South Korea

Busan Marine Natural History Museum 부산해양자연사박물관
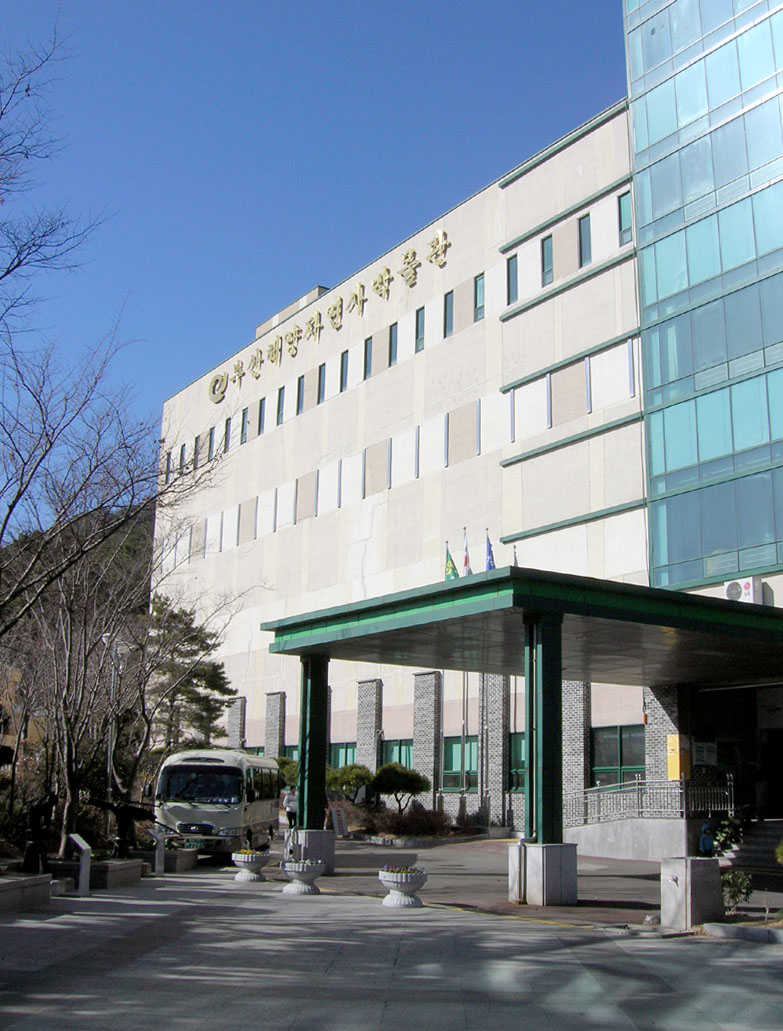
- Established: June, 1994
- Location: Oncheon-dong, Dongnae-gu; Busan, South Korea
- Coordinates: 35.2219°N 129.0758°E
- Type: Natural history museum
- Website: http://sea.busan.go.kr/

- Busan Marine Natural History Museum
- Hangul: 부산해양자연사박물관
- Hanja: 釜山海洋自然史博物館
- RR: Busan haeyang jayeonsa bangmulgwan
- MR: Pusan haeyang chayŏnsa pangmulgwan

The Busan Marine Natural History Museum (Korean: 부산해양자연사박물관) is a museum displaying exhibits on marine natural history of Busan and located in Dongnae-gu, Busan. It was opened on June 10, 1994. The purpose of the foundation is to preserve, to study and to exhibit geological and biological records about the local environment.

== See also ==
- National Maritime Museum
