= SAN =

San or SAN may refer to:

== Science and technology ==
=== Computing ===
- Storage area network
- System area network, linking clusters of computers
- Subject Alternative Name, associated with a security certificate

=== Other uses in science and technology ===
- Sinoatrial node, a region of the cardiac muscle
- Styrene-acrylonitrile resin, a copolymer plastic

== Film ==
- The Dream (1966 film), San in Serbian, a 1966 Yugoslav film
- San, the protagonist of the 1997 film Princess Mononoke
- Umbrella (film) or Sǎn, China, 2007

== Languages ==
- Saint (Spanish and Italian: San)
- San (letter) (Ϻ), an archaic Greek letter, between pi and qoppa
- San (Japanese honorific) (-san), a suffix equivalent to Mr., Mrs. or Miss

== Music ==
- San (band), a Yugoslav rock band
- San (album), by Japanese band High and Mighty Color
- "San", a song by The Beat Fleet from Pistaccio Metallic
- San (singer), a member of South Korean boy band Ateez

== Organisations ==
- Servicio Aerofotográfico Nacional, an air photography service of the Peruvian Air Force
- South African Navy
- Stigma Action Network, about HIV stigma
- Straight Arrow News, US-based news website

== Places ==
- San (river), in Poland and Ukraine
- San, Burkina Faso, Pompoï Department, Balé Province
- San, Mali, Ségou Region
- San, Wiang Sa, a subdistrict of Wiang Sa district, Nan, Thailand
- Sanitarium (healthcare), sometimes nicknamed San
  - Sydney Adventist Hospital, Australia
  - Battle Creek Sanitarium, in Michigan, US
- Saň, a village and part of Višňová (Liberec District) in the Czech Republic

== Transport ==
- San, buses by Polish manufacturer Autosan
- SAN Ecuador (Servicios Aéreos Nacionales, ICAO code: SAN), a defunct airline
- Sandersville Railroad (AAR reporting mark: SAN), in the US
- San Diego International Airport (IATA code: SAN), in California, US
- Sandown railway station (National Rail code: SAN), Isle of Wight, UK
- Siliwangi Antar Nusa, a bus company in Indonesia
- Société Aéronautique Normande, a defunct French aircraft manufacturer

== Other ==
- San people, indigenous people of Southern Africa
  - San religion, their traditional religions
- San Kim Sean (1945–2025), Cambodian martial art teacher
- Senior Advocate of Nigeria, a rank
- Standard algebraic notation, in chess

== See also ==
- Sans (disambiguation)
