= Korea Strait =

Sea passage between Japan and South Korea

Coordinates: 34°35′58″N 129°47′48″E

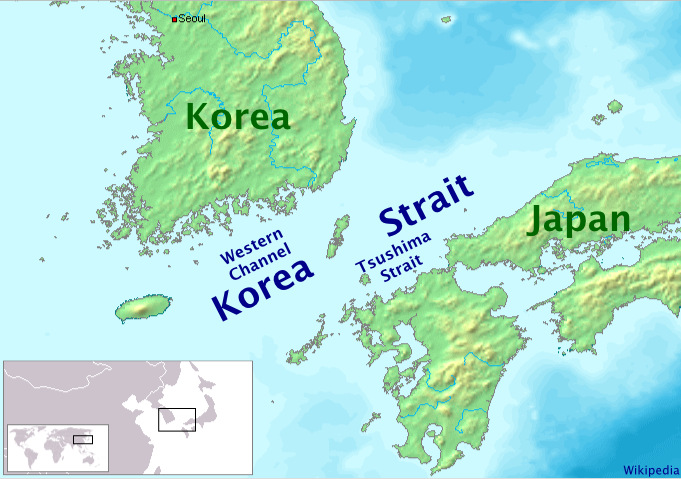
- Map showing the Korea Strait.

Japanese name
- Kanji: 対馬海峡/朝鮮海峡
- Hiragana: つしまかいきょう/ちょうせんかいきょう
- Revised Hepburn: Tsushima Kaikyō /Chōsen kaikyō

South Korean name
- Hangul: 대한해협
- Hanja: 大韓海峽
- Revised Romanization: Daehan Haehyeop

North Korean name
- Chosŏn'gŭl: 조선해협
- Hancha: 朝鮮海峽
- McCune–Reischauer: Chosŏn Haehyŏp

The Korea Strait is a sea passage in East Asia between the Korean Peninsula and Japan. It connects the East China Sea, the Yellow Sea and the Sea of Japan in the northwest Pacific Ocean. The strait is split by Tsushima Island into two parts: the Western Channel, and the Tsushima Strait or Eastern Channel. It is economically important, as many shipping lanes pass through the strait, and both Japan and South Korea allow free passage through it.

In ancient times, both Buddhism and Mongol invaders passed over the strait to reach Japan. More recently, it was the site of the 1950 Battle of Korea Strait during the Korean War. A tunnel running underneath the strait connecting Japan and Korea, the Japan–Korea Undersea Tunnel, has been proposed to connect the two countries.

== Geography ==
To the north, the Korea Strait is bounded by the southern coast of the Korean Peninsula. And to the south, it by the southwestern Japanese islands of Kyūshū and Honshū. It is about 200 km (120 mi) wide and averages about 90 to 100 meters (300 ft) deep.

Tsushima Island divides the Korea Strait into the western channel and the Tsushima Strait. The western channel is deeper (up to 227 meters) and narrower than the Tsushima Strait.

== Currents ==
A branch of the Kuroshio Current passes through the strait. Its warm branch is sometimes called the Tsushima Current. Originating along the Japanese islands this current passes through the Sea of Japan then divides along either shore of Sakhalin Island, eventually flowing into the northern Pacific Ocean via the strait north of Hokkaidō and into the Sea of Okhotsk north of Sakhalin Island near Vladivostok. The water-mass characteristics vary widely because of the low-salinity waters of the southeast coasts of Korea and China.

== Economic significance ==
Numerous international shipping lanes pass through the strait, including those carrying much of the traffic bound for the ports of southern South Korea. Both South Korea and Japan have restricted their territorial claims in the strait to 3 nautical miles (5.6 km) from shore, so as to permit free passage through it.

Passenger ferries travel numerous routes across the strait. Commercial ferries run from South Korean Busan, Geoje to Japanese ports including Fukuoka, Tsushima, Shimonoseki, and Hiroshima. Ferries also connect Tsushima Island with Fukuoka, and South Korea's Jeju Island with the Korean mainland. Ferries connecting Busan and Japanese cities with ports in China also traverse the strait.

Japan's territorial waters extend to three nautical miles (5.6 km) into the strait instead of the usual twelve, reportedly to allow nuclear-armed United States Navy warships and submarines to transit the strait without violating Japan's prohibition against nuclear weapons in its territory.

== Naming of the strait ==
	Korean Peninsula - Kyushu	Korean Peninsula - Tsushima Island	Tsushima Island - Kyushu
International name (commonly used in English)	Korea Strait	Western Channel	Eastern Channel
South Korean name	대한해협 / 大韓海峽; Daehan Haehyeop "Korea Strait"	서수로 / 西水路; Seo-suro "Western Channel"	동수로 / 東水路; Dong-suro "Eastern Channel"
North Korean name	조선해협 / 朝鮮海峽; Chosŏn Haehyŏp "Korea Strait"	(None)	
Japanese name	対馬海峡; Tsushima Kaikyō "Tsushima Strait"	対馬海峡 or 西水道; Tsushima Kaikyō or Nishi-suidō "Korea Strait" or "Western Channel"	対馬海峡 or 東水道; Tsushima Kaikyō or Higashi-suidō "Tsushima Strait" or "Eastern Channel"

== Historic impact ==
=== Land bridge ===
During the Pleistocene glacial cycles, the Korea Strait and the Bering Straits, and the Yellow Sea were often narrowed and the Japanese islands may at times have been connected to the Eurasian Continent through the Korean Peninsula or Sakhalin. At times, the Sea of Japan was said to be a frozen inner lake due to the lack of warm Tsushima Current and various plants and large animals, such as the Palaeoloxodon naumanni are believed to have spread into Japan.

=== Early history ===
Historically, these narrows served as a highway for high risk voyages. The shortest distance between Busan, South Korea, and Tsushima Island is about 50 km, as is the shortest distance from Tsushima to Iki Island, Japan.

In the 6th century, Buddhism (Mahāyāna Buddhism) was transmitted by Baekje people to the easternmost Japan of the Emperor Kinmei's era over this strait (See also: East Asian Buddhism and Buddhism in Japan).

=== Mongol invasion ===
A joint Mongol-Korea fleet crossed this strait and attempted to invade Japan in 1274 and 1281. The force severely ravaged the Tsushima Island on the way to Japan but failed to defeat Japan.

=== Wokou and Ōei Invasion ===
After the Mongolian invasion ravaged Tsushima, it became a base of the Wokou (Japanese pirates). The Korean Joseon dynasty sent a fleet to Tsushima in 1419 for the suppression of Wokou activity. Korea subsequently agreed to grant the Japanese limited trading privileges.

=== Battle of Tsushima ===
The Battle of Tsushima, fought between the Japanese and Russian navies on May 27 and May 28, 1905, took place in the Tsushima Strait part of the Korea Strait, east of the north part of Tsushima and due north of Iki Island. The Russian fleet was destroyed by the Japanese.

=== Battle of Korea Strait ===
The Battle of Korea Strait was a naval battle fought on the first day of the Korean War, 25–26 June 1950, between the navies of South Korea and North Korea. A North Korean troop transport carrying hundreds of soldiers attempted to land its cargo near Busan but was encountered by a South Korean patrol ship and sunk. It was one of the first surface actions of the war and resulted in an important South Korean victory.

=== Future ===
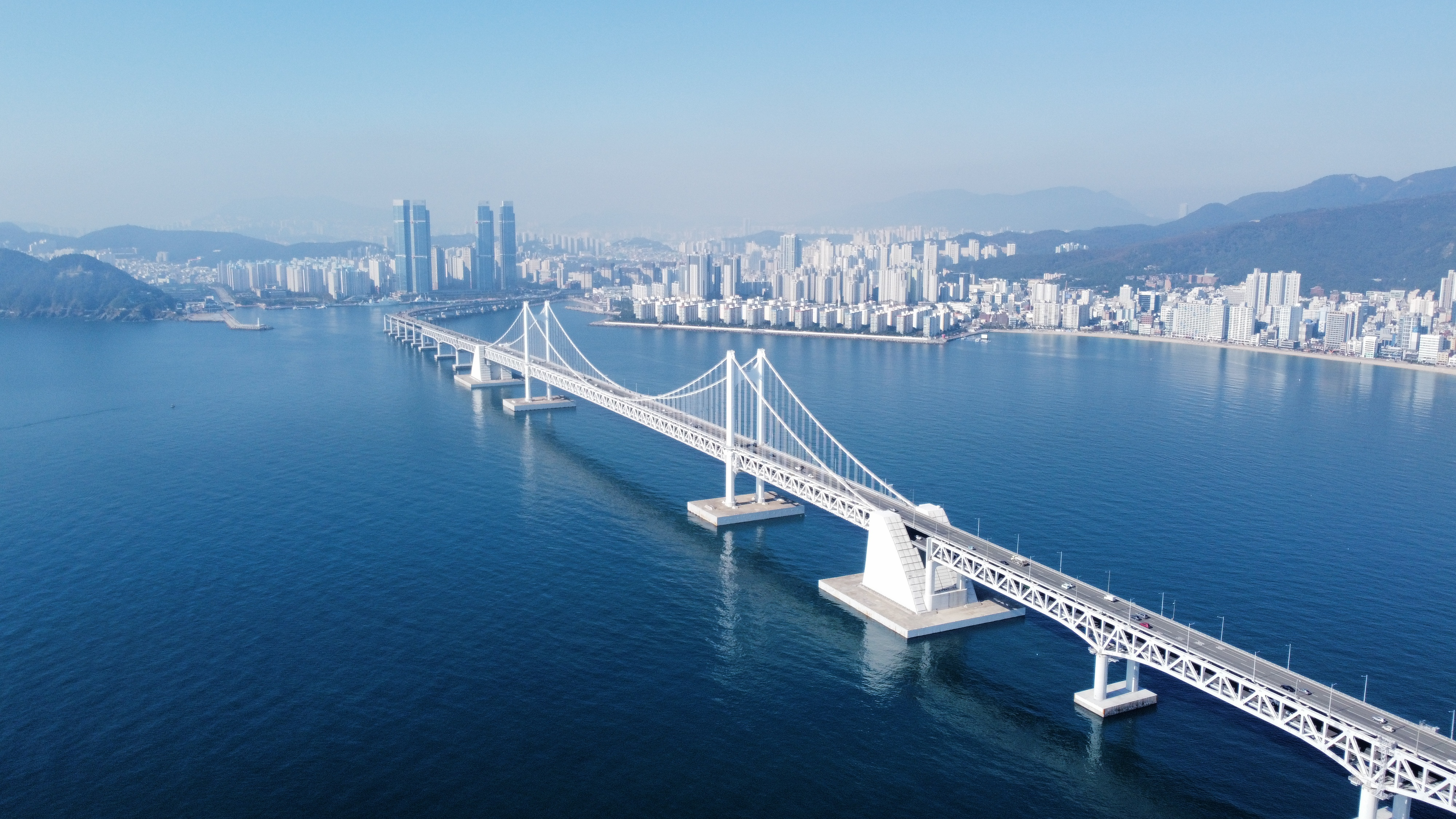
Gwangan Bridge, Busan, South Korea spanning a small part of the strait

The possibility of a Japan–Korea Undersea Tunnel or bridge, similar to the Channel Tunnel running under the English Channel between France and the United Kingdom, has been discussed for decades.

== See also ==
- Geography of Korea
- List of Japan-related topics
- Geography of Japan
- Russo-Japanese War
- Tsushima City
- Sea of Japan
- Namhae
