= Pooh (disambiguation) =

Pooh, or Winnie-the-Pooh, is a fictional teddy bear created by A. A. Milne.

Pooh may also refer to:

== People ==
- Ritsuko Pooh (born 1960), Japanese obstetrician and gynecologist
- Pooh (comedian) (Reynold Garcia; born 1974), Filipino singer and comedian
- Pooh Richardson (Jerome Richardson Jr; born 1966), American basketball player
- Pooh Shiesty (Lontrell Donell Williams Jr; born 1999), American rapper
- Pooh Williamson (Alvin Williamson; born 1973), American basketball player
- Eugene Jeter (born 1983), American basketball player in Ukraine nicknamed Pooh Jeter
- Big Pooh (Thomas Louis Jones III; born 1980), American rapper
- DJ Pooh (Mark S. Jordan; born 1969), American record producer, rapper, screenwriter and film director
- Pooh-Man (Lawrence Lee Thomas; born 1971), American rapper also known as MC Pooh

== Other uses ==
- Pooh (band), a 1966 Italian rock band
- Pooh, one of the Dover Strait coastal guns

== See also ==
- Clarence "Pooh Bear" Williams (1975–2022), American football player
- Winnie-the-Pooh (disambiguation)
- Poo (disambiguation)
- Jason Paul Douglas Boyd, American singer-songwriter and record producer professionally known as Poo Bear
