= Busan Harbor Bridge =

Cable-stayed bridge in South Korea

Busan Harbor Bridge 부산항대교
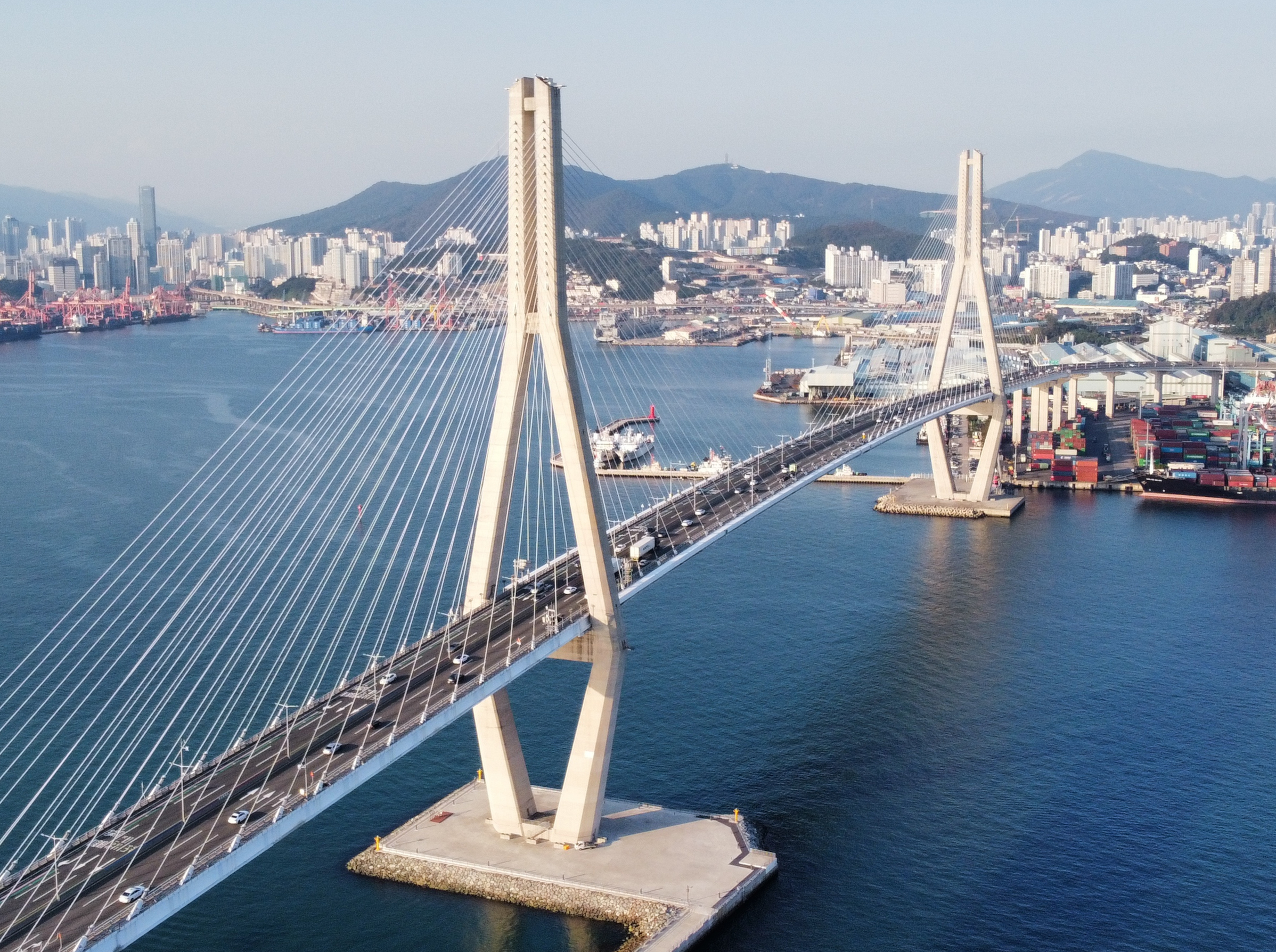
- Coordinates: 35°06′21.5″N 129°03′52.6″E
- Crosses: Sea of Japan
- Locale: Busan, South Korea

Characteristics
- Design: Cable-stayed bridge
- Total length: 3,368 metres (11,050 ft)
- Longest span: 540 metres (1,770 ft)

History
- Opened: 2014

Location
- Interactive map of Busan Harbor Bridge

Busan Harbor Bridge (Korean: 부산항대교; Hanja: 釜山港大橋) is a bridge in Busan, South Korea. The bridge connects the districts of Yeongdo District and Nam District. The bridge was completed in April 2014.

It appeared in episode 420 of the television show Running Man.

== See also ==
- Transportation in South Korea
- List of bridges in South Korea
