= Battle of Korea Strait =

1950 naval battle in the Korea Strait

Coordinates: 35°10′46″N 129°04′32″E

- Part of the Korean War
Date	25–26 June 1950
Location	off the coast of Busan, in the Korea Strait
Result	South Korean victory

Belligerents
North Korea	South Korea

Commanders and leaders
Unknown	Captain Nam Choi

Units involved
Korean People's Navy	Republic of Korea Navy

Strength
1 steamer	1 submarine chaser: ROKS Baekdusan (PC-701)

Casualties and losses
600 killed or wounded 1 steamer sunk	2 killed 4 wounded 1 submarine chaser damaged

The Battle of Korea Strait (Korean: 대한해협 해전; Hanja: 大韓海峽海戰; RR: daehanhaehyeop haejeon; MR: taehanhaehyŏp haejŏn) was a single ship action fought on the first day of the Korean War on 25–26 June 1950, between the navies of South Korea and North Korea. A North Korean troop transport carrying hundreds of soldiers attempted to land its invasion force near Busan but was encountered by the South Korean patrol ship ROKS Baekdusan and sunk. It was one of the first surface actions of the war and resulted in an important South Korean victory.

== Background ==
The Korean War began on 25 June 1950 with a massive North Korean invasion across the 38th parallel and into the south. Around twenty hours after the beginning of the invasion, a North Korean steamer was assigned to insert highly-trained commandos belonging to the elite 766th Independent Infantry Regiment near the port of Busan at the southeastern coast of the Korean Peninsula, intending to capture the city from South Korean forces. Originally a freighter used by American forces, the vessel was hijacked by communist guerillas in October 1949 and taken to the North, where it was refurbished with machine guns and put into service with the Korean People's Navy as a troop transport.

The South Korean warship involved in the battle, the submarine chaser ROKS Baekdusan, was originally in service with the United States Navy during World War II as PC-823. After being decommissioned in 1948, the ship was bought by the Republic of Korea Navy for $60,000 as its first combat capable vessel.

== Battle ==
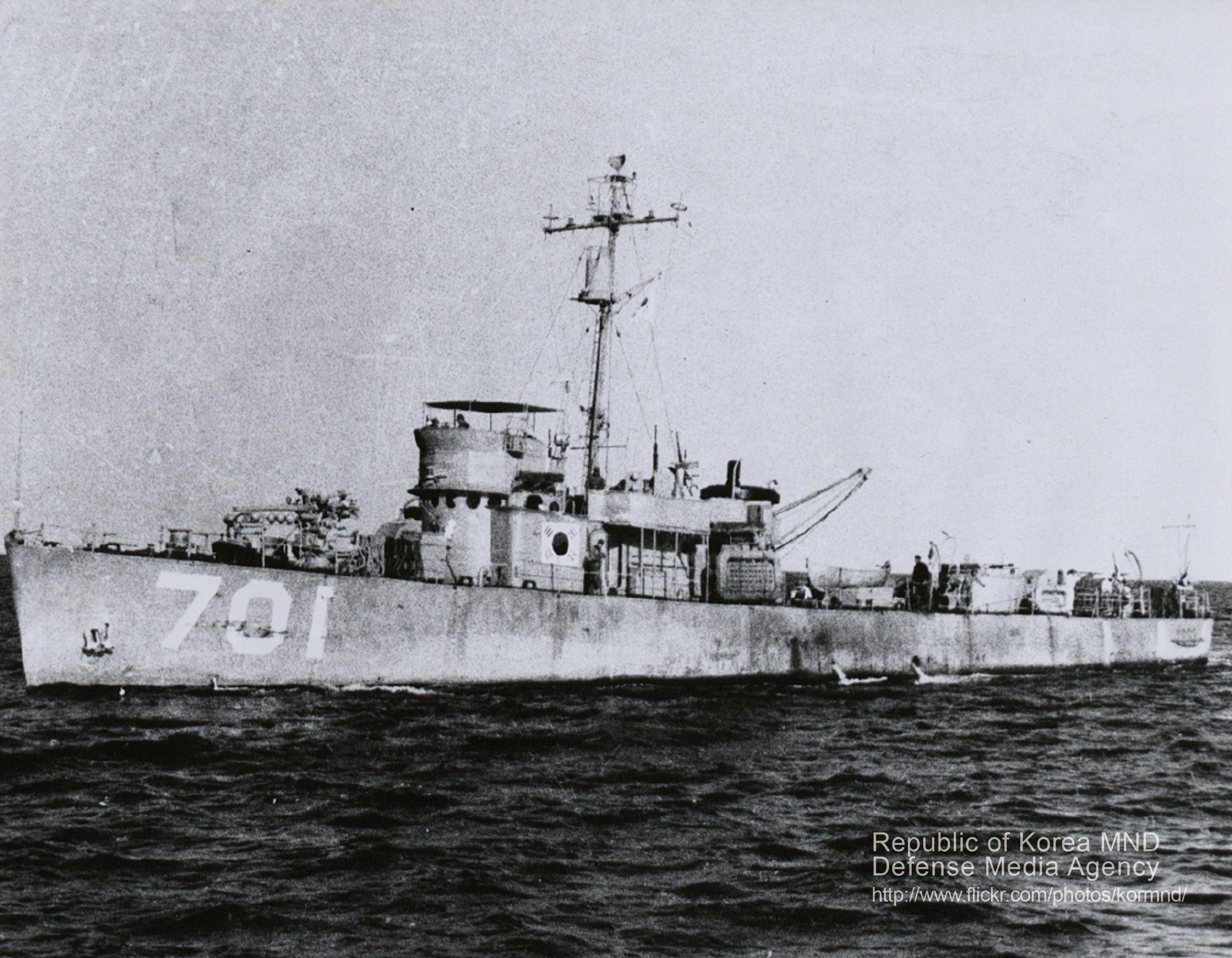
ROKS Baekdusan with the South Korean flag painted on the side of the ship's wheelhouse

Early before dawn on 25 June 1950, while on a routine patrol from the main base at Jinhae, the Baekdusan sighted the enemy North Korean vessel approximately 16 nautical miles off the coast from Busan.

The Baekdusan first attempted to establish contact with the enemy steamer using signal lights but received no direct response. However, when the South Koreans turned on their searchlights against them, the soldiers aboard the steamer opened fire using their machine guns, hitting the ship's bridge. The helmsman, Private First Class Kim Chang-hak, alongside Private First Class Jeon Byeong-ik, were killed, while the officer of the deck was seriously wounded. The freighter then began to flee to the north. In response, the Baekdusan returned fire with her main 3-inch anti-aircraft gun and six .50-caliber machine guns, coming in as close as 400 meters of the enemy steamer. When several of the North Korean commandos onboard attempted to swim to the Baekdusan in order to board the ship, the South Korean sailors fired their M1 Garand rifles upon them and inflicted heavy casualties. After a relentless four-hour pursuit by the crew of the Baekdusan, the steamer finally sunk near Tsushima Island, bringing an end to the skirmish.

== Aftermath ==
The victory at the Korea Strait proved to be of major importance to South Korea, as it temporarily hindered the rapid North Korean advance through the country. By August, Busan remained as the sole South Korean port city not captured by North Korea. It would remain so until the US-led United Nations landings at Inchon in September 1950.

The mast of the Baekdusan is now preserved at the Korea Naval Academy in Jinhae.

== See also ==
- List of single-ship actions
