= 2010–2011 Hanjin Heavy Industries strike =

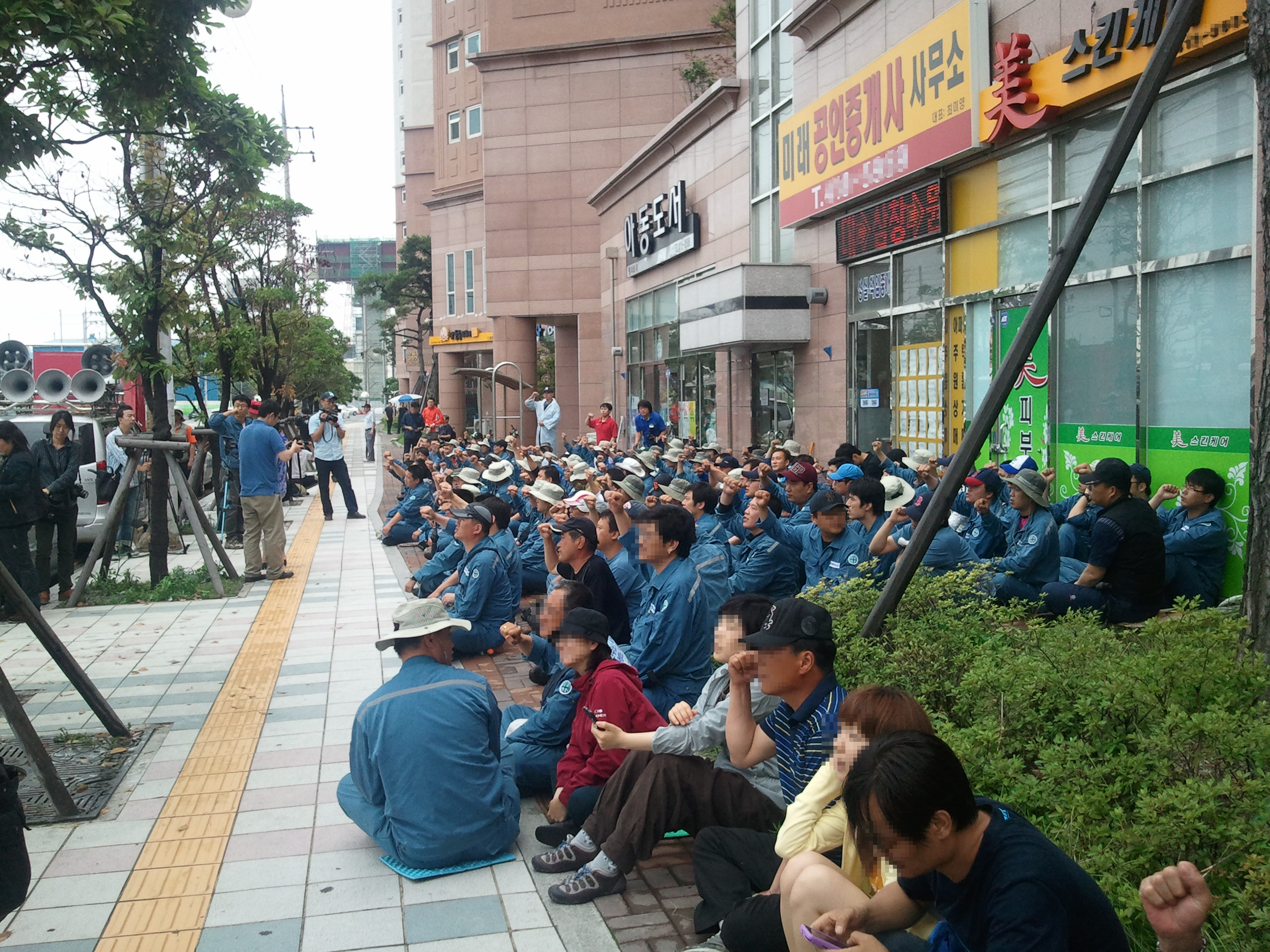
- Sit-in on 28 June 2011
- Date: 28 December 2010 – 10 November 2011
- Location: Yeongdo District, Busan, South Korea; Subic, Zambales, Philippines; 35°5′45.03″N 129°3′11.64″E; 14°49′39.29″N 120°12′42.42″E
- Caused by: Layoff of 400 workers from Hanjin Heavy Industries' Shipbuilding Division
- Goals: An end to company lay-offs, and a return to work for those dismissed from the company
- Methods: Strike, Protest, Demonstration, Sit-in
- Result: New labor agreement reached with management

Parties
Hanjin Heavy Industries Workers; South Korean political parties: Democratic Party; Participation Party; Democratic Labor Party; New Progressive Party; Civic Group: Hope Bus	Hanjin Heavy Industries & Construction Management; Civic Group: Republic of Korea Parents' Association

Number
Over 10,000	Over 3,000

Casualties and losses
More than 20 people injured	A dozen injured

Casualties
- Deaths: 0
- Injuries: ~40

The 2010–2011 Hanjin Heavy Industries strike was a strike in South Korea and the Philippines from 28 December 2010 to 10 November 2011, resulting from the layoff of 400 Hanjin Heavy Industries employees. The goal of the strike was to prevent the layoffs and improve overall working conditions.

== Timeline ==
=== South Korea ===
==== Initial strike ====
On 15 December 2010, Hanjin Heavy Industries & Construction Co., LTD announced the lay-off of 400 blue collar workers. As a result, the labor union began striking within 5 days. Hanjin management subsequently refused to meet with the labor union for roughly the next 16 days. In response, from 6 January 2011, Kim Jin-sook, then a committee member of the Busan branch of the Korean Confederation of Trade Unions, began to occupy the 35 m (115 ft) high No. 85 crane at Yeongdo Shipyard. Hanjin management immediately submitted legal paperwork to have Kim removed and pay one million won in damages. The stalemate between the two sides continued until 14 February, when Chae Kil-yong (채길용) of the workers' union occupied the 45m high No.17 crane. The No.17 crane was released by protesters in a news conference on 13 May, after an 87-day period of occupation.

==== First Hope Bus event ====
Crane No.85 remained occupied, prompting the civic group Creating a World Without a Temporary Worker (비정규직 없는 세상 만들기 네트워크) to organize a Hope Bus event for strike encouragement on 11 June. The Hope Bus, with 44 people on board, was blocked from entering the shipping yard by police, whom deemed the protest illegal. After a 20-minute blockade, the Hope Bus successfully reached the Hanjin Heavy Industries shipping yard. As the clock hit midnight of 12 June, about 10 ladders were erected for the protesters to climb the 4m high wall. Police unsuccessfully attempted to remove the ladders, resulting in the injury of about 20 protesters and about a dozen Hanjin employees. Around 3 o'clock that morning, the Hope Bus protesters were able to rendezvous with Kim Jin-sook on Crane No. 85. A pop performance, dance, and poetry began around 4 o'clock and ended around 11 o'clock that morning. As Kim Yeo-jin and five other Hope Bus members left the shipyard, they were apprehended by police and not released until 3 o'clock that afternoon.

==== Second Hope Bus event ====
With the stand-off between management and labor ongoing and the success of the first Hope Bus, a second Hope Bus was organized on 9 July 2011. Some estimates gave 10,000 Hope Bus protesters present on 9 July, while the police estimated protesters to number over 7,000. The initially planned protest was opened by several famous South Korean lawmakers, including Chung Dong-young of the Democratic Party and Rhyu Si-min of the Participation Party. Lawmakers present were of opposition to the conservative Lee Myung-bak administration in power at the time. As such, representatives from Democratic Labor Party, New Progressive Party, and other more minor parties were present on 9 July. The evening event was initially intended to be held at Busan Station Square, where it occurred peacefully until approximately 9:20 pm. Protesters began to take to the one side of the central road, marching toward Hanjin Heavy Industries. Initially, the police controlled the central road for the protesters. However, the police quickly concluded that the protests had deteriorated by violent demonstrations such as road trespassing and attempting unauthorized entry into Hanjin Heavy Industries.

The police issued an initial warning for the protesters to disperse, before using water cannons to fire a diluted tear gas mixture into the crowd. The tear gas mixture was allegedly diluted below the standard ratio owing to the presence of the elderly and the young at the protest. Nevertheless, protesters would deem the tear gas tactic an inhumane use of police force soon after the event. In a statement, the Korean Federation Medical Activist Groups for Health Rights (보건의료단체연합) criticized the used of tear gas liquid. The police were also publicly criticized for leaving behind tear gas at the site of the event, owing to the methylene chloride and CS gas that is harmful to humans.

In the process of dispersing protesters, police arrested 50 people on site. If any charges were found against those apprehended, they were punished accordingly.

As a result of the situation on 9 July, Sohn Hak-kyu of the Democratic Party made a statement on 12 July, warning potential protesters to not interfere with the planned employee-only demonstration at Hanjin Heavy Industries on 14 July. Most notably, Choi Eun-bo (최은보), a Democratic Party member from the local Yeongdo District was disciplined by his superiors for his role in the 9 July incident. As a result, Choi came out against the Hope Bus on 18 July, insisting that the quality of life of local residents took priority.

==== Third Hope Bus event ====
On 30 July 2011, a third Hope Bus event kicked off with over 10,000 self-claimed participants, though police estimated approximately 5000 were present. The organizers of the Hope Bus pledged to carry out the third protest without large-scale conflict. The events on the day of the third Hope Bus began at 11am, as more than 2,000 Hope Bus protesters gathered onto more than fifty buses and headed towards Busan. By 6:30pm, Hope Bus participants from over 73 different cities began to arrive at Busan Station. In response, at 8pm, as approximately 1,000 people representing the Yeongdo Autonomous District Residents Commission (영도주민자치위원회) as well as other local residents gathered at the Busan bridge and the Yeongdo bridge in order to stop the protesters from gathering. The local residents commission was unsuccessful at stopping the protest, as participants gathered approximately 800m away from the Yeongdo shipyard at 9pm.

Also at 9pm, as the protest began to gather, 300 members of conservative groups, including the Korea Parents Association, physically blocked two public buses from crossing Yeongdo bridge into Yeongdo shipyard. The conservative protesters asked the bus passengers to disembark before forcibly dragging passengers off the bus. Before police could take control of the situation, one man was injured. The bridge would not be cleared until 11pm, when the rest of the protesters made their final advance to the official gathering place 800m from the Yeongdo shipyard. In the process of the final advance of the protesters, there were more minor scuffles with police.

In order to prevent protesters from advancing towards Hanjin Heavy Industries and the still occupied Crane No. 85, the police established a car wall between the protesters and the shipyard. The official event, dubbed the Nanjang Culture Festival (난장 문화제) lasted from 2am to 9am, with [Pungmul], songs, dances, and speeches featured. Via mobile phone, Kim Jin-sook was able to thank protesters for their support. By 6am, the Kyunghyang Shinmun reported that police estimated 3,500 participants remained. The remaining protesters cleaned the protest site at 8am, closing the festivities at 9-9:30am. The protest concluded at Busan City Hall, where a 30-minute to 1 hour press conference was given at 11 or 11:30am.

The Chairman of Hanjin Heavy Industries, Cho Nam-ho, responded to the second and third Hope Bus protests in a press conference on 10 August after returning from a 50-day business trip. Cho appealed to the people and government for financial assistance.

==== Fourth Hope Bus event ====
Attendance dwindled to 3,000 for the fourth Hope Bus event, which occurred on 28 August. The fourth Hope Bus event was held at 10:00am at the Independence Gate in Seoul, with the intent of peacefully marching towards Hanjin Heavy Industries Headquarters beginning at 10:30am. The protesters successfully reached within 30m of Hanjin Heavy Industries at 11:40am, but they were quickly blocked by a wall of more than 7,000 police officers. At 12pm, the police gave protesters until 12:10pm to disperse before they took action. True to their word, the police proceeded to forcibly dissolve the protest with water cannons.

==== Fifth Hope Bus event ====
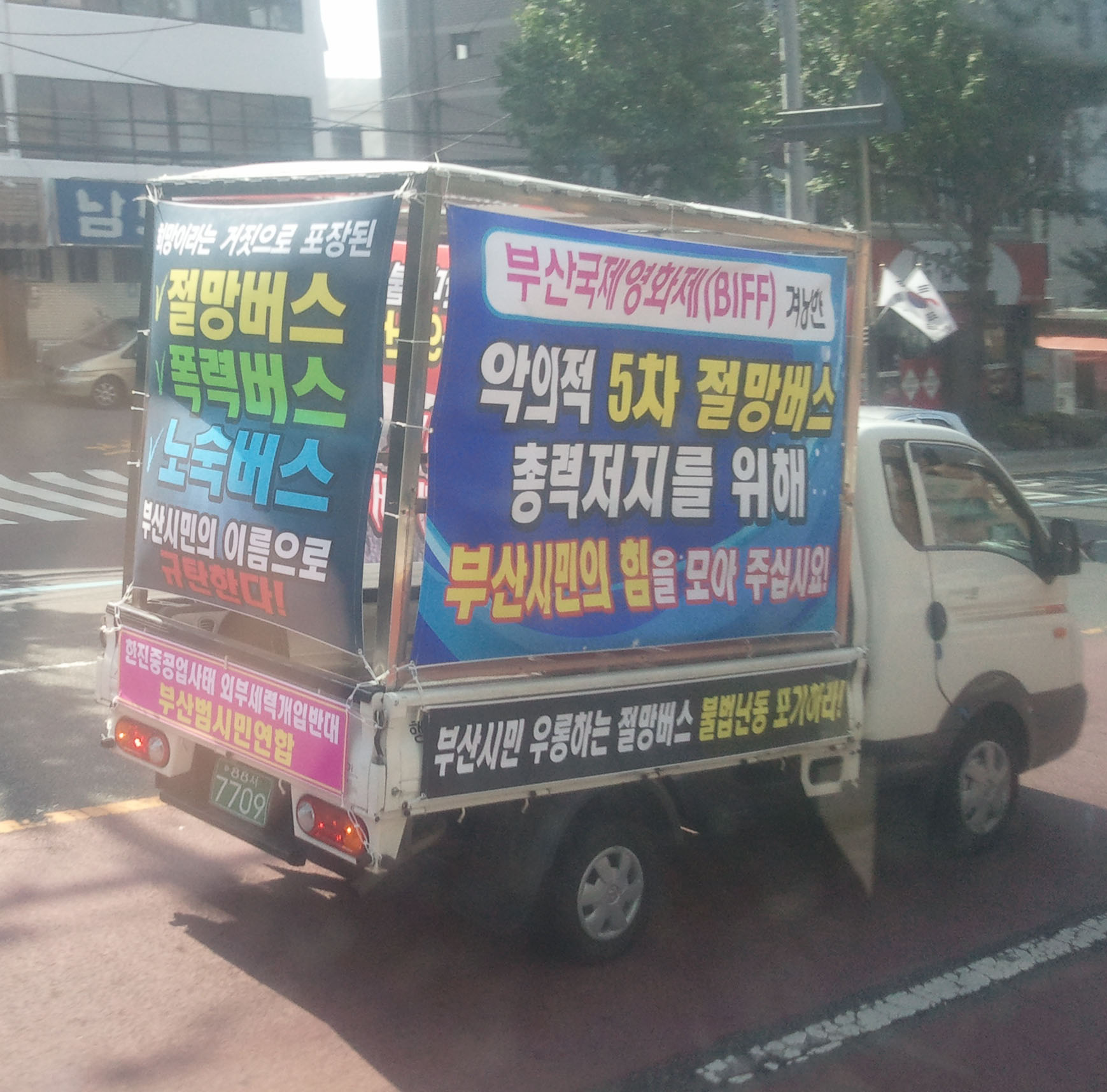
A truckside advertisement opposing the fifth Hope Bus event

The fifth Hope Bus was announced on 25 September, with the upcoming event to take place on 8 October. This date coincided with the opening weekend of the 16th Busan International Film Festival. In a joint press conference at Busan City Hall on 26 September, Busan mayor Hur Nam-sik and Busan City Council chairman Jae Jong-mo (제종모) announced their opposition to the fifth Hope Bus event. Hur and Jae's given reasoning was that the four prior buses were detrimental to solving the labor crisis, and had done great damage to the citizens of Busan. Furthermore, Hur and Jae asserted that stopping the Hope Bus event would contribute to the success of the film festival. The conservative Advancement Unification Party was against the fifth Hope Bus event as well. In a statement on 27 September, party spokesperson Yoon Hyeon-yeon (윤혜연) blamed government incompetence and the ignorance of Hope Bus participants towards the concerns of the local citizens of Busan for the ongoing Hanjin Heavy Industries crisis. Yoon maintained that the presence of a fifth Hope Bus event would present traffic dangers as well as a black mark on the international reputation of South Korea.

As the 16th Busan International Film Festival opened on 6 October, actress Kim Kkot-bi, director Kim Jho Gwangsoo, and director Yeo Gyun-dong unveiled a message supporting the Hanjin Heavy Industry strikers on the red carpet. The statement read, "I ♥ CT 85, GANG JUNG" in English, referring to the occupation of crane No. 85 as well as the local opposition to the construction of the Jeju Civilian-Military Complex Port.

The initial plan for the fifth Hope Bus was to have the rally begin at 6pm on 8 October, with a peaceful march to Hanjin Heavy Industries. Before the fifth Hope Bus began, the police threatened action if any protesting took place outside of the reported rally areas.

A reported 4,000 protesters came from around the country to participate in the fifth Hope Bus. However, the Busan Station, Yeongdo shipyard, and various other checkpoints soon became barricaded by police. Six buses from Seoul were detained as soon as they arrived at Busan Station, and six protesters were arrested in the process. At 10:50 PM, protesters re-organized and attempted a second march to the Yeongdo shipyard, but were immediately met with water cannons diluted with tear gas. In all, 59 protesters were detained that night, with 56 remaining in police custody the next day.

==== Resolution ====
On 11 November 2011, labor and management reached an agreement, allowing Kim Jin-sook to end her 309-day occupation of crane No. 85. A sixth and final Hope Bus was held at 5:30pm on 19 June at Cheonghak Waterside Park in Busan, with 200 supporters, including 60 former Hanjin Heavy Industries employees, present. The purpose of the final Hope Bus was merely to thank the supporters, and thus did not attract police intervention.

=== Philippines ===
Protests were also leveled at the Subic Bay manufacturing facilities of Hanjin Heavy Industries, organized by members of local Filipino labor and Catholic groups on 20 March and 29 March 2011. The protests were organized due to reports of 31 deaths due to industrial accidents since 2007, as well as a labor group claiming 11 cases of illegal work, 63 cases of illegal layoffs, and 23 cases of job suspension.

On 3 July 2011, a Filipino Hope Bus was organized. The Filipino Hope Bus piggybacked on the previous energy of the unrelated 20 March and 29 March demonstrations, while drawing inspiration from the first Hope Bus demonstration on 11 June.

== Legacy ==
Starting from 1 February 2013, it took 22 days of negotiations to arrange a 15.8 billion won settlement between Hanjin Heavy Industries management and the labor union due to the death of a laborer. As of 1 December 2013, five Hanjin Heavy Industries workers had separately committed suicide since the resolution of the 2010-11 labor dispute.
