= Jungang-dong =

Jungang-dong may refer to

- Jungang-dong, Masanhappo-gu, an administrative division in Changwon, South Korea
- Jungang-dong, Busan, an administrative division of Jung District, Busan, South Korea
