= Busan Sunrise Festival =

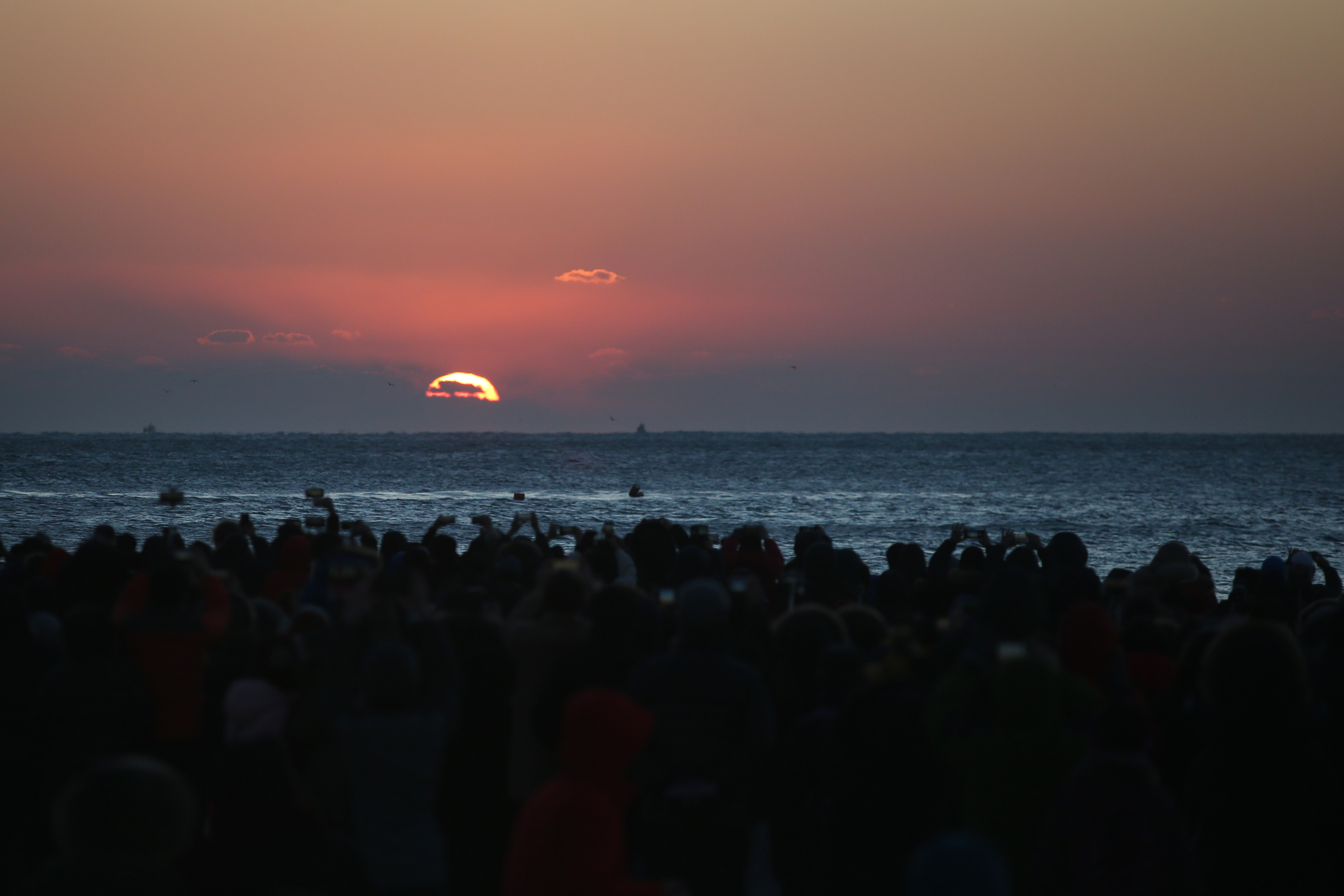
Busan Sunrise Festival

The Busan Sunrise Festival (Korean: 부산해맞이축제; RR: Busan Haemaji Chukje) is an annual event held in Busan, South Korea.

== History ==
The Busan Sunrise Festival was conceived in 1999 to promote Busan as a "metropolis of cosmopolitan culture and tourism". In order to spread awareness of the inaugural event, the Busan Metropolitan City Government and Busan Cultural Festival Promotion Association invited public participation throughout April to select an official promotional poster.

A bell toll ritual occurs in Yongdusan Park on December 31 followed by the observance of the sunrise on Haeundae Beach on January 1.
