= 40-step stairway =

Historic stairway in Busan, South Korea

- Stairway
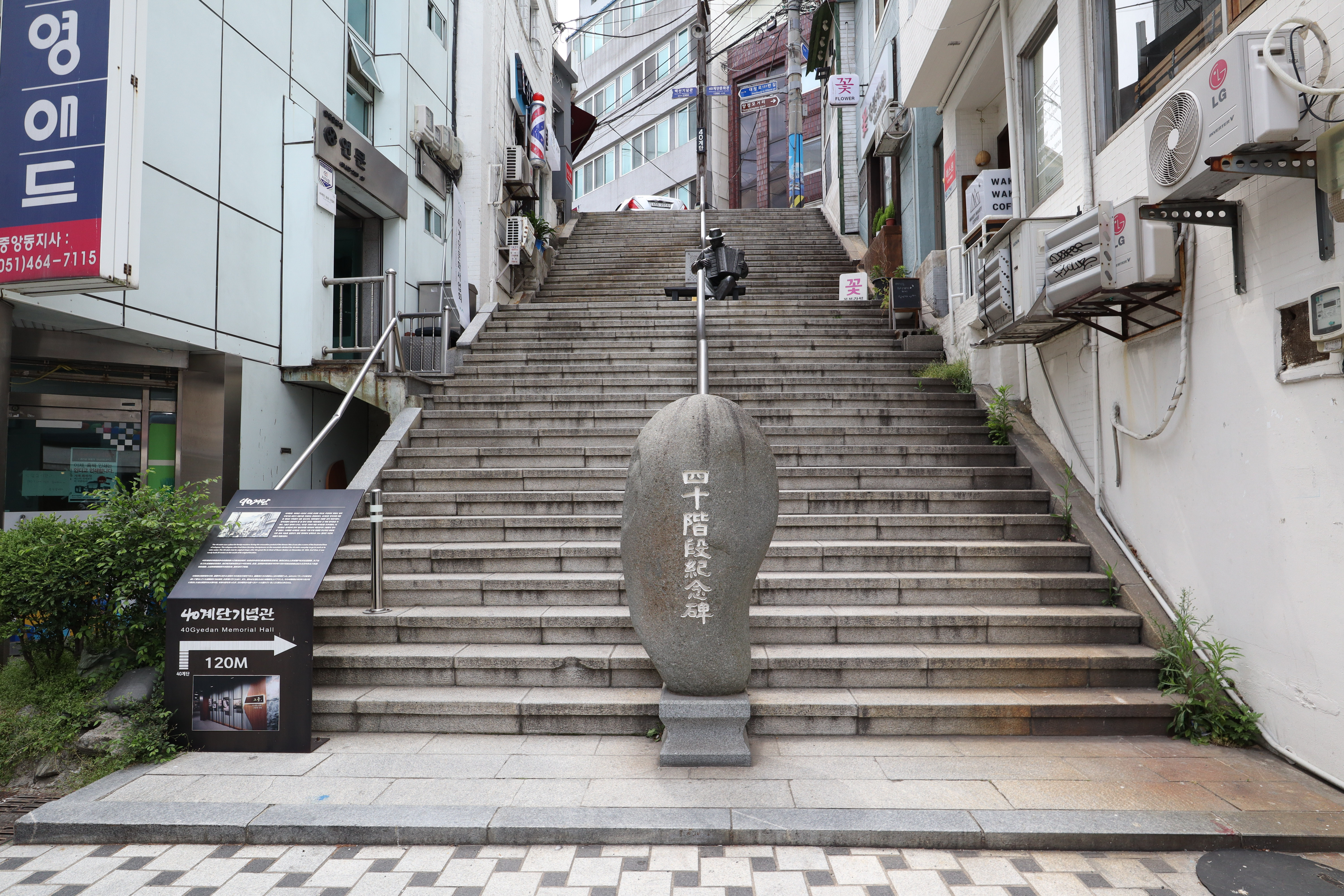
- The stairway (2020)
- Steps: 40
- Address: 39-51 1-ga, Jungang-dong, Jung District, Busan, South Korea
- Interactive map of 40-step stairway
- Coordinates: 35.1039°N 129.0345°E

The 40-step stairway (Korean: 40계단; lit. '40 stairway') is a famous stairway in Jungang-dong, Jung District, Busan, South Korea.

The stairway is accessible via a 5 minute walk from Exit 11 of Jungang Station on the Busan Metro Line 1.

== Description ==
The staircase was built between 1909 and 1912. The steps were originally around 25 m (82 ft) away from their current location; they were relocated at some point. At some point, the stairs were made to be only about 1 m (3.3 ft) wide, as the surrounding residential area grew. During the 1950–1953 Korean War, refugees escaping the conflict formed a shanty town around the staircase. It became famous as a marketplace for the refugees. It also served as a landmark that families would agree to meet at to reunify.

In 1993, a monument stone was constructed in front of the staircase. In 2004, the area around the staircase was made into a tourist street and renovated. There is an exhibition hall that shows the history of the area and the staircase.

The 40–step stairway appears in the film Nowhere to Hide.

== Gallery ==
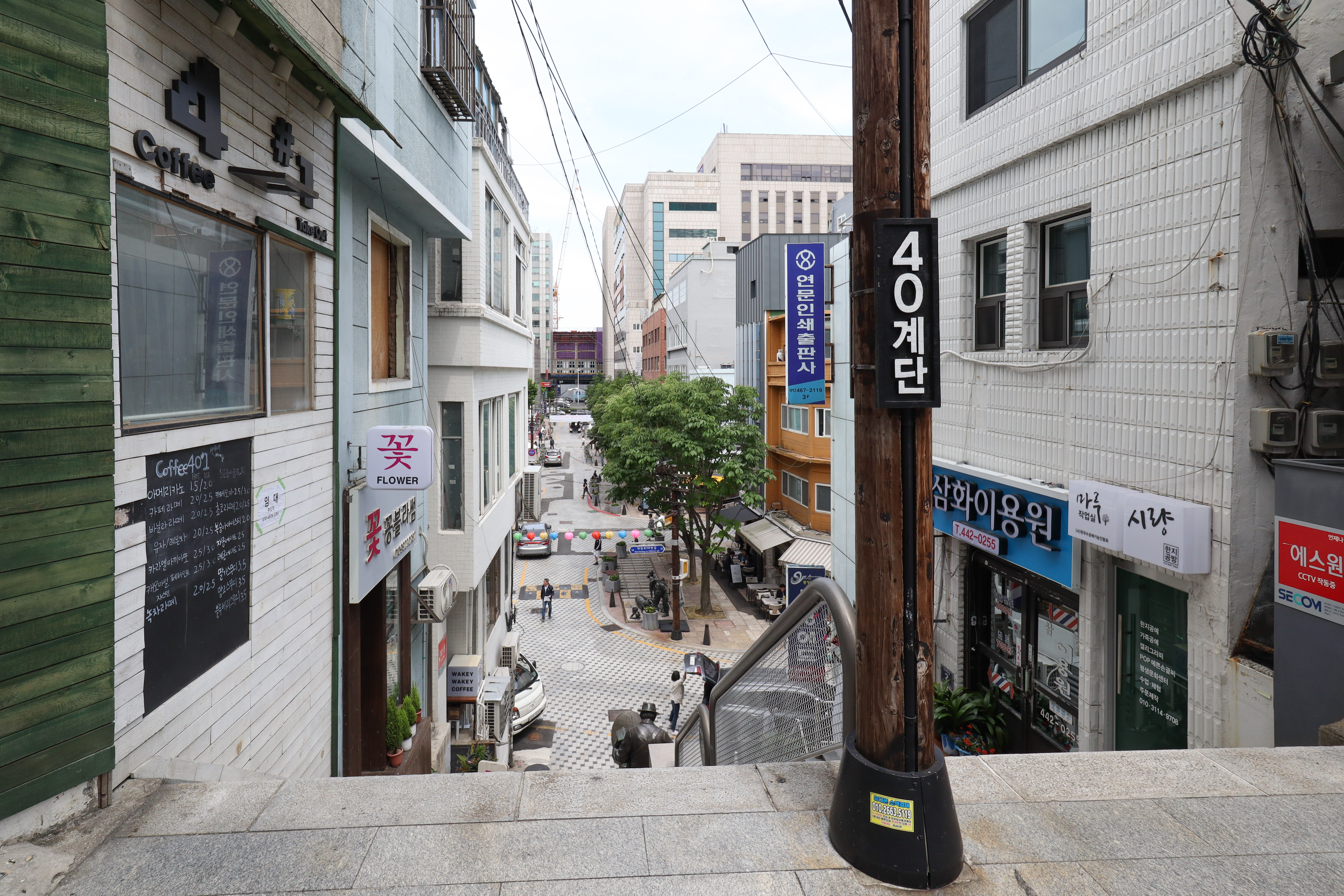
View from the top (2020)

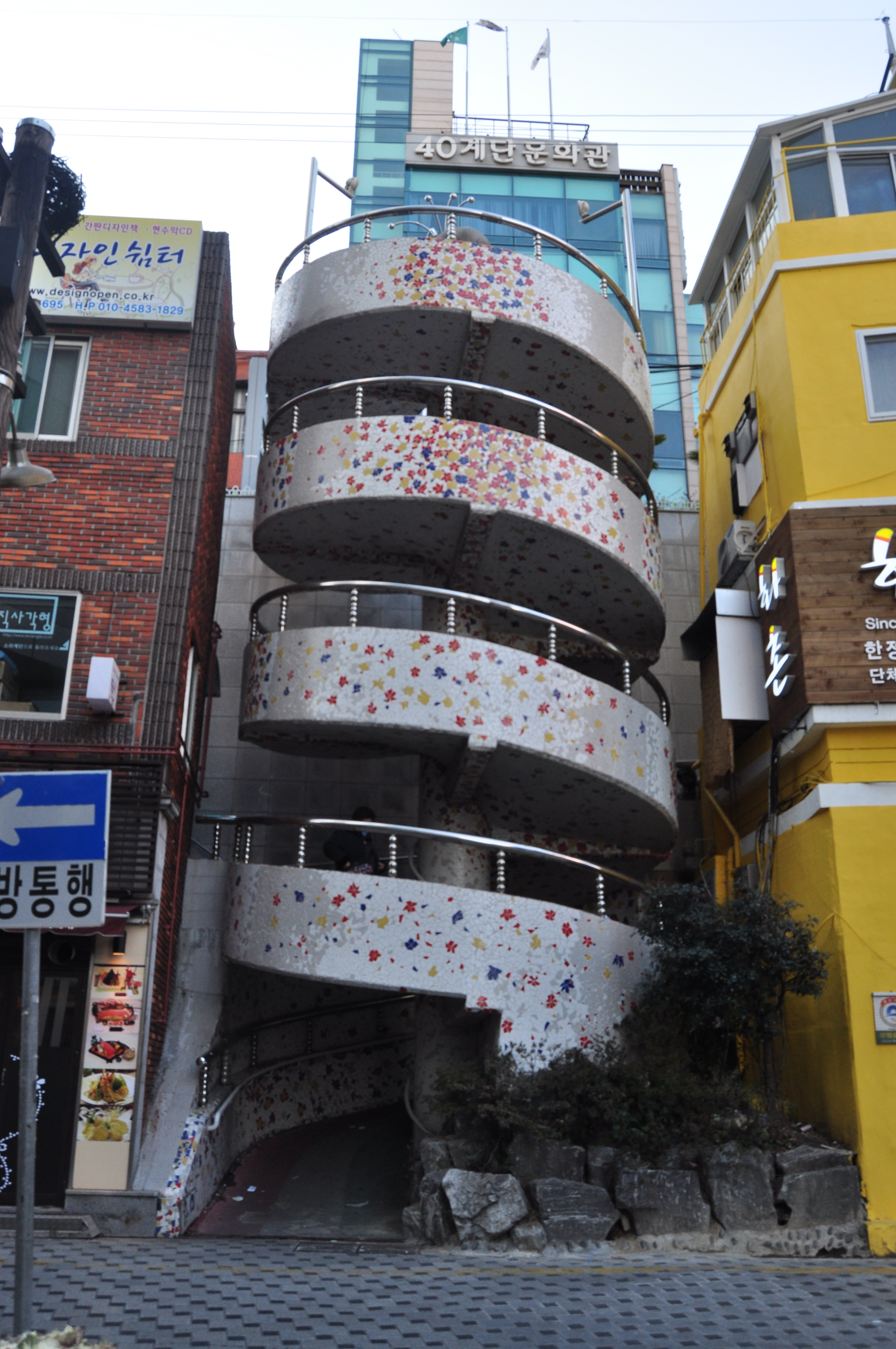
A decorative staircase nearby on the themed street (2013)
