= Bosu Book Street =

Shopping street in Busan, South Korea

Coordinates: 35.103125°N 129.027461°E

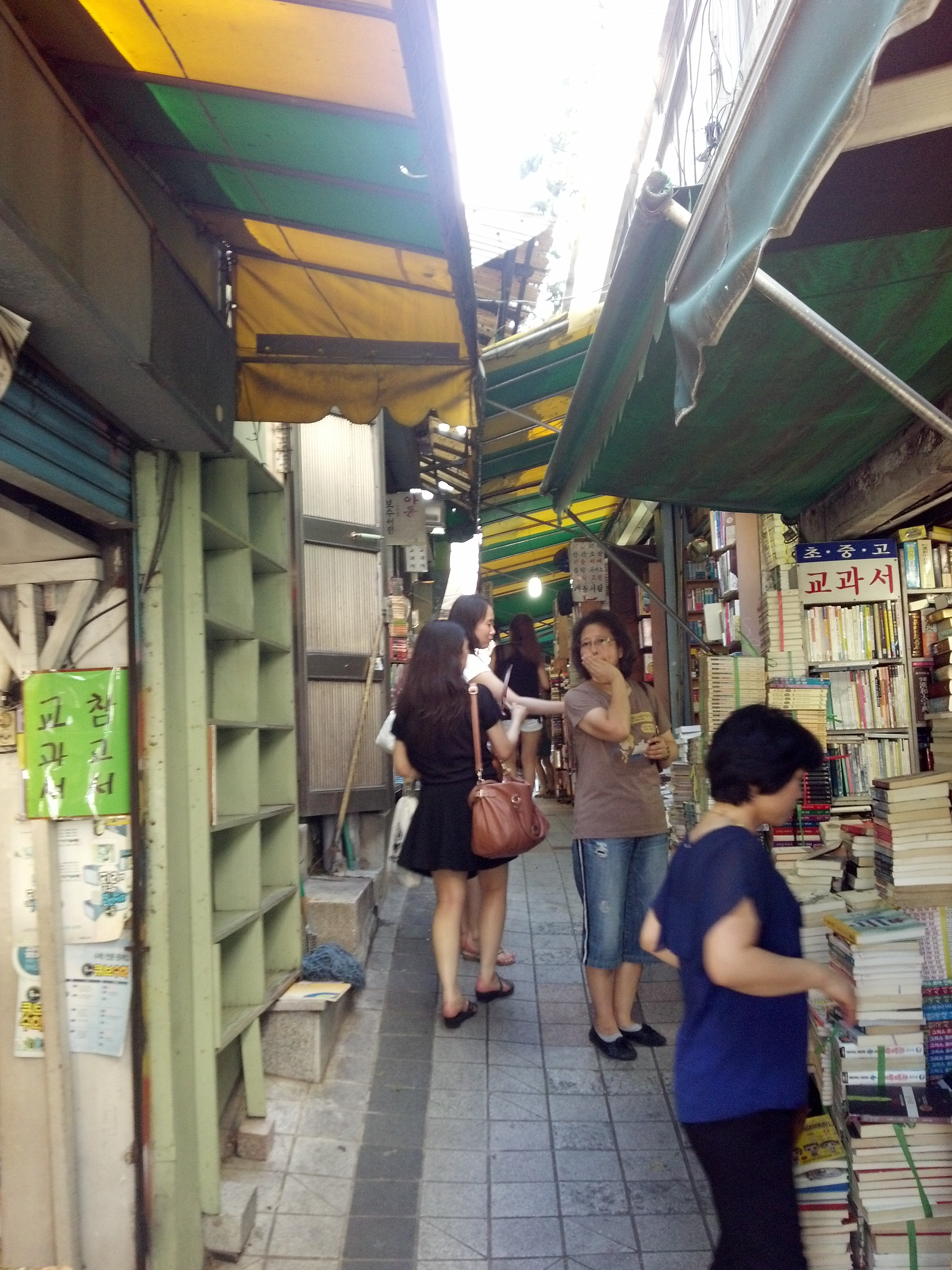
Bosu Book Street

Bosu Book Street (Korean: 보수동 책방골목; Hanja: 寶水洞 冊房-) is the book street in Bosu-dong, Jung District, Busan, South Korea. Bosu Book Street has a lot of bookstores.
