= Busan Tower =

Skyscraper in Busan, South Korea

Coordinates: 35°6′4.39″N 129°1′56.26″E

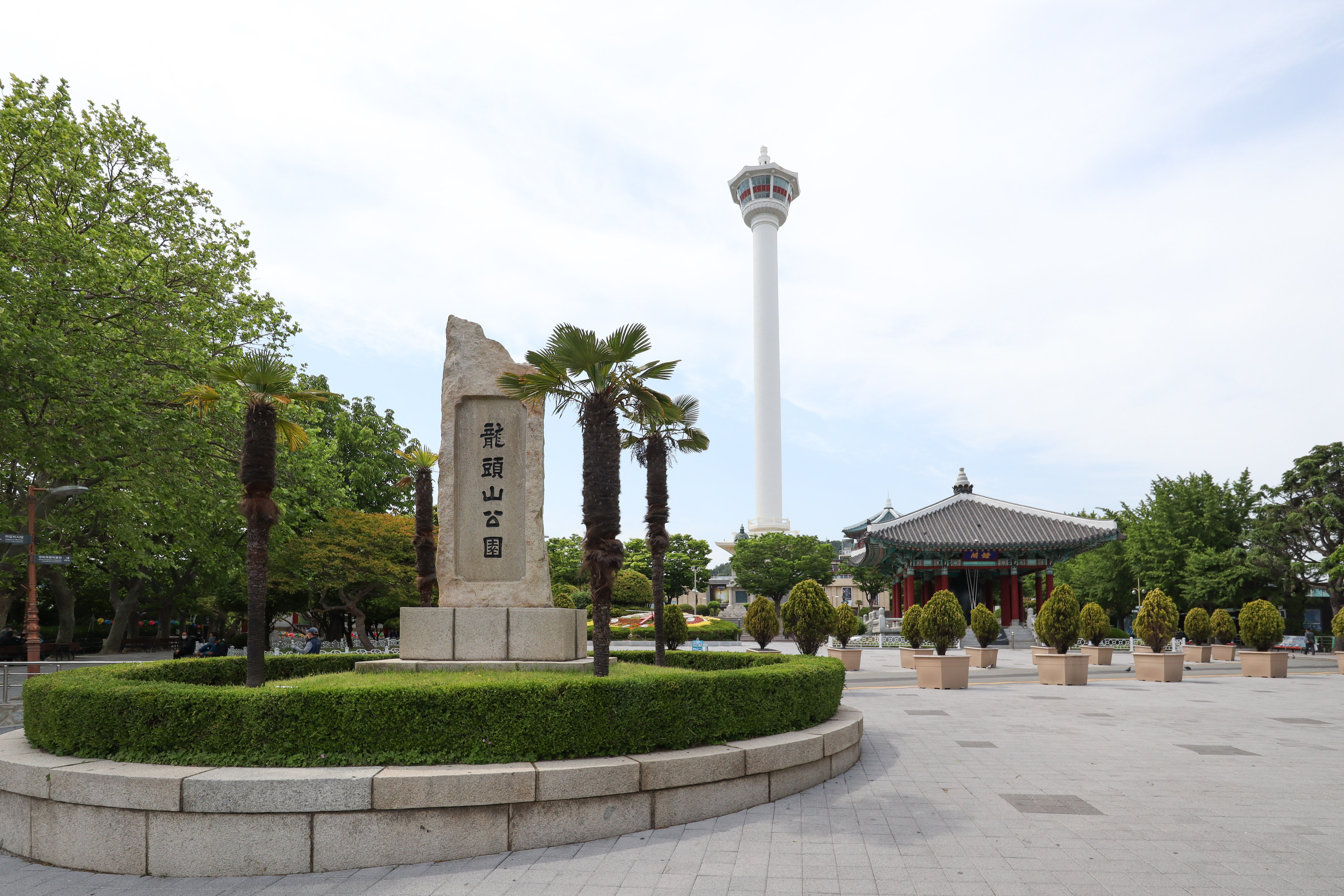
- View of the tower from Yongdusan Park
- Interactive map of Busan Tower
- Height: 120 m (390 ft)

Busan Tower (Korean: 부산타워) is a 120-metre-high tower at Yongdusan Park, located in Jung District, Busan, South Korea.

It was built in 1973. It is only used for entertainment purposes and doesn't have any transmitting equipment. The deck features panoramic view and a small cafe, only accessible during working hours via two high-speed elevators. The base of the tower is interconnected with a few galleries and souvenir shops. The tower is usually mentioned in tourist guides as a good place to get a view of the city's port.

== Gallery ==

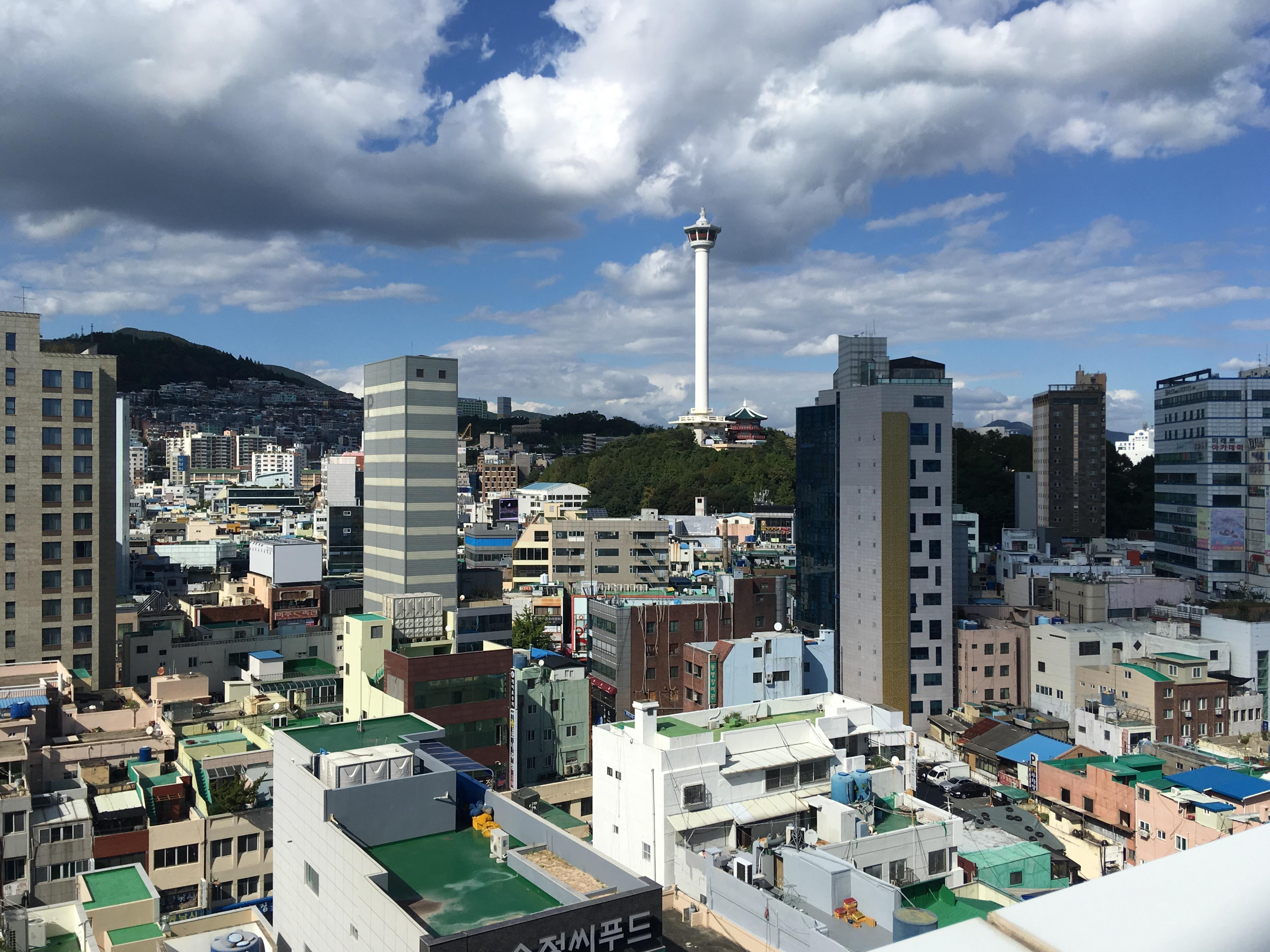
Cityscape

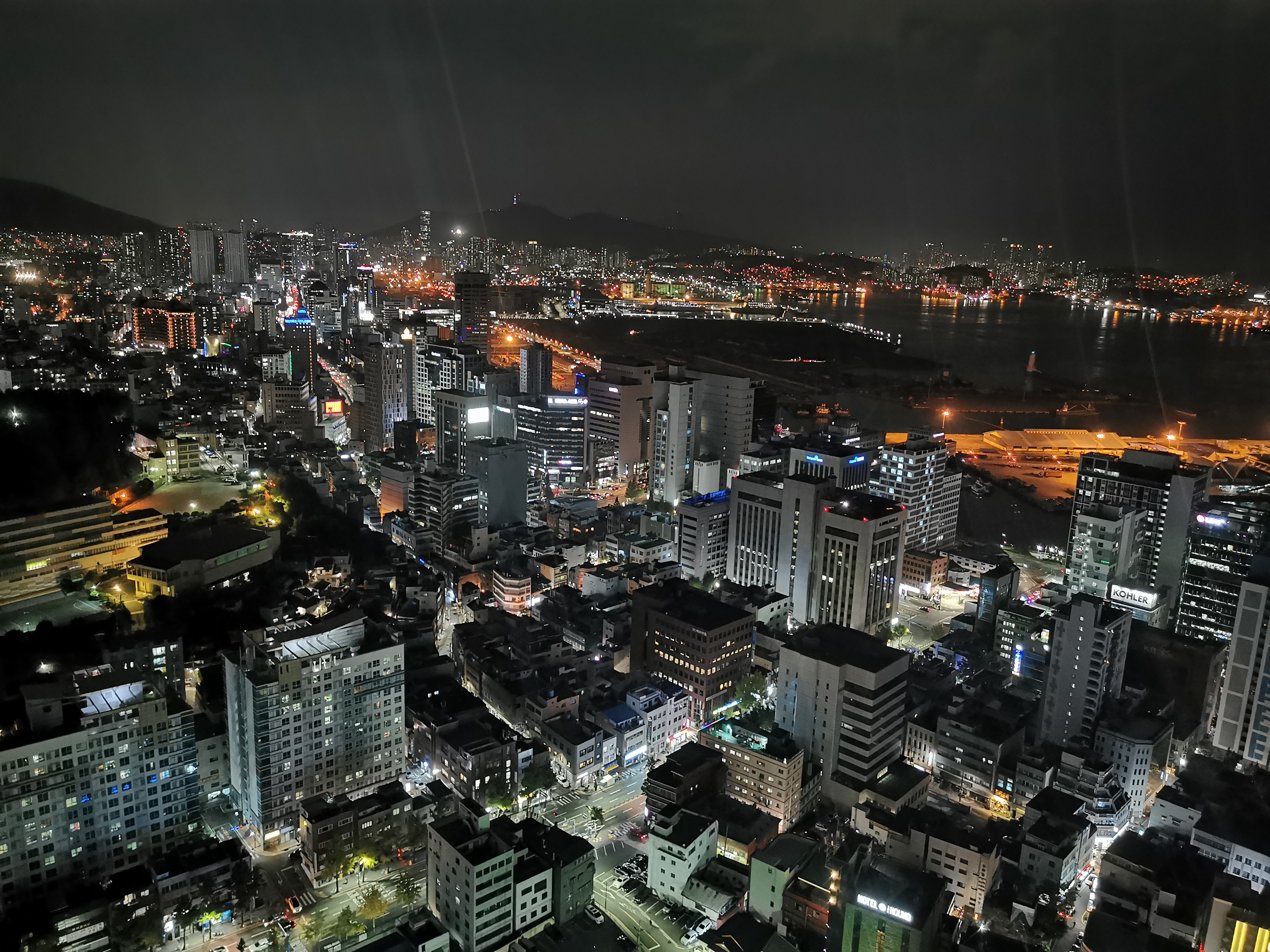
View from the tower at night

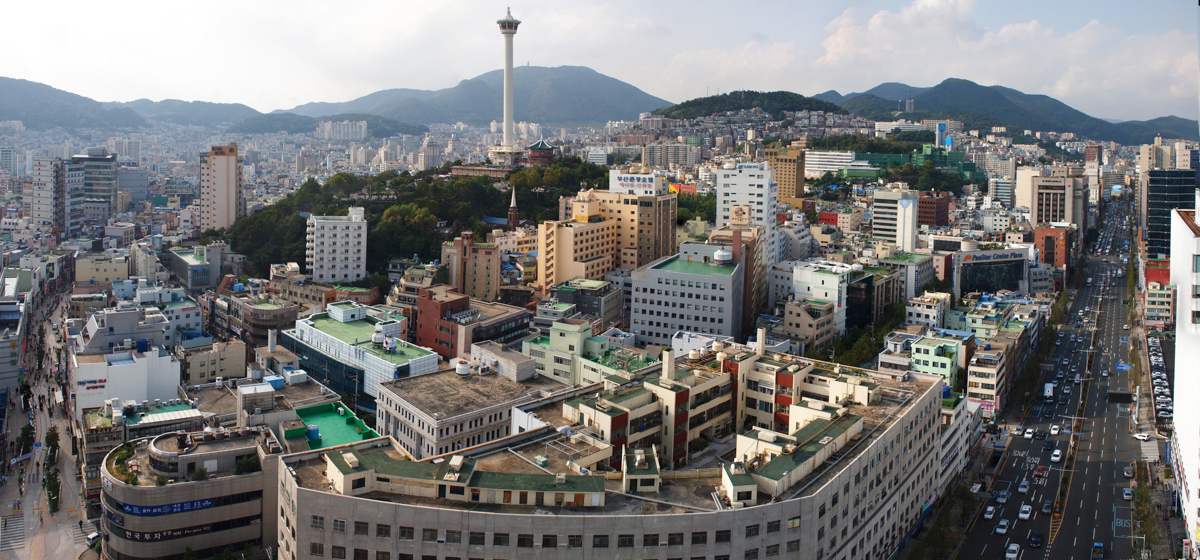
Another cityscape

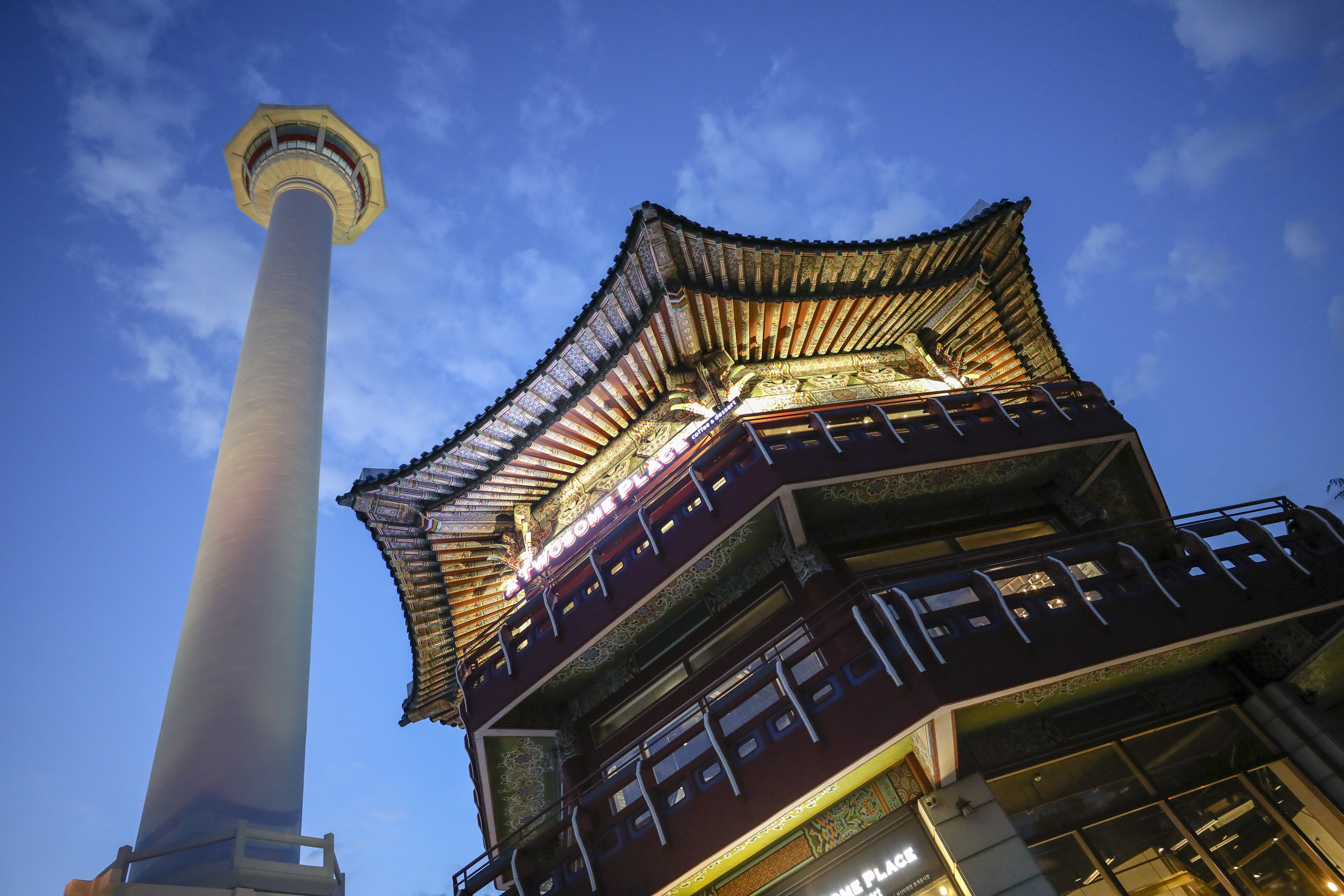
From bottom of the tower
Panorama of Busan from Busan Tower
