= Yeongdo Bridge =

Bridge in Busan, South Korea

Coordinates: 35°05′44″N 129°02′12″E

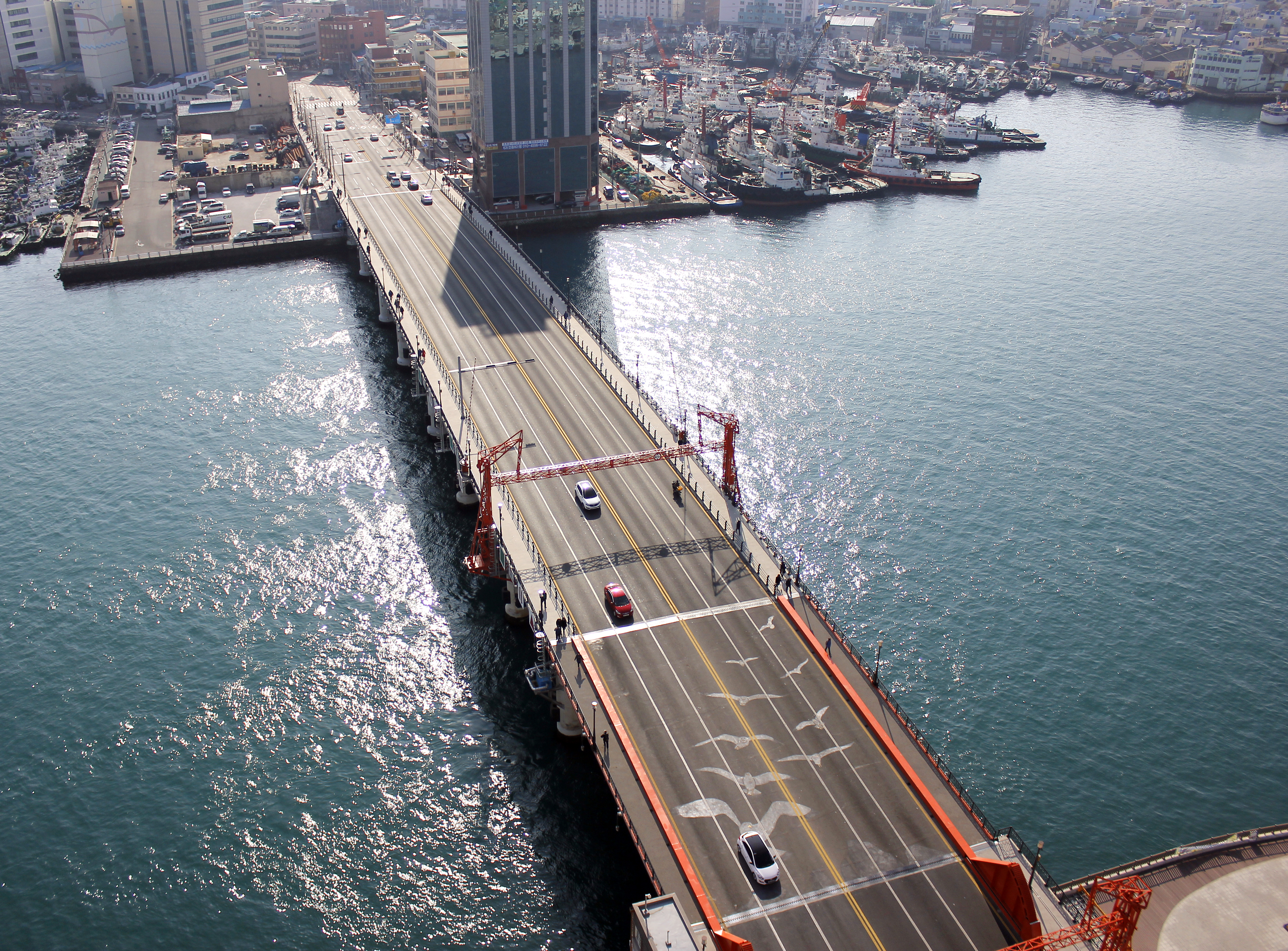
Yeongdo Bridge

Yeongdodaegyo (Korean: 영도대교, IPA: [jəːŋdodɛgjoː]) A.K.A. Yeongdodari (Korean: 영도다리, IPA: [jəːŋdodari]) is a bascule bridge in Yeongdo, Busan, Republic of Korea. It is also called Yeongdo Bridge in English. Completed in 1934, it connects Jung District ward on Busan mainland to Yeongdo District on the Yeongdo Island spanning the south port of Busan. During the Korean War, the bridge served as a site where people went to find lost family members and friends. The original drawbridge stopped functioning in 1966. It was deemed dangerous in 2003 and almost torn down, but was ultimately designated a historical monument. The drawbridge was restored and re-opened on November 27, 2013.
