= Busan Bridge =

Bridge in Busan, South Korea

Coordinates: 35.0962°N 129.0387°E

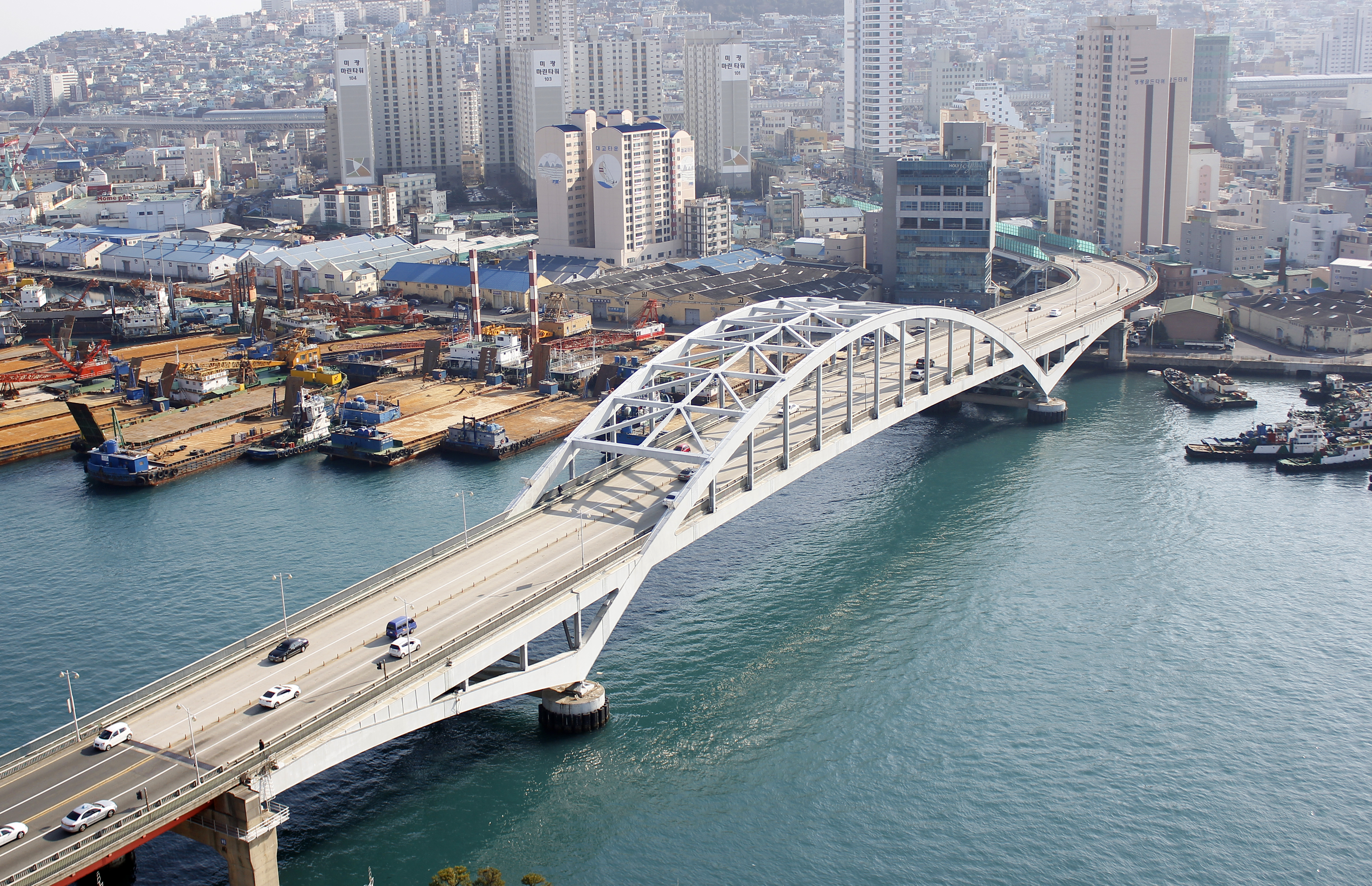

Korean name
- Hangul: 부산대교
- Hanja: 釜山大橋
- RR: Busan daegyo
- MR: Pusan taegyo

Busandaegyo is a bridge in Busan, South Korea. The bridge connects the districts of Yeongdo District and Jung District.

The bridge was completed in 1980.
