= Jung District, Busan =

District in South Korea

Coordinates: 35°06′09″N 129°02′06″E

Jung
- Autonomous District
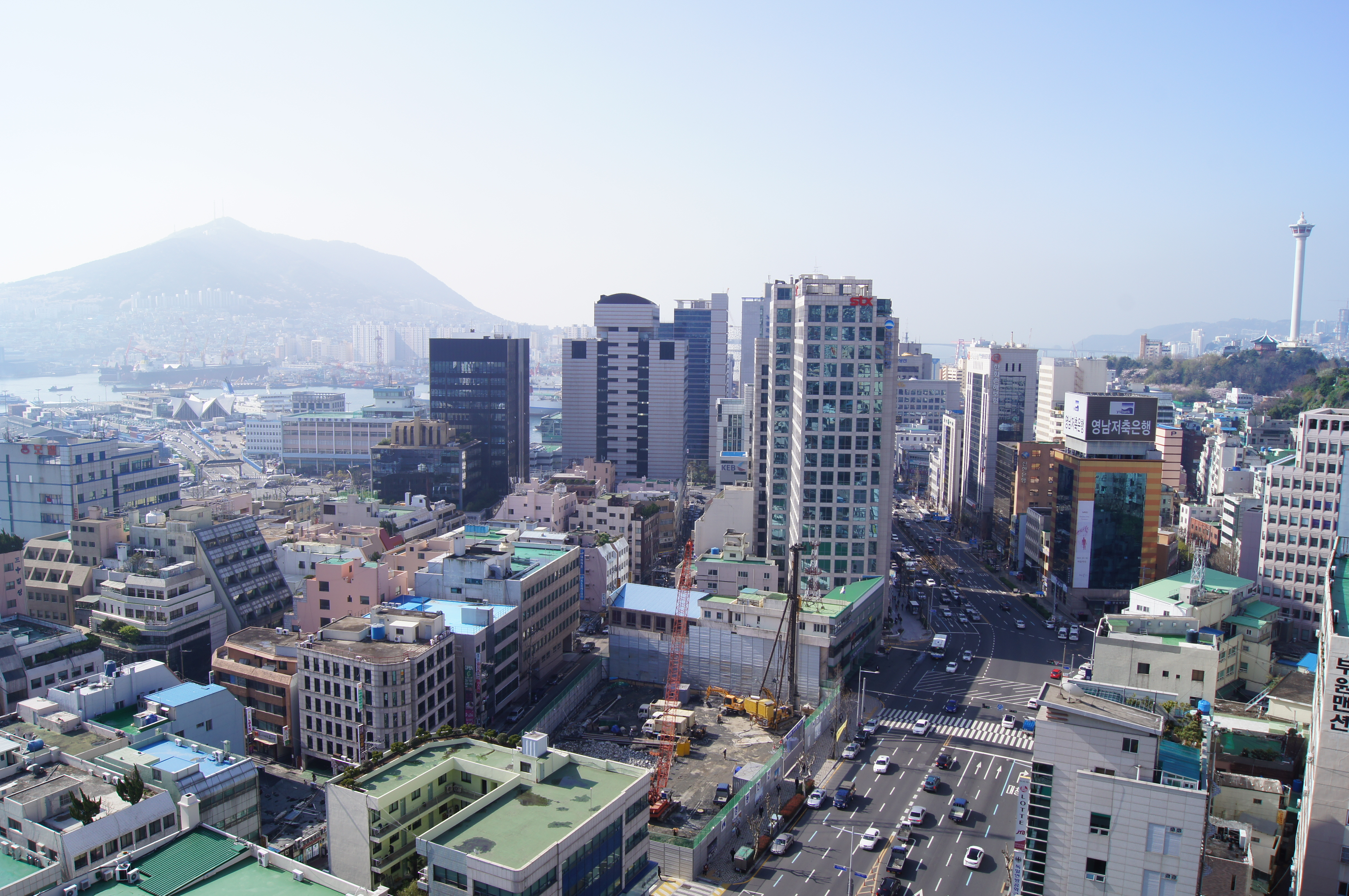

- Flag

- Country: South Korea
- Region: Yeongnam
- Provincial level: Busan
- Administrative divisions: 9 administrative dong

Government
  - Mayor: Choi Jin-bong (최진봉)

Area
  - Total: 2.83 km^{2} (1.09 sq mi)

Population (2025)
  - Total: 36,936
  - Density: 13,100/km^{2} (33,800/sq mi)
  - Dialect: Gyeongsang
- Website: Jung District office

Korean name
- Hangul: 중구
- Hanja: 中區
- RR: Jung-gu
- MR: Chung-gu

Jung District (Korean: 중구; lit. 'Central District') is a gu in southern central Busan, South Korea. It has an area of 2.8 km² and a population of about 48,000.

== Administrative divisions ==
Administrative divisions

Jung-gu is divided into eight legal dong, which altogether comprise nine administrative dong, as follows:

- Jungang-dong
- Donggwang-dong
- Daecheong-dong
- Bosu-dong
- Bupyong-dong
- Gwangbok-dong
- Nampo-dong
- Yeongju-dong (two administrative dong)

== Landmarks ==
- Jagalchi Market
- Gukje Market
- Busan Tower
- Yongdusan Park
- 40-step stairway
- Yeongdo bridge
- Busan bridge
- Bosu book street

== Cityscape ==
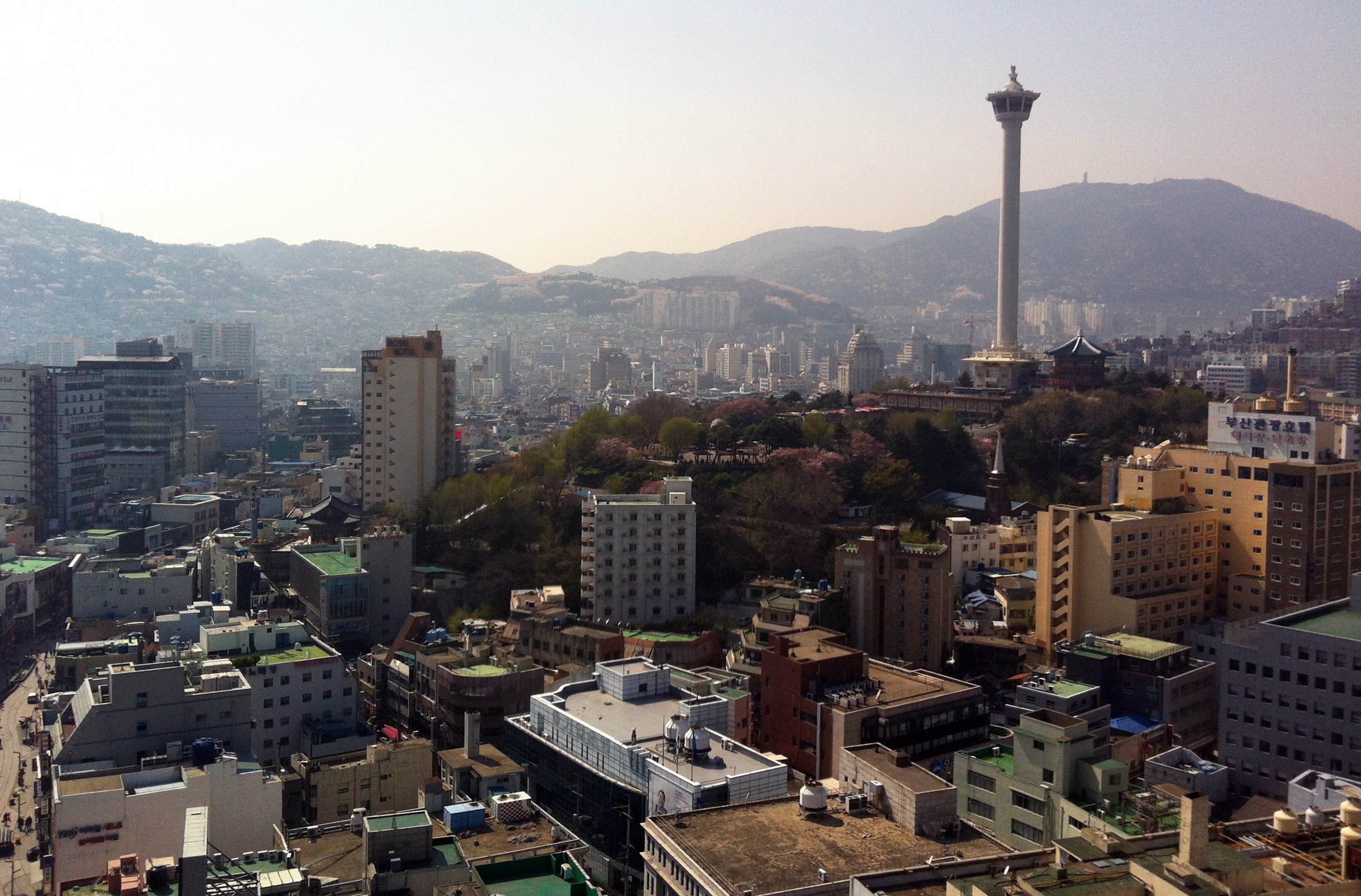

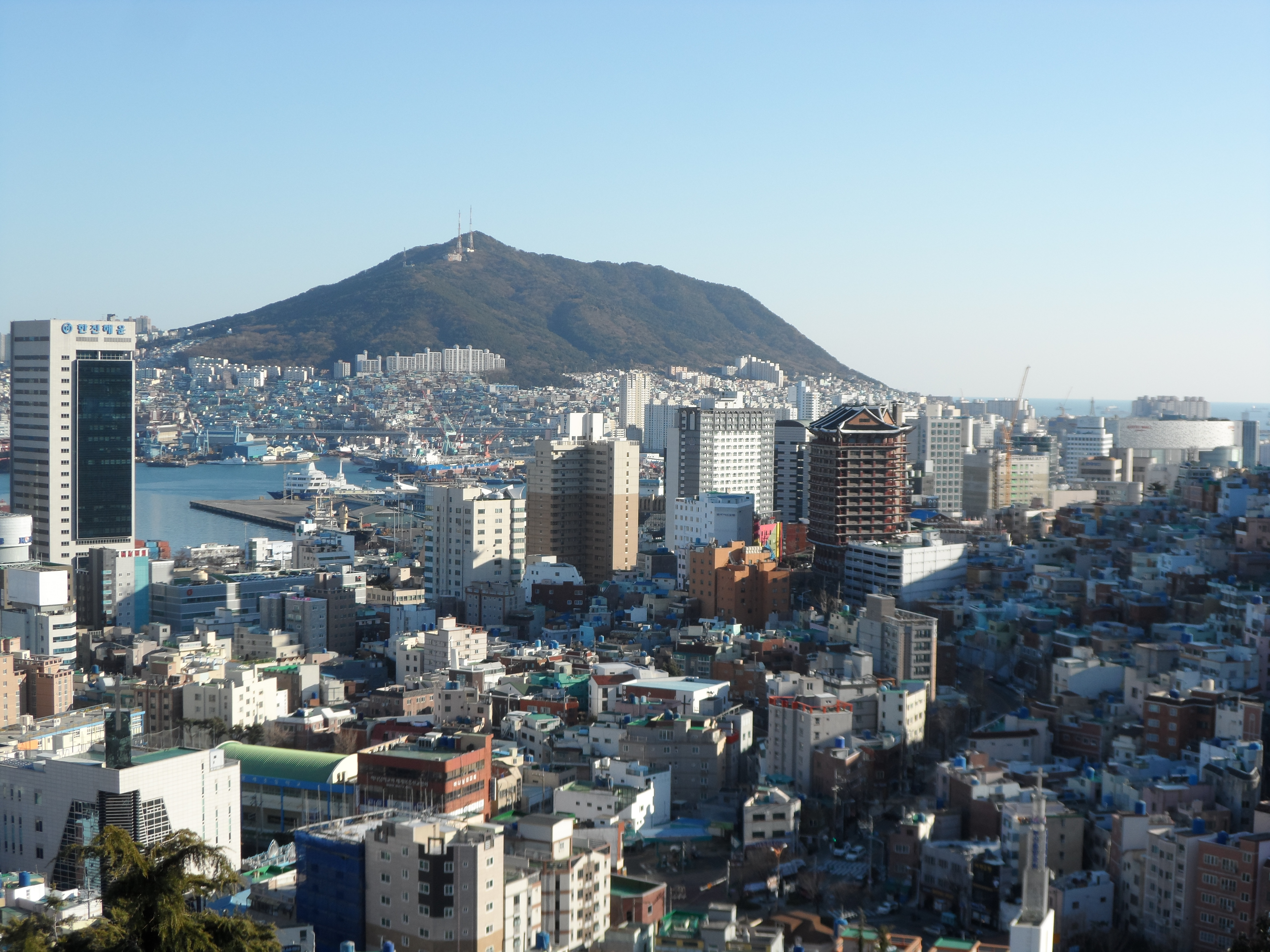

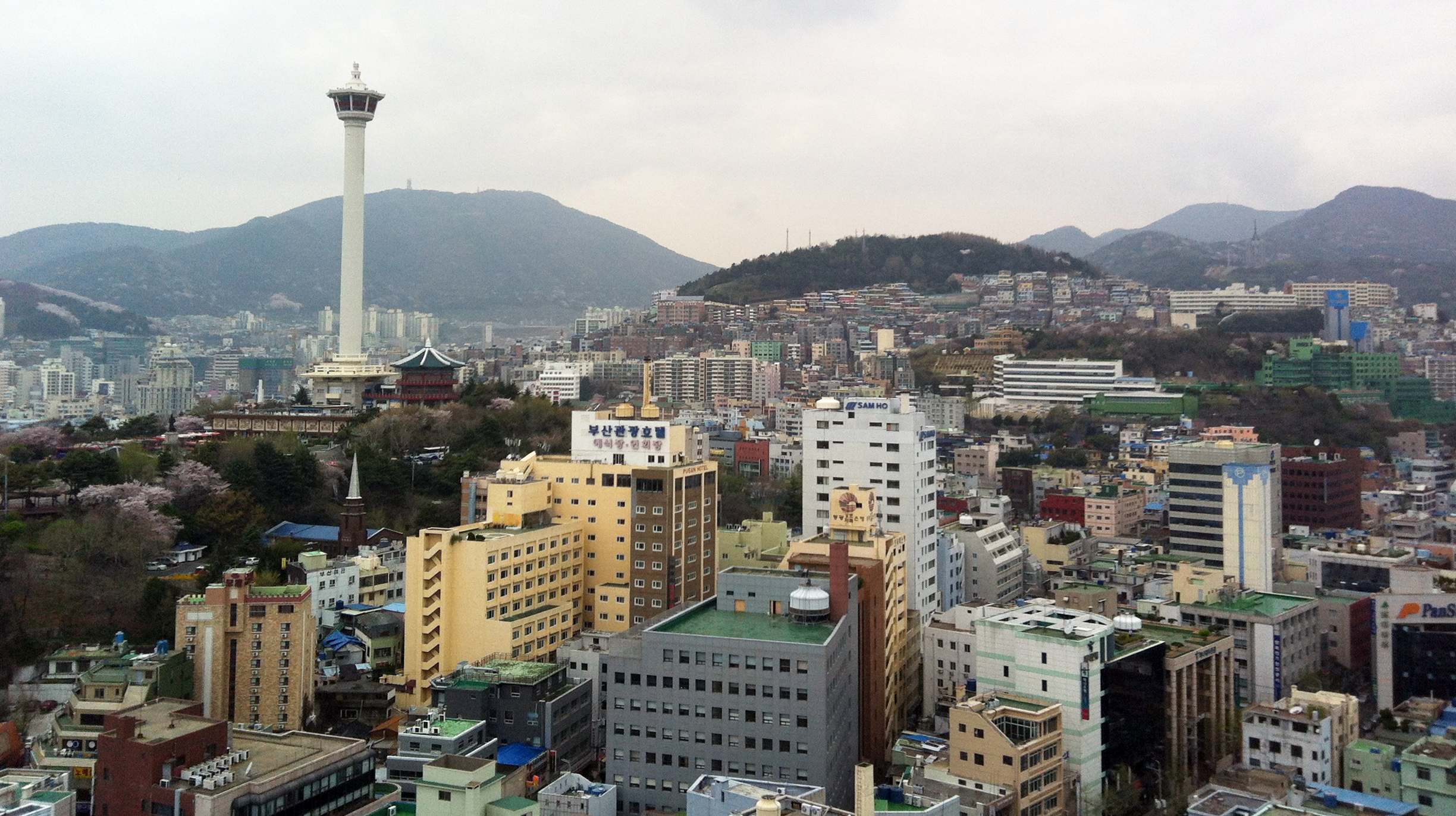

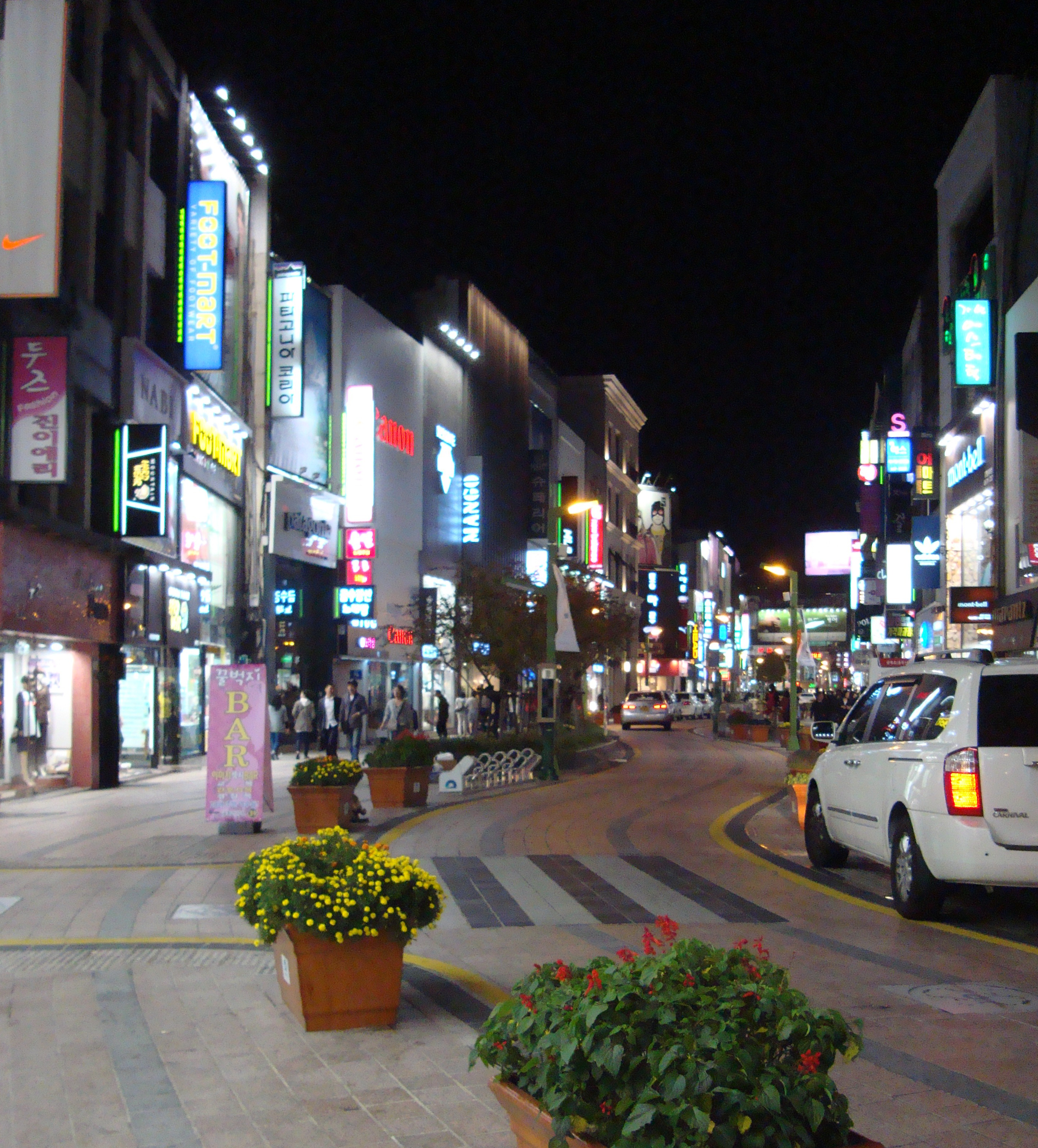
Gwangbok-dong

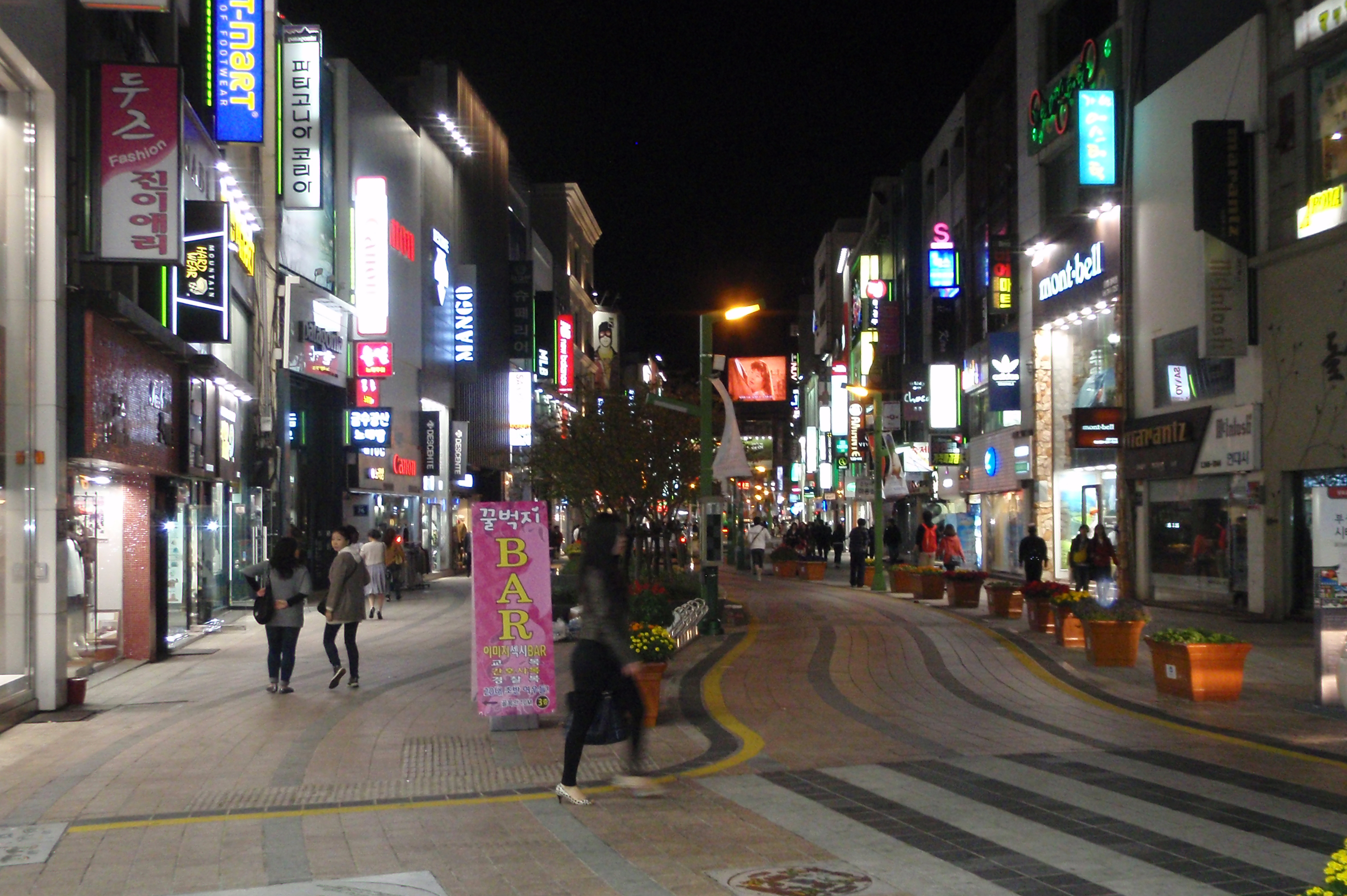
