= Yongdusan Park =

Park in Busan, South Korea

Yongdusan park
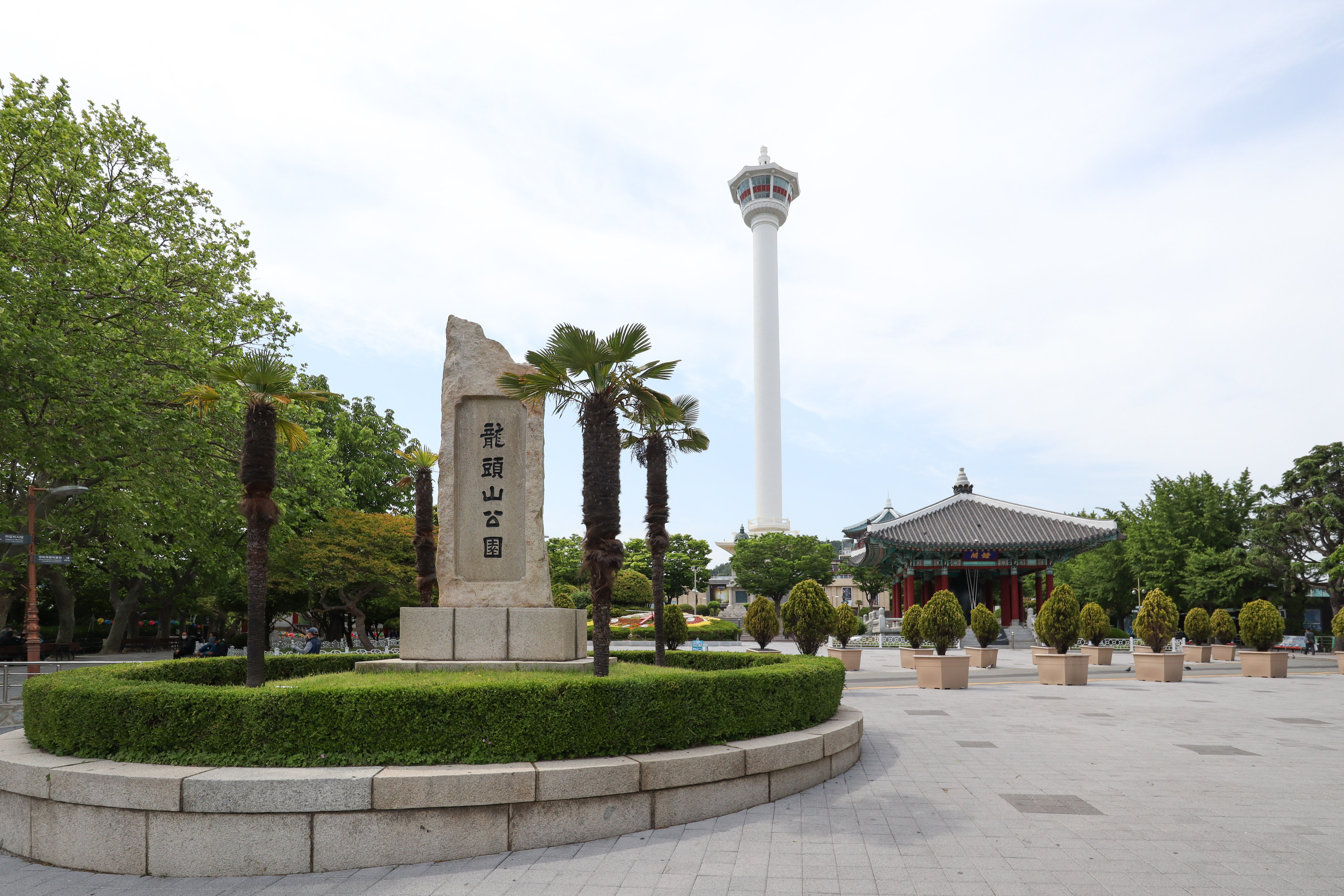
- The park, with Busan Tower in background (2020)
- Interactive map of Yongdusan park
- Location: Jung District, Busan, South Korea
- Coordinates: 35°06′02″N 129°01′58″E
- Area: 6.9 hectares (17 acres)
- Etymology: Dragon's Head Mountain
- Website: www.bisco.or.kr/yongdusanpark/ (in Korean)

Korean name
- Hangul: 용두산공원
- Hanja: 龍頭山公園
- RR: Yongdusan gongwon
- MR: Yongdusan kongwŏn

Yongdusan Park (Korean: 용두산공원) is a park located in Jung District, Busan, South Korea. The 120-meter-high Busan Tower is located here.

The park is located on a mountain, Yongdusan. The mountain previously went by the name Songhyeonsan, and the park was briefly named Unam Park. The park occupies an area of 69,000 square meters (740,000 ft^{2}). It has 70 different species of trees growing in it.

The park has been witness to significant history especially during the 20th century, and has since been considered a symbol of Busan. It formerly hosted a waegwan (Japanese ethnic enclave) during the Joseon period, Ryūtōsan Shrine between the 17th and 20th centuries, and shanty towns of refugees during the Korean War. Many of these structures were destroyed by a number of fires. Now, a number of historical monuments and attractions are densely packed in the park, which has an elevated and scenic view of Busan.

== Etymology ==
The park is located on the mountain Yongdusan. The mountain has also previously been called Songhyeonsan (송현산; 松峴山; lit. 'Pine Hill Mountain'), in reference to the numerous pine trees that dotted the mountain. In 1955, the park was renamed Unam Park (우남공원; 雩南公園), after the art name of the first President of South Korea, Syngman Rhee. However, the name of the park was changed back after Rhee was ousted in the 1960 April Revolution.

Yongdu means "dragon's head" and san means "mountain". The name is an allusion to the similarity of the mountain park, which is said to resemble the head of a dragon which symbolically protected Busan from wokou (Japanese maritime raiders).

== Features ==
One of the highlights of the Yongdusan Park is the statue of Yi Sun-sin, Korea's 16th-century naval hero. The park also has a bust of writer Ahn Huijae. There is also the commemorative monument for the April 19th anti-government student protests. The most conspicuous of the park's feature is the Busan Tower.

=== Museum of World Folk Instruments ===
The park also contains the Museum of World Folk Instruments. The museum is housed in a two-story building and contains exhibits various musical instruments, including instruments made from fruits, human knee bones and, it's said, rat skin. The unique feature of the museum is that visitors are allowed to handle and play the instruments on display.

=== Exhibition Hall of World Model Boats ===
Another attraction at the park is the Exhibition Hall of World Model Boats. The exhibit contains over 80 models of traditional Korean yellow-hemp sailboats and turtle ships as well as those of the costliest luxury cruise ships and some of the most sophisticated warships.

=== Arts Performance ===
The park turns into a festival site every Saturday at 3 pm onward as a traditional arts performance is held there. The performances are held from March through November.

=== Attractions ===
- Busan Tower
- Palgakjeong (Octagonal Pavilion)
- Statue of Yi Sun-sin
- Buddhist temple
- Memorial to the April Revolution

== History ==
The park was once host to a waegwan (Japanese ethnic enclave) during the Joseon period. During the Japanese colonial period, Ryūtōsan Shrine was constructed in the park. Soon after the liberation of Korea in 1945, the shrine was destroyed with fire, although the fire spread to the nearby trees, which left the mountain charred. During the Korean War, the mountain became crowded with shanty towns of refugees fleeing the fighting. Due to the haphazard conditions, camps were destroyed by fire twice.

== Gallery ==
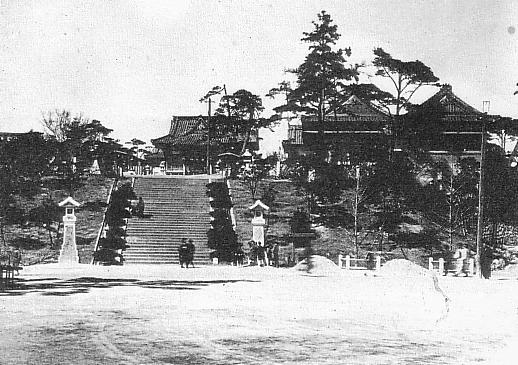
Ryūtōsan Shrine (c. 1930)

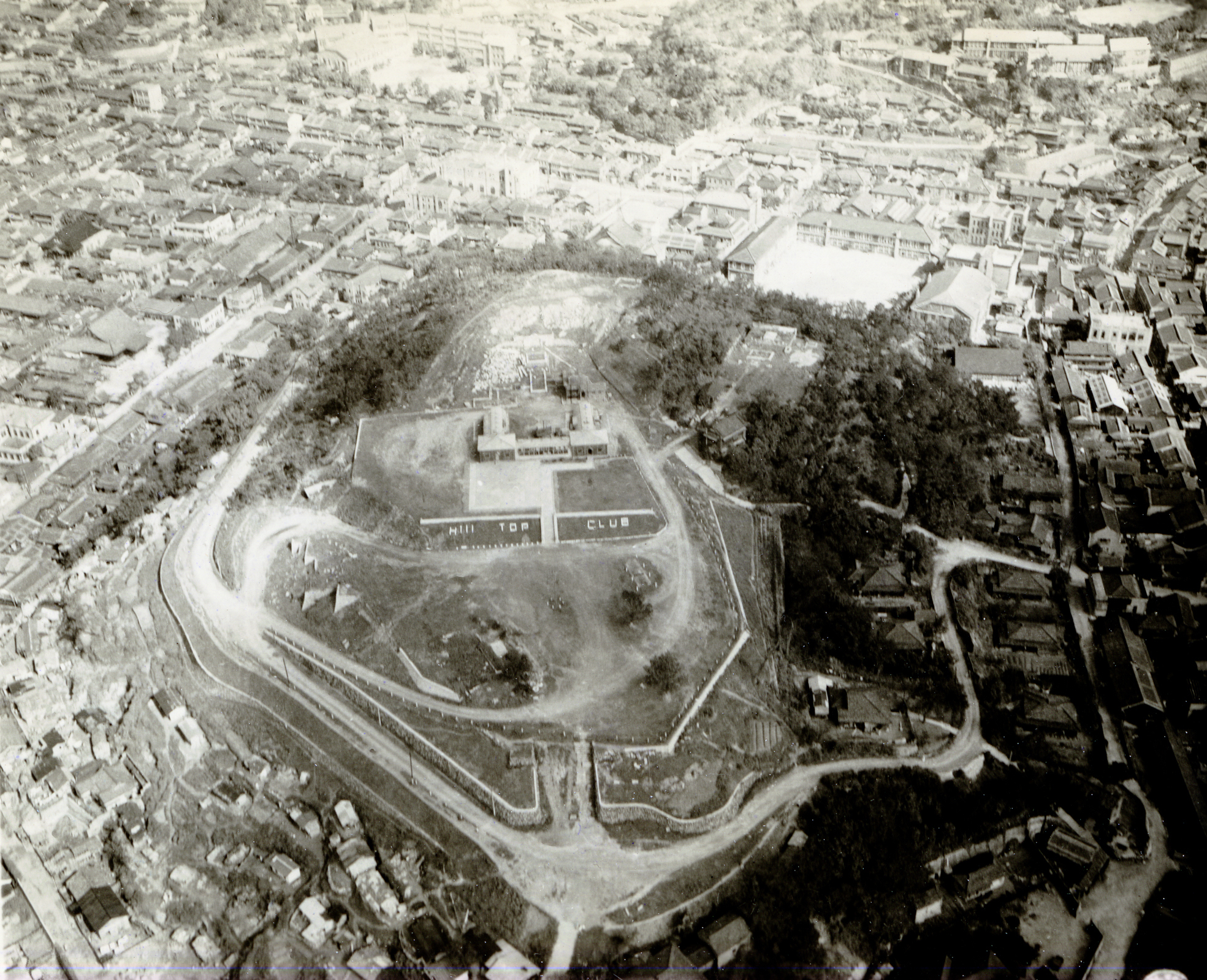
Aerial view of the park (1948)

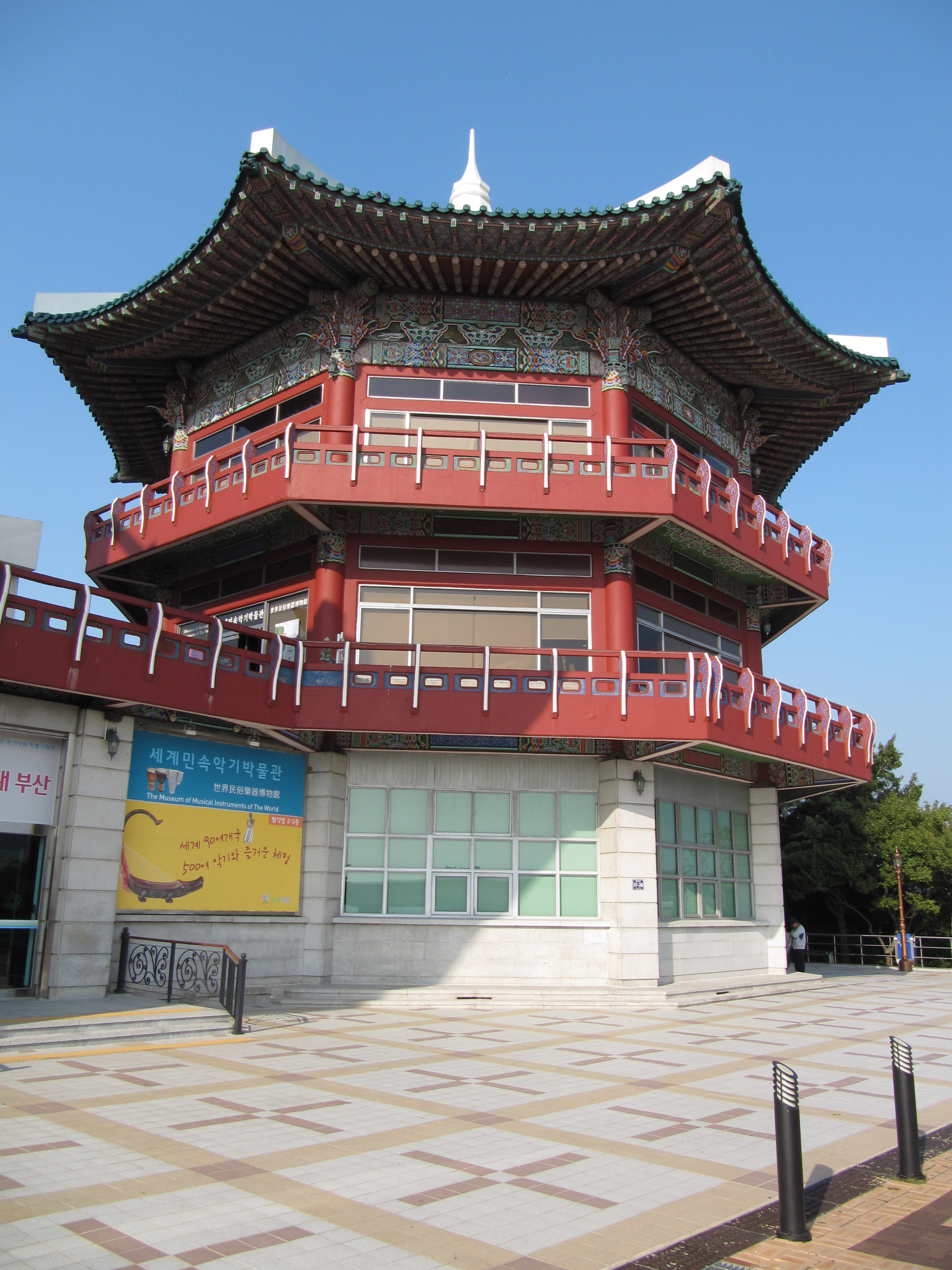
Museum next to Busan Tower (2010)

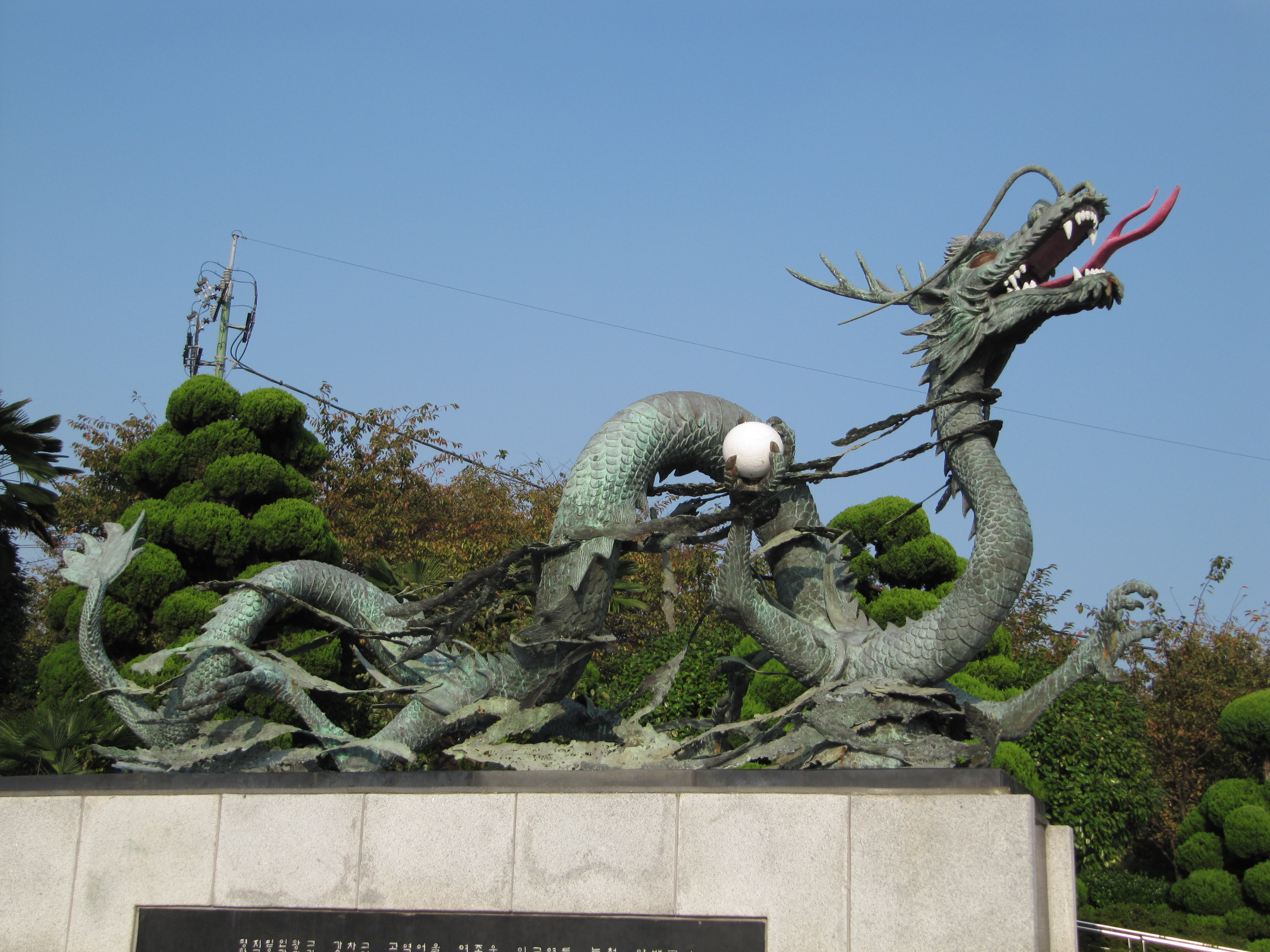
Statue of a dragon (2010)

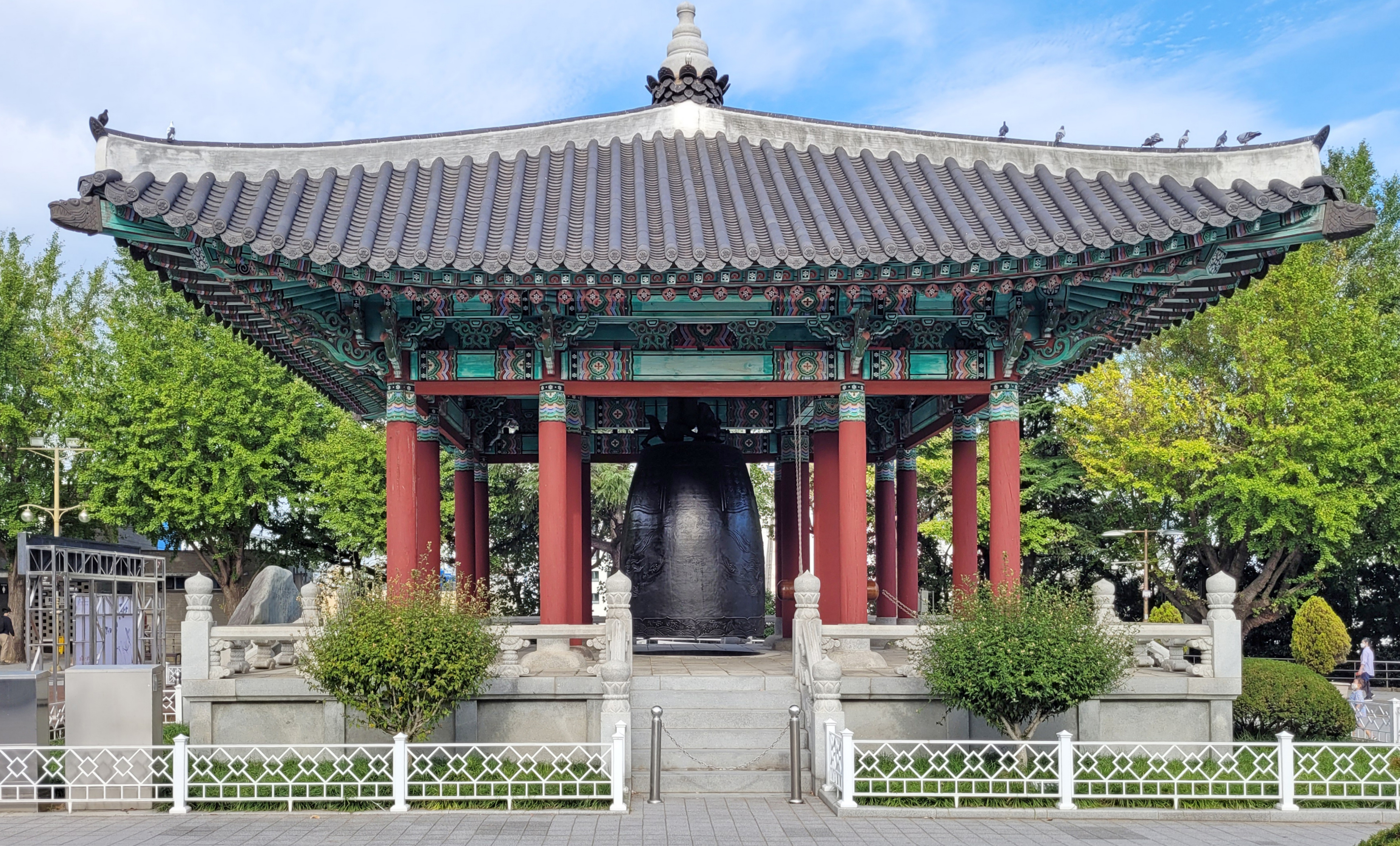
Bell of the Citizens Pavilion
