= Songjeong station (disambiguation) =

Songjeong station is a station on Seoul Subway Line 5 in Gangseo-gu, Seoul.

Songjeong station may also refer to:

- Songjeong station (Busan), in Busan, South Korea
- Gwangju Songjeong Station
- Gwangju Songjeong station (Gwangju Metro)
- Songjeong Park station
- Songjŏng station, on the Ch'ŏngnyŏn Ich'ŏn Line, North Korea
