= OSIRIA station =

Metro station in Busan, South Korea

오시리아; OSIRIA
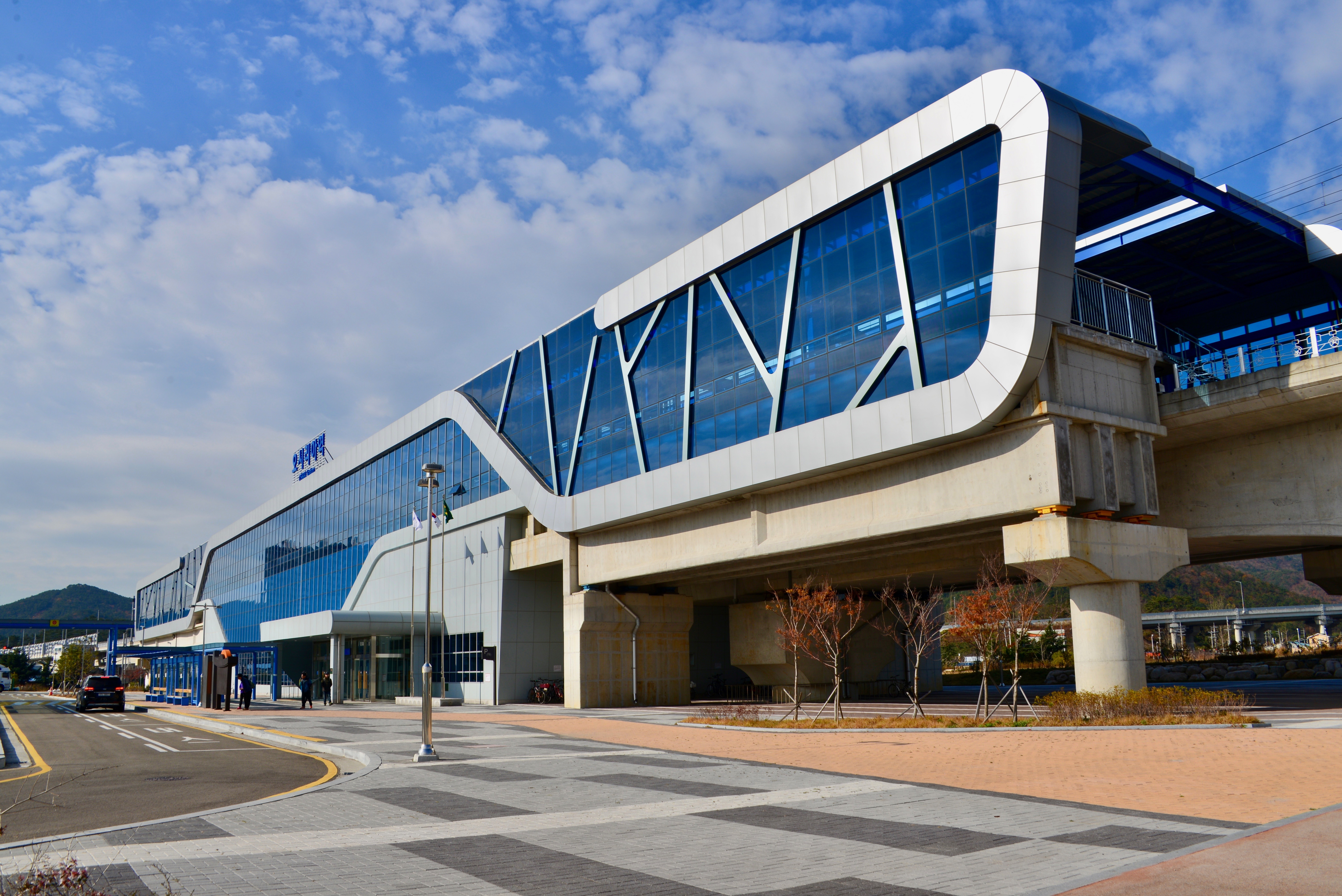

Korean name
- Hangul: 오시리아역
- Revised Romanization: Osiriayeok
- McCune–Reischauer: Osiriayŏk

General information
- Location: 14 Dongbusangwangwang 5-ro, Gijang-eup, Gijang County, Busan, South Korea; South Korea
- Coordinates: 35.19631°N 129.20836°E
- Operator: Korail
- Line: Donghae Line
- Platforms: 2
- Tracks: 2

Construction
- Structure type: Aboveground

History
- Opened: December 30, 2016

Services
Preceding station	Busan Metro	Following station
Songjeong towards Bujeon	Donghae Line	Gijang towards Taehwagang
Location
Location within Busan
Location within South Korea

OSIRIA station (Korean: 오시리아역) is a railway station of the Donghae Line in Gijang-eup, Gijang County, Busan, South Korea.

== Station layout ==
L2; Platforms	Side platform, doors will open on the left
L2; Platforms	Northbound	Donghae toward Taehwagang (Gijang)→
L2; Platforms	Southbound	← Donghae toward Bujeon (Songjeong)
L2; Platforms	Side platform, doors will open on the left

L1; Concourse	Lobby	Customer service, shops, vending machines, ATMs

G	Street level	Exit
