= Songjeong station (Busan) =

Train station in South Korea

송정; Songjeong
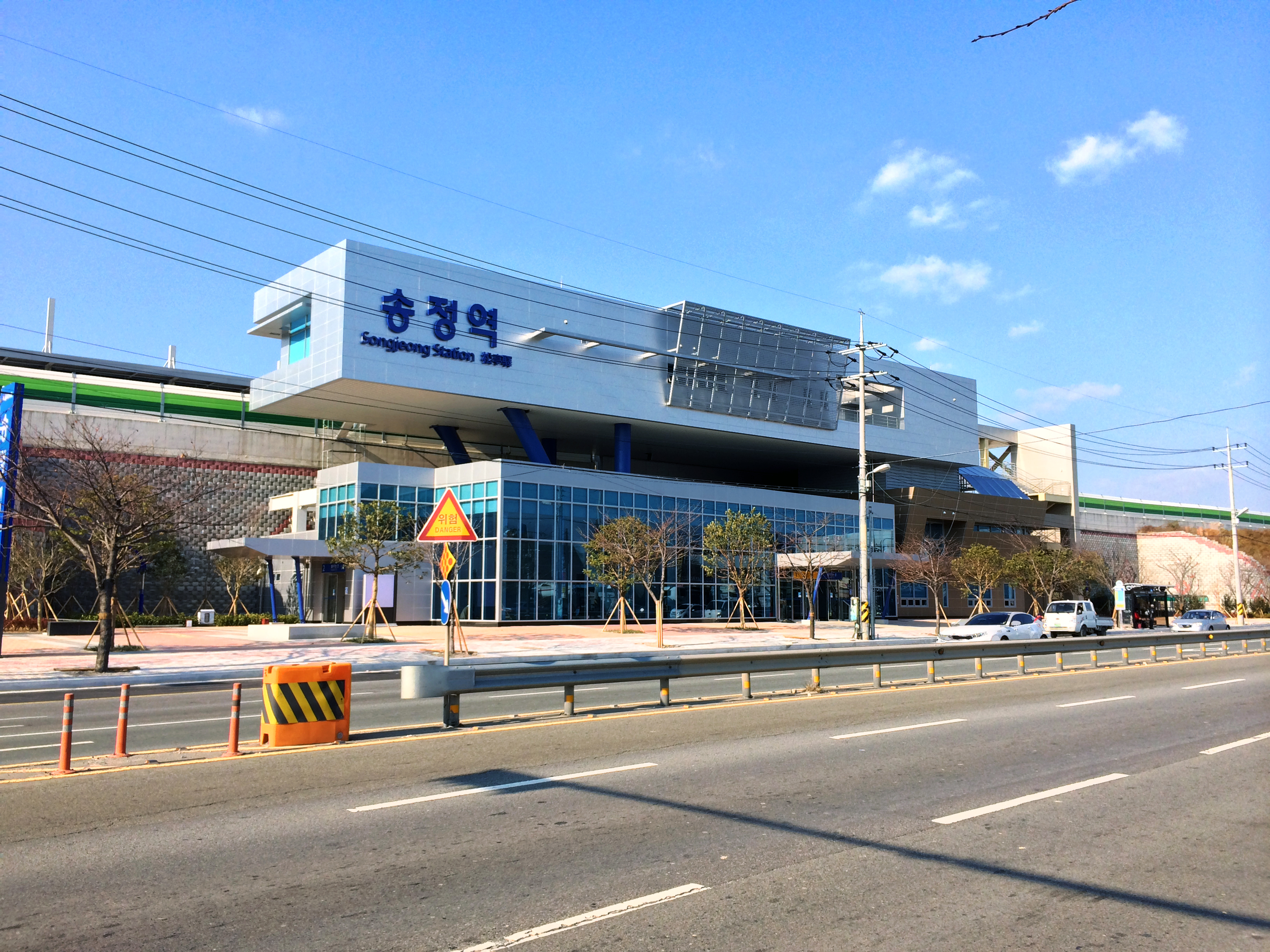

Korean name
- Hangul: 송정역
- Hanja: 松亭驛
- Revised Romanization: Songjeongyeok
- McCune–Reischauer: Songjŏngyŏk

General information
- Location: 1147 Haeun-daero, Haeundae District, Busan; South Korea
- Coordinates: 35°10′51.34″N 129°11′59.75″E
- Operator: Korail
- Line: Donghae Line
- Platforms: 2
- Tracks: 4

Construction
- Structure type: Aboveground

History
- Opened: December 16, 1934
- Rebuilt: 2010

Services
Preceding station	Busan Metro	Following station
Sinhaeundae towards Bujeon	Donghae Line	OSIRIA towards Taehwagang
Location

Songjeong station (Korean: 송정역; Hanja: 松亭驛) is a railway station of the Donghae Line in Songjeong-dong, Haeundae District, Busan, South Korea.

== History ==
The station was opened as a former part of Donghae Nambu Line. In 2013, due to the switch to the new line, all services transfer to the new location that opened on December 2, 2013.

== Station layout ==
L2; Platforms	Side platform, doors will open on the left
L2; Platforms	Northbound	Donghae toward Taehwagang (OSIRIA)→
L2; Platforms	Southbound	← Donghae toward Bujeon (Sinhaeundae)
L2; Platforms	Side platform, doors will open on the left

L1; Concourse	Lobby	Customer service, shops, vending machines, ATMs

G	Street level	Exit

== Gallery ==
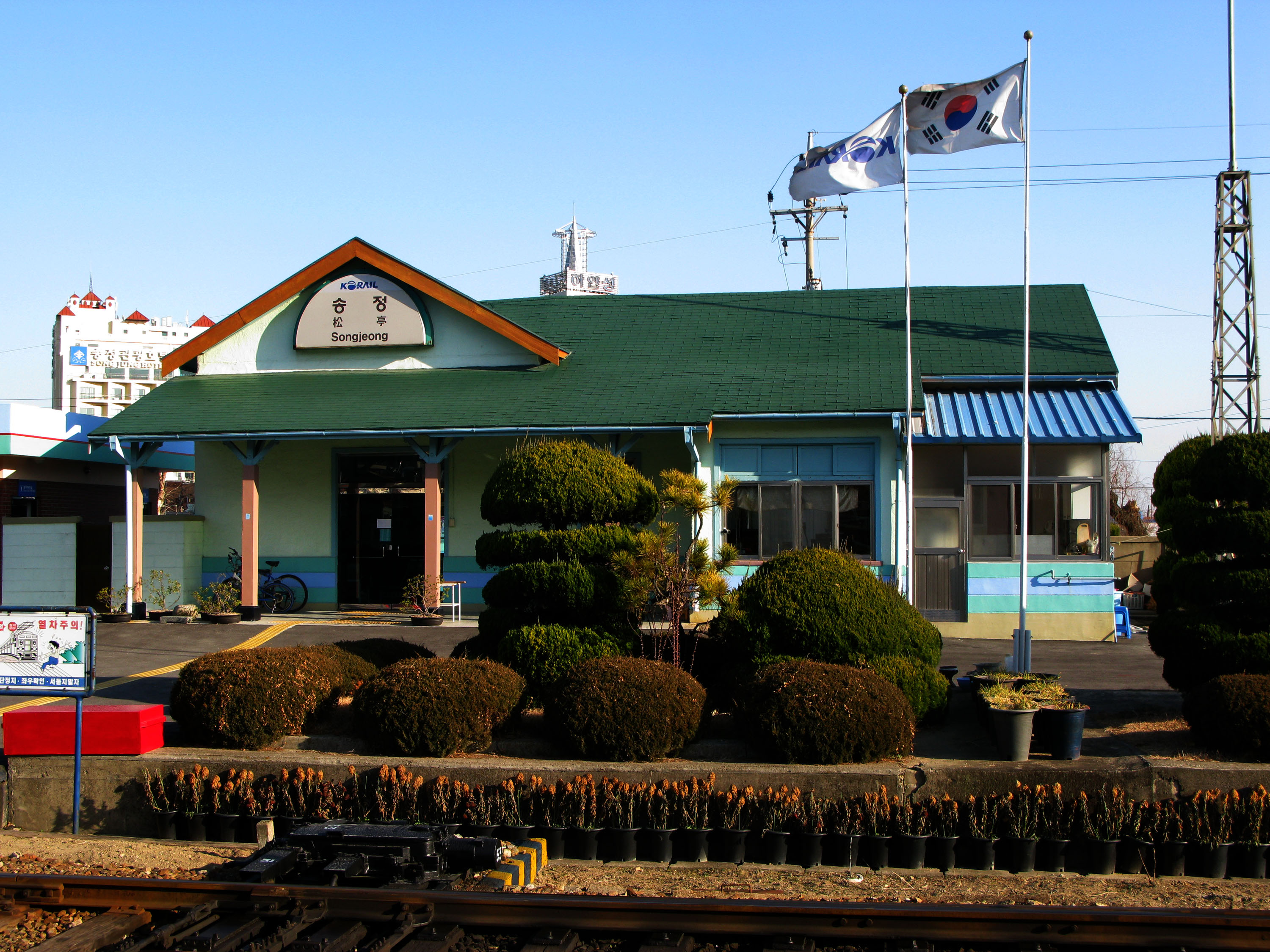
The old station

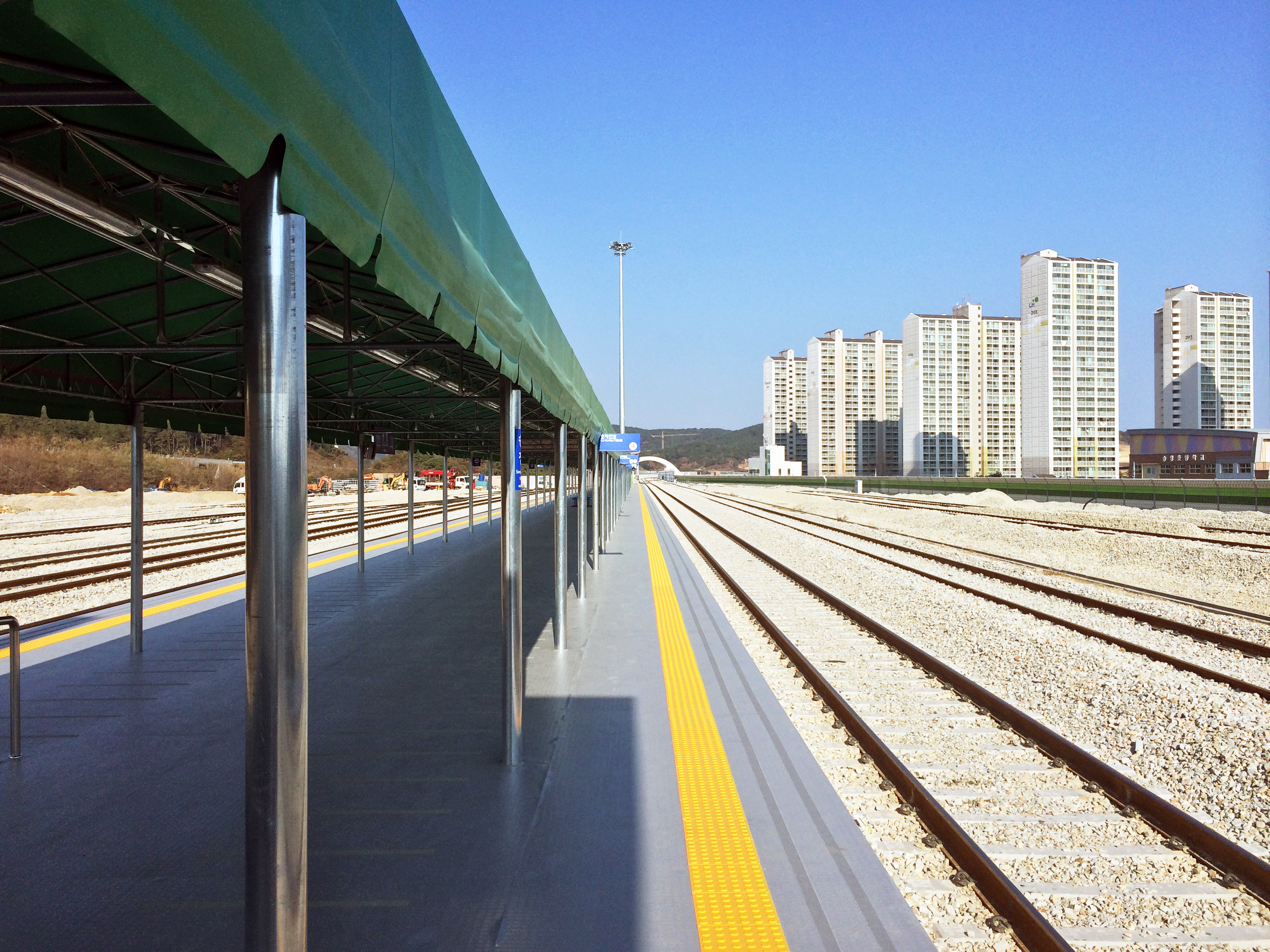
Old platform of Songjeong station

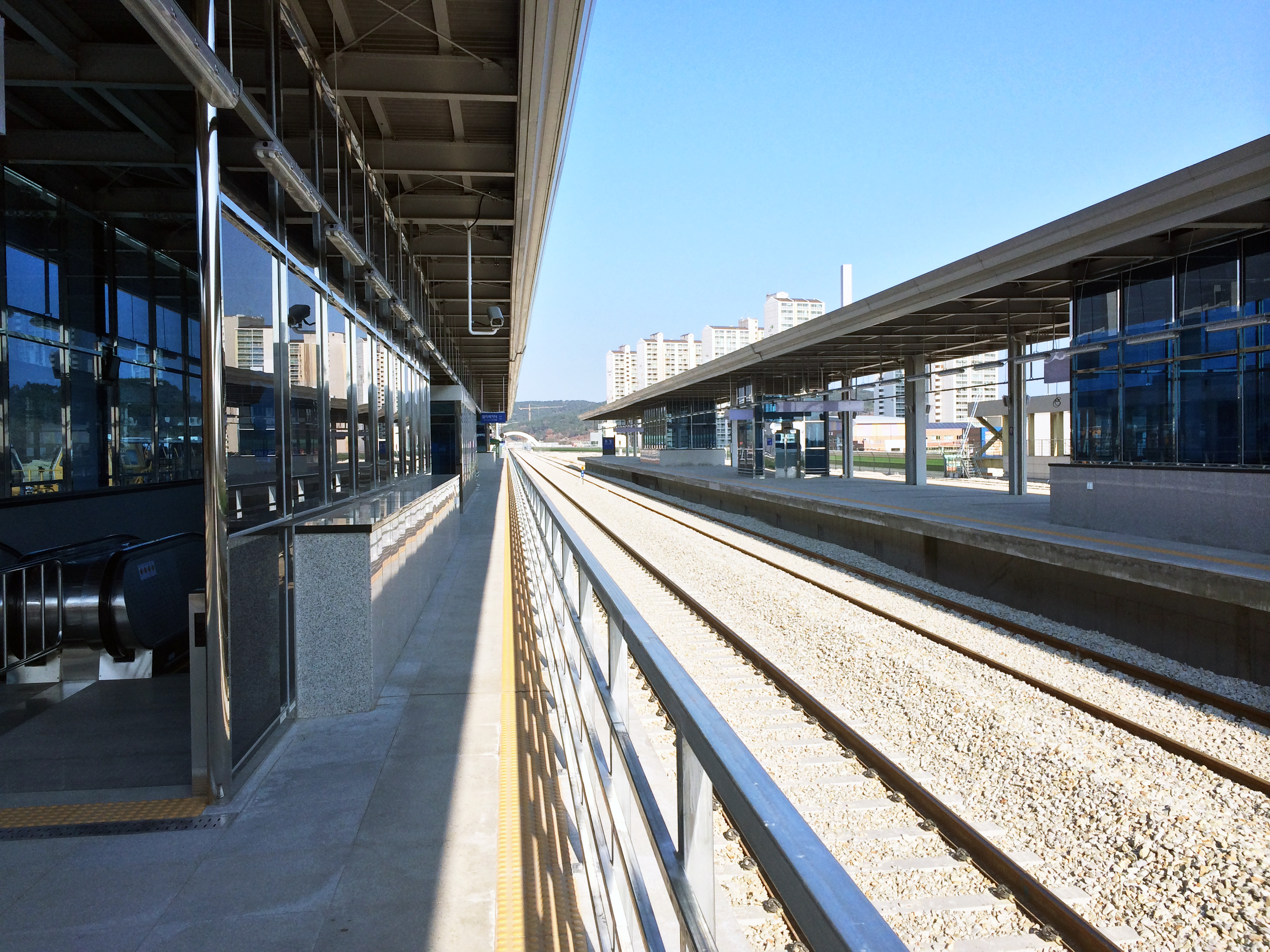
New platform before electrification

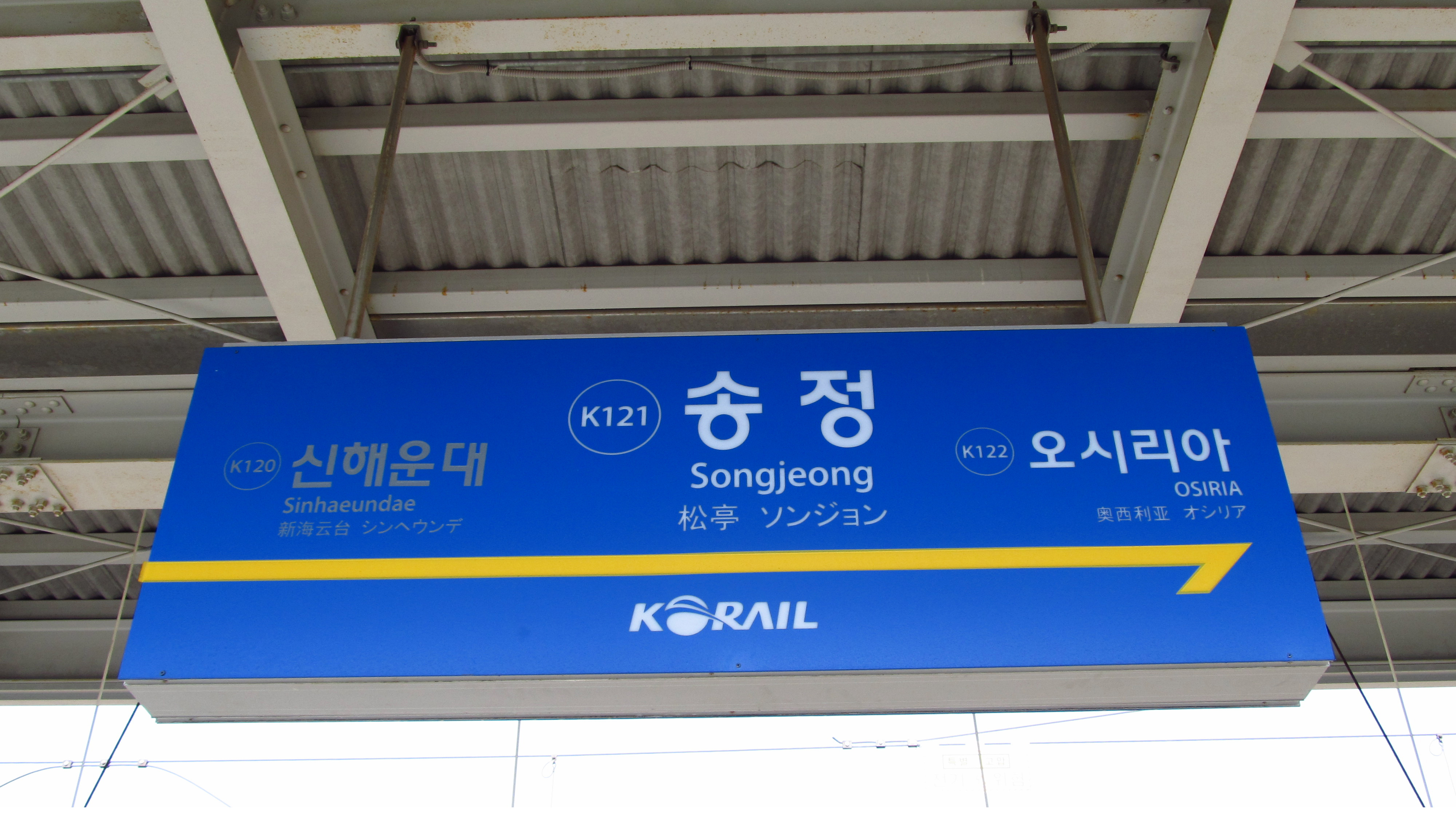
Station sign (Donghae Line)

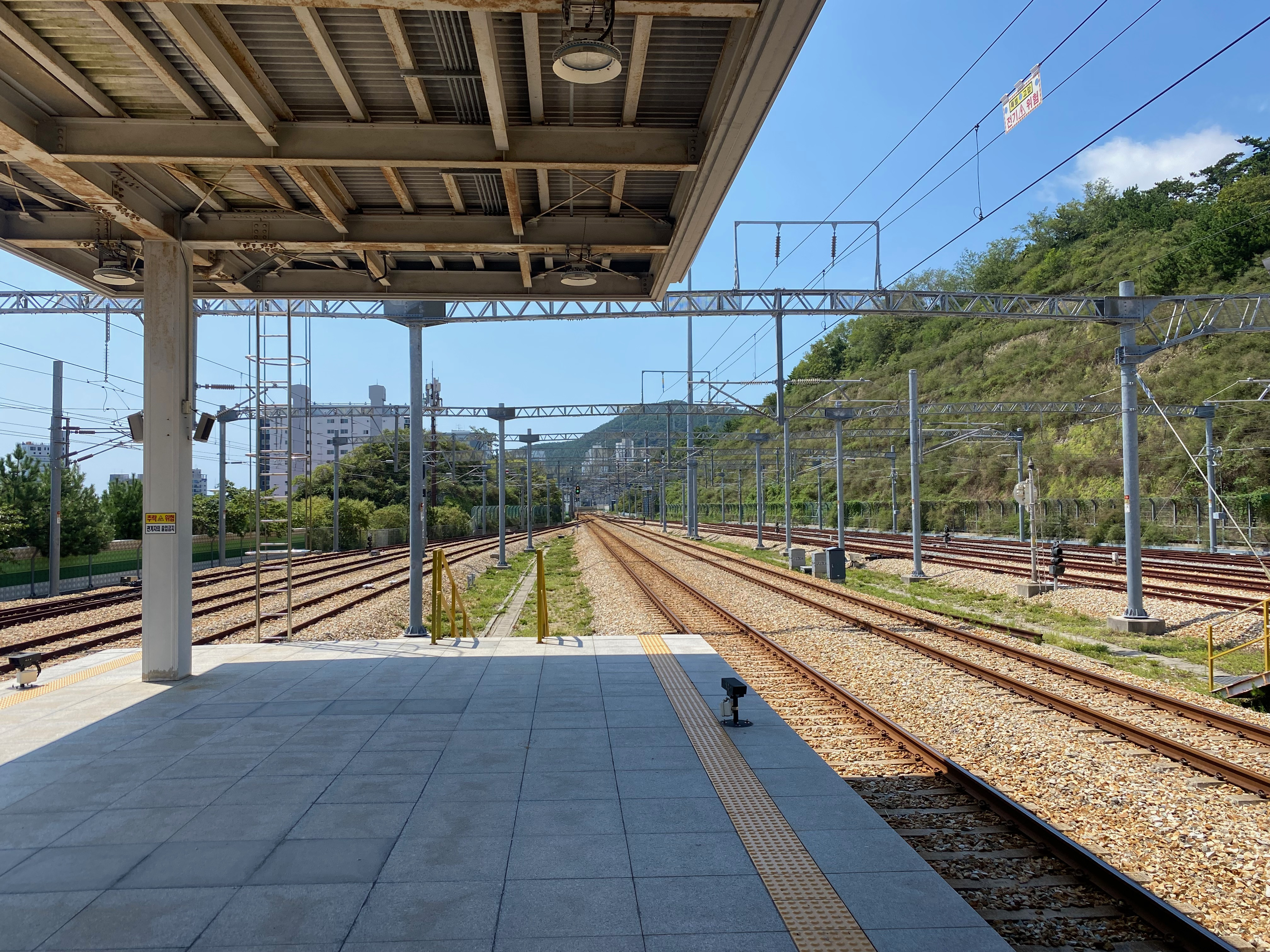
The new platform of Songjeong station
