= National Route 43 (South Korea) =

Road in South Korea

National Route 43
- Sejong-Kosong Line 국도 제43호선

Route information
- Length: 277.2 km (172.2 mi)
- Existed: 31 August 1971–present

Major junctions
- South end: Areum-dong, Sejong City
- North end: North Korean border in Cheorwon County, Gangwon Province (unofficial); Kosong County, North Korea (official)

Location
- Country: South Korea

Highway system
- Highway systems of South Korea; Expressways; National; Local
← National Route 42	→ National Route 44

National Route 43 is a national highway in South Korea connecting Sejong City to Kosong County (North Korea). It was established on 31 August 1971.

== History ==
- August 31, 1971: National Route 43, the Seoul–Goseong Line, was established under the General National Highway Route Designation Decree.
- March 14, 1981: The starting point was extended from Sejongno, Jongno District, Seoul, to Hyangnam-myeon, Hwaseong County (present-day Hyangnam-eup, Hwaseong City), while the terminus was changed from Goseong-myeon, Goseong County, Gangwon Province, to Goseong-eup. Accordingly, the route was changed from the Seoul–Goseong Line to the Balan–Goseong Line.
- April 6, 1981: The 96.2 km section between Balan-ri, Hyangnam-myeon, Hwaseong County (Balan Five-way Intersection), and Uijeongbu-dong, Uijeongbu City (in front of Uijeongbu Station), which had been elevated to national highway status, was opened.
- May 30, 1981: The road district was changed to the extended 105 km section following the amendment of the General National Highway Route Designation Decree by Presidential Decree No. 10247.
- February 22, 1988: Existing designated sections in Geumo-dong and Jail-dong, Uijeongbu City; Songu-ri, Soheul-myeon, Pocheon County; and between Sin-eup-ri, Pocheon-eup, and Giji-ri, Sinbuk-myeon, Pocheon County, were abolished.
- February 23, 1988: The existing designated section in Gyomun-dong, Guri City, was abolished.
- March 31, 1990: The existing designated 551 m section in Sincheorwon-ri, Galmal-eup, Cheorwon County, Gangwon Province, and the existing designated 108 m section in Giji-ri, Sinbuk-myeon, Pocheon County, Gyeonggi Province, were abolished.
- January 12, 1996: The 120 m Hakpo Bridge section in Haksa-ri, Gimhwa-eup, Cheorwon County, was reconstructed and opened.
- July 1, 1996: The starting point was extended from Hyangnam-myeon, Hwaseong County, Gyeonggi Province, to Jeonui-myeon, Yeongi County, South Chungcheong Province. Accordingly, the route became the Yeongi–Goseong Line.
- October 21, 1996: The 6.8 km section between Gangpo-ri and Munhye-ri, Galmal-eup, Cheorwon County, was opened.
- June 30, 1997: The 4.19 km Pocheon Bypass between Sin-eup-ri, Pocheon-eup, and Gacha-ri, Sinbuk-myeon, Pocheon County, was opened and the existing 4.6 km section was abolished. The 1.8 km Yangmun Bypass section in Yangmun-ri, Yeongjung-myeon, was also opened and the existing section was abolished.
- December 14, 1997: The 4.63 km Suwon–Suji road between Iui-dong, Paldal District, Suwon City, and Jukjeon-ri, Suji-eup, Yongin City, was widened and opened, while the existing 3.04 km section was abolished.
- December 26, 1997: The 12.26 km Gwangju–Hanam City Boundary road between Taejeon-ri, Gwangju-eup, and Eommi-ri, Jungbu-myeon, Gwangju County, was widened and opened, while the existing 3.87 km section was abolished.
- November 30, 1999: The 3.81 km Pocheon–Sincheorwon road between Munan-ri and Uncheon-ri, Yeongbuk-myeon, Pocheon County, was widened and opened, while the existing section was abolished.
- March 13, 2001: The 2.7 km Suji–Gwangju road section in Jukjeon-ri, Suji-eup, Yongin City, was widened and opened, while the existing 1.95 km section was abolished.
- January 7, 2002: The 11.7 km Suji–Gwangju road between Jukjeon-dong, Yongin City, and Gosan-ri, Opo-eup, Gwangju City, was widened and opened, while the existing section between Jukjeon-dong, Yongin City, and Yeok-dong, Gwangju City, was abolished.
- July 31, 2003: The 8.9 km section between Undang-ri, Sojeong-myeon, Yeongi County, and Galmae-ri, Baebang-myeon, Asan City, was designated as an automobile-only road.
- August 12, 2005: A 90 m section of the Munhye–Jigyeong road in Munhye-ri, Galmal-eup, Cheorwon County, was abolished.
- December 19, 2005: The 11.89 km Cheonan National Highway Bypass section between Galmae-ri, Baebang-myeon, Asan City, and Songchon-ri, Eumbong-myeon, was designated as an automobile-only road.
- December 13, 2006: The 14.3 km section between Wangnim-ri, Bongdam-eup, Hwaseong City, and Mangpo-dong, Yeongtong District, Suwon City, was designated as an automobile-only road.
- January 19, 2007: The 12.52 km Munhye–Gimhwa road between Munhye-ri, Galmal-eup, and Haksa-ri, Gimhwa-eup, Cheorwon County, was newly constructed and opened.
- January 11, 2008: The 5.96 km section between Songchon-ri, Eumbong-myeon, Asan City, and Bongjae-ri, Dunpo-myeon, was designated as an automobile-only road.
- October 29, 2009: A 1.0 km, two-lane section of the Suwon National Highway Bypass, specifically the Buncheon–Songsan road in Annyang-dong, Hwaseong City, was temporarily opened.
- April 5, 2010: The 5.97 km section between Bongjae-ri, Dunpo-myeon, Asan City, South Chungcheong Province, and Noryang-ri, Paengseong-eup, Pyeongtaek City, Gyeonggi Province, was designated as an automobile-only road.
- April 4, 2012: The 11.27 km section between Noryang-ri, Paengseong-eup, Pyeongtaek City, and Yanggyo-ri, Osan-myeon, was designated as an automobile-only road.
- June 29, 2012: The 5.4 km road connecting Toegyewon Interchange between Sano-dong, Guri City, and Hwachon-ri, Byeollae-myeon, Namyangju City, was opened.
- September 28, 2012: A 2.16 km section of the Suwon National Highway Bypass between Banwol-dong, Hwaseong City, and Yeongtong-dong, Yeongtong District, Suwon City, was temporarily opened. The road above Mangpo Underpass and its connecting road were not yet open.
- November 26, 2012: The 5.22 km section between Taesan-ri, Janggun-myeon, and Susan-ri, Yeongi-myeon, Sejong Special Self-Governing City, was opened.
- December 28, 2012: The 8.9 km Sojeong–Baebang road between Sojeong-ri, Sojeong-myeon, Sejong Special Self-Governing City, and Galmae-ri, Baebang-eup, Asan City, was newly constructed and opened.
- December 31, 2012: The 2.7 km section of the Suwon National Highway Bypass between Annyang-dong and Jinan-dong, Hwaseong City, was newly constructed and opened. The connecting road to Jinan Intersection was not yet open.
- June 20, 2013: The 1.24 km section between Sanul-ri, Yeongi-myeon, and Goun-dong, Sejong Special Self-Governing City, was opened.
- December 24, 2013: The starting point was extended from Sojeong-myeon, Yeongi County, South Chungcheong Province, to Areum-dong, Sejong Special Self-Governing City. Accordingly, the route became the Sejong–Goseong Line.
- March 28, 2015: The 11.9 km Baebang–Eumbong road between Galmae-ri, Baebang-eup, Asan City, and Songchon Intersection, Songchon-ri, Eumbong-myeon, was newly constructed and opened.
- June 30, 2015: The 2.8 km Buncheon–Songsan road between Wangnim-ri, Bongdam-eup, Hwaseong City, and Botong-ri, Jeongnam-myeon, was newly constructed and opened.
- August 5, 2015: A 240 m section of an interchange access road on the Buncheon–Songsan road in Annyang-dong, Hwaseong City, was opened.
- October 30, 2015: The 4.5 km Buncheon–Songsan road between Botong-ri, Jeongnam-myeon, and Annyang-dong, Hwaseong City, was newly constructed and opened.
- February 5, 2016: The 2.16 km Mangpo Intersection connecting road between Banwol-dong, Hwaseong City, and Yeongtong-dong, Yeongtong District, Suwon City, was newly constructed and opened.
- May 30, 2016: The 3.74 km Gwangjeon IC–Uijeongbu road between Gwangjeon-ri and Cheonghak-ri, Byeollae-myeon, Namyangju City, was widened and opened.
- November 19, 2016: The 11.93 km Eumbong–Paengseong road between Songchon-ri, Eumbong-myeon, Asan City, and Noryang-ri, Paengseong-eup, Pyeongtaek City, was newly constructed and opened. The 11.27 km Paengseong–Oseong road between Noryang-ri, Paengseong-eup, and Sukseong-ri, Oseong-myeon, Pyeongtaek City, was also newly constructed and opened.
- July 11, 2017: Following the opening of the Suwon National Highway Bypass, the route through the Hwaseong City–Suwon City section was changed.
- January 28, 2020: Due to the Hwaseong Hyangnam 2 District housing development project, the 2.4 km route between Bangchuk-ri and Hagil-ri, Hyangnam-eup, Hwaseong City, was changed, while the existing 2.0 km section in Hagil-ri was abolished.
- December 31, 2020: The 7.49 km Uijeongbu–Soheul road between Idonggyo-ri and Songu-ri, Soheul-eup, Pocheon City, was widened and opened.

== Main stopovers ==
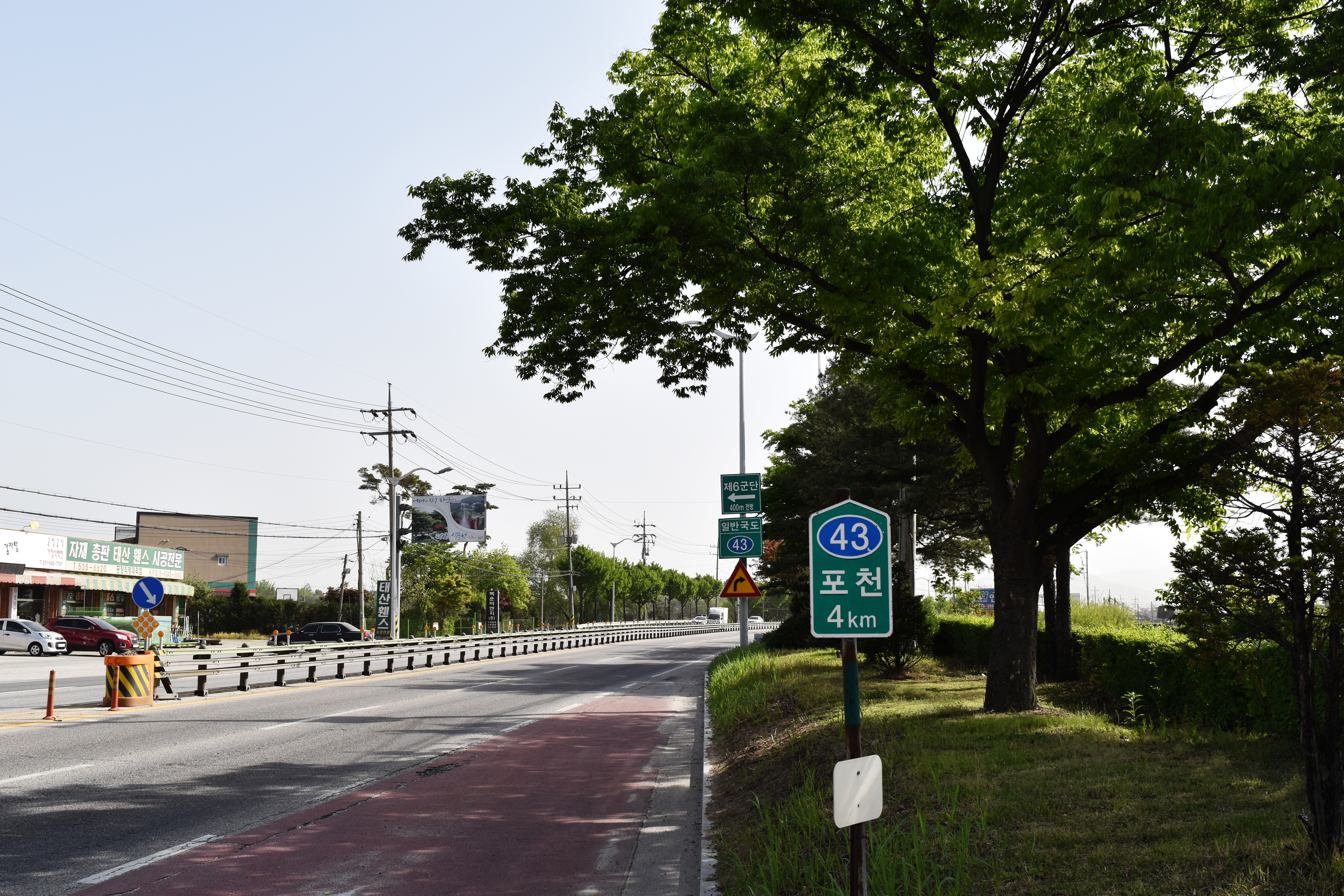
National Route 43 nearby Pocheon

=== South Korea section ===
Sejong City

- Areum-dong - Goun-dong - Yeongi-myeon - Janggun-myeon

South Chungcheong Province

- Gongju - Cheonan

Sejong City

- Jeonui-myeon

South Chungcheong Province

- Cheonan

Sejong City

- Sojeong-myeon

South Chungcheong Province

- Cheonan - Asan

Gyeonggi Province

- Pyeongtaek - Hwaseong - Suwon - Yongin - Suwon - Yongin - Gwangju - Hanam

Seoul

- Gangdong District

Gyeonggi Province

- Hanam

Seoul

- Gangdong District - Songpa District - Gangdong District - Cheonho Bridge - Gwangjin District

Gyeonggi Province

- Guri - Namyangju - Uijeongbu - Pocheon

Gangwon Province

- Cheorwon County

=== North Korea section ===
Kangwon Province

- Kumsong County - Hoeyang County - Kosong County

== Major intersections ==
- (■): Motorway

IS: Intersection, IC: Interchange

=== Sejong City·South Chungcheong Province ===
Name	Hangul name	Connection	Location		Note
Mogae Overpass	모개고가차도	National Route 1 National Route 36 (Sejong-ro); Mirinae-ro	Sejong City	Yeongi-myeon	Terminus
Sejong Field Golf Club	세종필드골프클럽		Sejong City	Yeongi-myeon	
Susan IS	수산 교차로	Jobaengi-gil	Sejong City	Yeongi-myeon	
Susan Tunnel	수산터널		Sejong City	Yeongi-myeon	Approximately 774m
Susan Tunnel			Sejong City	Janggun-myeon	Approximately 774m
Yongam IS	용암 교차로	Yongyeon-ro	Sejong City	Janggun-myeon	Old Prefectural Route 627
Jungheung IS	중흥 교차로	Gunggol-gil	Gongju City	Uidang-myeon	
Wolgye Bridge Sinchoncheon Bridge	월계교 신촌천교		Gongju City	Uidang-myeon	
Deokhak IS	덕학 교차로	Prefectural Route 691 (Uidangjeonui-ro)	Gongju City	Uidang-myeon	
Eomul 3 Tunnel	어물3터널		Gongju City	Uidang-myeon	Approximately 1300m
Eomul 3 Tunnel			Gongju City	Jeongan-myeon	Approximately 1300m
Eomul 2 Tunnel	어물2터널		Gongju City	Jeongan-myeon	Approximately 270m
Eomul 1 Tunnel	어물1터널		Gongju City	Jeongan-myeon	Approximately 940m
Gwangjeong-ri Connecting Road	광정리연결로	Changmal 3-gil	Gongju City	Jeongan-myeon	
Gwangjeong Bridge	광정교		Gongju City	Jeongan-myeon	
Changmal IS (Jeongan IC)	창말 교차로 (정안 나들목)	Nonsan-Cheonan Expressway	Gongju City	Jeongan-myeon	
Jeongan IC IS	정안IC 교차로	National Route 23 (Charyeong-ro)	Gongju City	Jeongan-myeon	National Route 23 overlap
Charyeong Tunnel	차령터널		Gongju City	Jeongan-myeon	National Route 23 overlap Right tunnel: Approximately 490m Left tunnel: Approximately 445m
Charyeong Tunnel			Cheonan City	Dongnam District Gwangdeok-myeon	National Route 23 overlap Right tunnel: Approximately 490m Left tunnel: Approximately 445m
Wondeok Bridge	원덕교	Charyeonggogae-ro	Cheonan City	Dongnam District Gwangdeok-myeon	National Route 23 overlap
Yucheon IS	유천 교차로	National Route 1 (Sejong-ro)	Sejong City	Jeonui-myeon	National Route 1, National Route 23 overlap
Gujeong IS	구정사거리	Unjusan-ro; Haengjeong-gil	Cheonan City	Dongnam District Gwangdeok-myeon	National Route 1, National Route 23 overlap
Haengjeong IS	행정삼거리	Prefectural Route 623 (Charyeonggogae-ro)	Sejong City	Sojeong-myeon	National Route 1, National Route 23 overlap
Undang-ri IS	운당리삼거리	Sojeonggu-gil	Sejong City	Sojeong-myeon	National Route 1, National Route 23 overlap
Undang IS	운당 교차로	National Route 1 National Route 23 (Sejong-ro)	Sejong City	Sojeong-myeon	National Route 1, National Route 23 overlap
South Pungse IC (South Pungse IC IS)	남풍세 나들목 (남풍세IC 교차로)	Nonsan-Cheonan Expressway	Cheonan City	Dongnam District Pungse-myeon	
Pungse IS	풍세 교차로	Songjeong 2-gil	Cheonan City	Dongnam District Pungse-myeon	
Pungsecheon Bridge	풍서천교		Cheonan City	Dongnam District Pungse-myeon	
Yongjeong IS	용정 교차로	Taehaksan-ro	Cheonan City	Dongnam District Pungse-myeon	
Samtae IS	삼태 교차로	Bonggangcheon-ro; Geumho 1-gil	Cheonan City	Dongnam District Pungse-myeon	
Hoseo Bridge	호서교		Asan City	Baebang-eup	
Jangyeong Bridge	장영교		Asan City	Baebang-eup	
Jangyeong Bridge			Asan City	Tangjeong-myeon	
Buksu IS	북수 교차로	National Route 21 (Oncheon-daero); Buksudong-ro	Asan City	Tangjeong-myeon	Connected with Eunsu IS
Samseong Bridge	삼성교		Asan City	Tangjeong-myeon	
Hyeonchung IS	현충 교차로	Prefectural Route 624 (Isunsin-daero)	Asan City	Yeomchi-eup	
Yongdu IS	용두 교차로	National Route 39 (Baebang-Tangjeong Motorway)	Asan City	Yeomchi-eup	
Yongdugani IS	용두간이 교차로	Kkoekkolseong-gil	Asan City	Tangjeong-myeon	
Yongdusaengtae Tunnel	용두생태터널		Asan City	Tangjeong-myeon	Approximately 120m
Yongdu Tunnel	용두터널		Asan City	Tangjeong-myeon	Approximately 985m
Yongdu Tunnel			Asan City	Eumbong-myeon	Approximately 985m
Songchon IS	송촌 교차로	Prefectural Route 628 (Eumbong-ro)	Asan City	Eumbong-myeon	
Songchonsaengtaetongro	송촌생태통로		Asan City	Eumbong-myeon	Approximately 20m
Eumbongsandan IS	음봉산단 교차로	Prefectural Route 70 (Yeonamyulgeum-ro)	Asan City	Eumbong-myeon	
Bongjae IS	봉재 교차로	Bongsin-ro	Asan City	Dunpo-myeon	
Sinhang IS	신항 교차로	National Route 45 (Chungmu-ro); Haewian-gil	Asan City	Dunpo-myeon	
Songyong Underpass	송용지하차도		Asan City	Dunpo-myeon	
Sinnam IS	신남 교차로	National Route 34 (Jangyeongsil-ro)	Asan City	Dunpo-myeon	
Sinbeop IS	신법 교차로	Asanho-ro	Asan City	Dunpo-myeon	
Sindunpocheon Bridge	신둔포천교		Asan City	Dunpo-myeon	Continuation into Gyeonggi Province

=== Gyeonggi Province (South Seoul) ===
Name	Hangul name	Connection	Location		Note
Sindunpocheon Bridge	신둔포천교		Pyeongtaek City	Paengseong-eup	South Chungcheong Province - Gyeonggi Province border line
Sindae IS	신대 교차로	Gyeyang-ro	Pyeongtaek City	Paengseong-eup	
Paengseong IS	팽성 교차로	Paengseongnam-ro	Pyeongtaek City	Paengseong-eup	
Pyeongtaek Bridge	평택대교		Pyeongtaek City	Paengseong-eup	
Pyeongtaek Bridge			Pyeongtaek City	Anjung-eup	
Gileum IS	길음 교차로	Gangbyeon-ro	Pyeongtaek City	Oseong-myeon	
Oseong IC	오성 나들목	Pyeongtaek-Paju Expressway; National Route 38 (Seodong-daero)	Pyeongtaek City	Oseong-myeon	
Yanggyo-ri	양교리		Pyeongtaek City	Oseong-myeon	Proposal
Tojin-ri	토진리	Prefectural Route 302	Pyeongtaek City	Cheongbuk-eup	Proposal
Eoso-ri	어소리		Pyeongtaek City	Cheongbuk-eup	Proposal
Sinwang-ri	신왕리		Hwaseong City	Yanggam-myeon	Proposal
Sinwang IS	신왕삼거리	Prefectural Route 306 (Eunhaengnamu-ro); Chorok-ro	Hwaseong City	Yanggam-myeon	
Sangsan-ri Entrance IS	상산리입구삼거리	Jeyakdanji-ro	Hwaseong City	Yanggam-myeon	
Sangdu-ri Entrance IS	상두리입구삼거리	Soltaesangdu-gil	Hwaseong City	Hyangnam-eup	
(Yangseokgol)	(양석골)	Prefectural Route 309 (Seobong-ro)	Hwaseong City	Hyangnam-eup	
Hyangnam IS	향남 교차로	National Route 82 (Poseunghyangnam-ro)	Hwaseong City	Hyangnam-eup	
Hyangnam Buyeong 9 Complex	향남부영9단지	Baranyanggam-ro; Hyangnam-ro	Hwaseong City	Hyangnam-eup	
Bangchuk-ri	방축리	Hyangnam-ro	Hwaseong City	Hyangnam-eup	
West of Hyangnam 2 Bridge	향남2교 서단	Haengjeongnam-ro	Hwaseong City	Hyangnam-eup	
Yanggam Entrance IS	양감입구삼거리	Samcheonbyeongma-ro	Hwaseong City	Hyangnam-eup	
Balan IS	발안사거리	Prefectural Route 82 (Baran-ro) (Pyeong 3-gil)	Hwaseong City	Hyangnam-eup	
Jangjim IS	장짐 교차로	Pureundeulpan-ro	Hwaseong City	Hyangnam-eup	
Jeomchon IS	점촌 교차로	Hyangnamro	Hwaseong City	Paltan-myeon	
Gajae IS	가재 교차로	National Route 82; Prefectural Route 82 (Poseunghyangnam-ro)	Hwaseong City	Paltan-myeon	
Paltan Entrance IS	팔탄입구삼거리	Prefectural Route 310; Prefectural Route 318 (Madangbawi-ro)	Hwaseong City	Bongdam-eup	
Deokri IS	덕리사거리	Sicheong-ro	Hwaseong City	Bongdam-eup	
Wangrim IS	왕림 교차로	Samcheonbyeongma-ro	Hwaseong City	Bongdam-eup	
Wangrim Bridge	왕림교		Hwaseong City	Bongdam-eup	
(Saengtaetongro)	(생태통로)		Hwaseong City	Bongdam-eup	60m long
Botong 1 Bridge	보통1교		Hwaseong City	Bongdam-eup	
Botong 1 Bridge			Hwaseong City	Jeongnam-myeon	
Botong IS (Botong 2 Bridge)	보통 교차로 (보통2교)	Choerubaek-ro; Botongnae-gil; Botongnae-gil 253beon-gil	Hwaseong City	Jeongnam-myeon	
Botong 3 Bridge	보통3교		Hwaseong City	Jeongnam-myeon	
Botong 3 Bridge			Hwaseong City	Bongdam-eup	
Sugi IS (Sugi Underpass)	수기 교차로 (수기지하차도)	Seja-ro; Choerubaek-ro	Hwaseong City	Bongdam-eup	
Sugi IS (Sugi Underpass)		Seja-ro; Choerubaek-ro	Hwaseong City	Hwasan-dong	
Sugi 2 Bridge	수기2교		Hwaseong City	Hwasan-dong	
Mannyeonje IS (Hwasan 1 Bridge)	만년제 교차로 (화산1교)	Annyeongnam-ro	Hwaseong City	Hwasan-dong	
Hwasan 2 Bridge Hwasan 3 Bridge Mannyeon Bridge	화산2교 화산3교 만년교		Hwaseong City	Hwasan-dong	
Annyeong IC	안녕 나들목	Osan-Hwaseong Expressway	Hwaseong City	Hwasan-dong	
Hwanggujicheon Bridge	황구지천교		Hwaseong City	Hwasan-dong	
Hwanggujicheon Bridge			Hwaseong City	Byeongjeom-dong	
Jinan 1 Overpass Jinan 1 Underpass Jinan 2 Underpass	진안1육교 진안1지하차도 진안2지하차도		Hwaseong City	Jinan-dong	
Jinan IS (Jinan 3 Underpass)	진안 교차로 (진안3지하차도)	National Route 1 (Gyeonggi-daero)	Hwaseong City	Jinan-dong	
Taean IS (Taean Underpass)	태안 교차로 (태안지하차도)	Byeongjeom 1-ro Byeongjeomjungang-ro	Hwaseong City	Jinan-dong	
Gisan 1 Bridge	기산1교		Hwaseong City	Jinan-dong	
Gisan IS (Gisan Overpass)	기산 교차로 (기산육교)	Dongtanjiseong-ro	Hwaseong City	Jinan-dong	
Gisan IS (Gisan Overpass)		Dongtanjiseong-ro	Hwaseong City	Banwol-dong	
Hanban Bridge	한반교		Hwaseong City	Banwol-dong	
(E-mart Everyday Sinyeongtong Store)	(이마트에브리데이 신영통점)	Prefectural Route 315 (Yeongtong-ro)	Suwon City	Yeongtong District	Mangpo Underpass section
Daeseon Elementary School	대선초등학교	Yeongtong-ro 154beon-gil	Suwon City	Yeongtong District	Mangpo Underpass section
(Mangpo Overpass)	(망포육교)	Yeongtong-ro 200beon-gil	Suwon City	Yeongtong District	Only for Hwaseong
No name	(이름 없음)	Prefectural Route 315 (Deokyeong-daero)	Suwon City	Yeongtong District	
Salgugol IS	살구골삼거리	Bongyeong-ro 1517beon-gil	Suwon City	Yeongtong District	
Yeongtong station IS	영통역사거리	Maeyeong-ro	Suwon City	Yeongtong District	
Homeplus Yeongtong Store Lotte Mart Yeongtong Store	홈플러스 영통점 롯데마트 영통점		Suwon City	Yeongtong District	
Salgugol IS	살구골삼거리	Bongyeong-ro 1517beon-gil	Suwon City	Yeongtong District	
Yeongtong station IS	영통역사거리	Maeyeong-ro	Suwon City	Yeongtong District	
Keyaki tree IS	느티나무사거리	Cheongmyeong-ro	Suwon City	Yeongtong District	
Cheongmyeong station IS	청명역사거리	Cheongmyeongbuk-ro	Suwon City	Yeongtong District	
Hwanggol IS	황골사거리	Bongyeong-ro 1744beon-gil Yeongtong-ro 514beon-gil	Suwon City	Yeongtong District	
Yeongtong Overpass IS	영통고가사거리	National Route 42; Prefectural Route 98 (Jungbu-daero); Heungdeok 3-ro	Suwon City	Yeongtong District	National Route 42 overlap Prefectural Route 98 overlap
Yeongtong Overpass IS		National Route 42; Prefectural Route 98 (Jungbu-daero); Heungdeok 3-ro	Yongin City	Giheung District	National Route 42 overlap Prefectural Route 98 overlap
Premium Outlets IS	프리미엄아울렛사거리	Jungbudae-ro 56beon-gil	Yongin City	Giheung District	National Route 42 overlap Prefectural Route 98 overlap
Samsung IS	삼성삼거리	Samsung-ro	Yongin City	Giheung District	National Route 42 overlap Prefectural Route 98 overlap
Samsung IS		Samsung-ro	Suwon City	Yeongtong District	National Route 42 overlap Prefectural Route 98 overlap
Samsung Electronics IS	삼성전자삼거리	Heungdeok 1-ro	Suwon City	Yeongtong District	National Route 42 overlap Prefectural Route 98 overlap
Nachonmal IS	나촌말삼거리	Jungbu-daero 448beon-gil	Suwon City	Yeongtong District	National Route 42 overlap Prefectural Route 98 overlap
Woncheon Bridge	원천교		Suwon City	Yeongtong District	National Route 42 overlap Prefectural Route 98 overlap
Woncheon Bridge IS	원천교삼거리	Gwanggyohosu-ro; Dongtanwoncheon-ro	Suwon City	Yeongtong District	National Route 42 overlap Prefectural Route 98 overlap
Yuwonji IS	유원지삼거리	Gwanggyohosugongwon-ro; Jungbu-daero 392beon-gil	Suwon City	Yeongtong District	National Route 42 overlap Prefectural Route 98 overlap
Gwanteo IS	관터사거리	Maebong-ro; Jungbu-daero 345beon-gil	Suwon City	Yeongtong District	National Route 42 overlap Prefectural Route 98 overlap
Beopwon IS	법원사거리	Dongsuwon-ro	Suwon City	Yeongtong District	National Route 42 overlap Prefectural Route 98 overlap
Jumakgeori IS	주막거리사거리	Maeyeoul-ro; Jungbu-daero 271beon-gil	Suwon City	Yeongtong District	National Route 42 overlap Prefectural Route 98 overlap
Ajou University IS (Ajudae Intercity Bus Terminal)	아주대삼거리 (아주대시외버스정류장)	Aju-ro	Suwon City	Yeongtong District	National Route 42 overlap Prefectural Route 98 overlap
Bangadari IS	방아다리삼거리	Jungbu-daero 246beon-gil	Suwon City	Paldal District	National Route 42 overlap Prefectural Route 98 overlap
Gasangol IS	가산골삼거리	Jungbu-daero 223beon-gil	Suwon City	Paldal District	National Route 42 overlap Prefectural Route 98 overlap
Uman IS	우만사거리	Gwongwang-ro	Suwon City	Paldal District	National Route 42 overlap Prefectural Route 98 overlap
Ingyeangol IS	인계안골사거리	Jungbu-daero 170beon-gil	Suwon City	Paldal District	National Route 42 overlap Prefectural Route 98 overlap
Dongsuwon IS	동수원사거리	National Route 1 (Gyeongsu-daero); National Route 42; Prefectural Route 98 (Jungbu-daero)	Suwon City	Paldal District	National Route 42 overlap Prefectural Route 98 overlap National Route 1 overlap
Motgol IS	못골사거리	Seji-ro	Suwon City	Paldal District	National Route 1 overlap
Changnyongmun	창룡문		Suwon City	Paldal District	National Route 1 overlap
Changnyongmun IS	창룡문사거리	National Route 1 (Gyeongsu-daero); Changnyong-daero	Suwon City	Paldal District	National Route 1 overlap
Changnyongmun IS		National Route 1 (Gyeongsu-daero); Changnyong-daero	Suwon City	North: Jangan District; South: Paldal District	National Route 1 overlap
Tungsubawi IS	퉁소바위사거리	Woldeukeom-ro	Suwon City	North: Jangan District; South: Paldal District	
Uman-dong Intercity Bus Stop	우만동시외버스정류장		Suwon City	North: Jangan District; South: Paldal District	
Uman Elementary School IS	우만초교사거리	Changnyong-daero 210beon-gil	Suwon City	North: Jangan District; South: Paldal District	
Gyeonggi Provincial Police Agency IS	경기지방경찰청사거리		Suwon City	North: Jangan District; South: Paldal District	
Suwon Welfare Center for the Disabled Suwon Academy of Foreign Languages Suwon Museum	수원시장애인종합복지관 수원외국어고등학교 수원박물관		Suwon City	Yeongtong District	
Kyonggi University Suwon Campus IS	경기대후문사거리	Daehak-ro	Suwon City	Yeongtong District	
East Suwon IC	동수원 나들목	Yeongdong Expressway	Suwon City	Yeongtong District	
Gwanggyo IS	광교사거리	Gwanggyo-ro	Suwon City	Yeongtong District	
No name	(이름 없음)	Senteureolpakeu-ro	Suwon City	Yeongtong District	
Gwanggyo-Sanghyeon IC	광교상현 나들목	Yongin-Seoul Expressway	Suwon City	Yeongtong District	
Gwanggyo-Sanghyeon IC		Yongin-Seoul Expressway	Yongin City	Suji District	
Gwanggyojungang-ro IS	광교중앙로삼거리	Gwanggyojungang-ro	Yongin City	Suji District	
Sanghyeon IS	상현 교차로	Sanghyeon-ro; Suji-ro	Yongin City	Suji District	
Seowonma-eul IS	서원마을삼거리		Yongin City	Suji District	
Sanghyeondong Overpass IS (Manghyekn 1 Overpass)	상현동육교 교차로 (망현1육교)	Sanghyeon-ro; Seongbok 2-ro	Yongin City	Suji District	
Jeongpyeong IS	정평사거리	Manhyeon-ro; Suji-ro 112beon-gil	Yongin City	Suji District	
Pungduck High School IS	풍덕고교사거리	Jeongpyeong-ro; Jinsan-ro	Yongin City	Suji District	
Korea Energy Agency IS	에너지관리공단삼거리		Yongin City	Suji District	
Suji District Office IS	수지구청사거리	Munjeong-ro	Yongin City	Suji District	
Suji District Office Munjeong Middle School	수지구청 문정중학교		Yongin City	Suji District	
Munjeong Middle School IS	문정중학교삼거리	Pungdeokcheon-ro 160beon-gil	Yongin City	Suji District	
Pungdeokcheon IS	풍덕천사거리	Prefectural Route 23 (Sinsu-ro)	Yongin City	Suji District	Prefectural Route 23 overlap
Pungdeokcheon IS	풍덕천삼거리	Bundang-Seosu Urban Expressway; Yonggu-daero 2469beon-gil	Yongin City	Suji District	Prefectural Route 23 overlap
Yongin Arpia Athletic Park Jukjeon 2-dong Community Center Jukjeon station (Shinsegae Gyeonggi Store)	용인아르피아체육공원 죽전2동주민센터 죽전역 (신세계백화점 경기점)		Yongin City	Suji District	Prefectural Route 23 overlap
Jukjeon IS	죽전사거리	Prefectural Route 23 (Yonggu-daero)	Yongin City	Suji District	Prefectural Route 23 overlap
Jukjeon IS	죽전삼거리	Daeji-ro	Yongin City	Suji District	
Tteurieche Apartment IS	뜨리에체아파트삼거리		Yongin City	Suji District	
Kkochme IS	꽃메 교차로	Dongbaekjukjeon-daero	Yongin City	Suji District	
Jukjeon IS	죽전 교차로	Daeji-ro	Yongin City	Suji District	
Osan Overpass	오산육교	Daeji-ro; Poeun-daero 896beon-gil	Yongin City	Cheoin District Mohyeon-eup	
Yangchon Bridge	양촌교	Daeji-ro; Osan-ro	Yongin City	Cheoin District Mohyeon-eup	
Neungwon Bridge	능원교	Neungwon-ro; Opo-ro	Yongin City	Cheoin District Mohyeon-eup	
Neungwon IS	능원 교차로	Prefectural Route 57 (Taejae-ro)	Yongin City	Cheoin District Mohyeon-eup	
Munhyeong Bridge	문형교		Yongin City	Cheoin District Mohyeon-eup	
Munhyeong Bridge			Gwangju City	Opo-eup	
Munhyeong IS	문형 교차로	Munhyeon-ro; Opo-ro	Gwangju City	Opo-eup	
Chuja IS	추자 교차로	Opo-ro; Hyeongok-gil	Gwangju City	Opo-eup	
Opo IS	오포 교차로	Opo-ro 909beon-gil Yangchon-gil	Gwangju City	Opo-eup	
Opo IC	오포 나들목	Sejong-Pocheon Expressway	Gwangju City	Opo-eup	Under construction
Gosan IC	고산 나들목	National Route 45 (Hoean-daero); Poeun-daero	Gwangju City	Opo-eup	National Route 45 overlap
Gwangnam High School	광남고등학교		Gwangju City	Gwangnam-dong	National Route 45 overlap
Taejeon JCT	태전 분기점	National Route 3 (Seongnam-Janghowon Motorway)	Gwangju City	Gwangnam-dong	National Route 45 overlap
Sinjangji IS	신장지삼거리	Sunam-ro	Gwangju City	Gwangnam-dong	National Route 45 overlap
Jangji IC	장지 나들목	National Route 3 (Gyeongchung-daero)	Gwangju City	Gwangnam-dong	National Route 45 overlap
Tanbeolma-eul	탄벌마을앞	Podori-ro	Gwangju City	Songjeong-dong	National Route 45 overlap
Beolwon IS	벌원 교차로	Ibaejae-ro; Pabal-ro	Gwangju City	Songjeong-dong	National Route 45 overlap
(Songjeong Overpass)	(송정육교)	Haengjeongtaun-ro	Gwangju City	Songjeong-dong	National Route 45 overlap
Gwangju City Hall	광주시청		Gwangju City	Songjeong-dong	National Route 45 overlap
Daeju Overpass	대주육교	Jungang-ro 335beon-gil	Gwangju City	Songjeong-dong	National Route 45 overlap
Songjeong IS	송정 교차로	Jungang-ro	Gwangju City	Songjeong-dong	National Route 45 overlap
Gyeonggi-Gwangju IC (Gwangju IC Entrance IS)	경기광주 나들목 (광주IC입구삼거리)	Jungbu Expressway; Haegong-ro	Gwangju City	Namhansanseong-myeon	National Route 45 overlap
Sangbeoncheon-ri IS	상번천리사거리	National Route 45; Prefectural Route 342 (Taeheojeong-ro)	Gwangju City	Namhansanseong-myeon	National Route 45 overlap Prefectural Route 342 overlap
Beoncheon 2 Bridge Gwangjiwon Elementary School	번천2교 광지원초등학교		Gwangju City	Namhansanseong-myeon	Prefectural Route 342 overlap
Namhansanseong Entrance IS	남한산성입구삼거리	Prefectural Route 342 (Namhansanseong-ro)	Gwangju City	Namhansanseong-myeon	Prefectural Route 342 overlap
Namhansanseong-myeon Office	남한산성면사무소		Gwangju City	Namhansanseong-myeon	
Eommi-ri Valley IS	엄미리계곡삼거리	Eommi-gil	Gwangju City	Namhansanseong-myeon	
Eungogae	은고개		Gwangju City	Namhansanseong-myeon	
Eungogae			Hanam City	Cheonhyeon-dong	
Eojinma-eul IS	어진마을 교차로	Hanam-daero 105beon-gil	Hanam City	Cheonhyeon-dong	
Seommal Entrance IS	섬말입구 교차로	Sangoknam-ro; Hanam-daero 166beon-gil	Hanam City	Cheonhyeon-dong	
Jungganmal IS	중간말 교차로	Hanam-daero 195beon-gil Hanam-daero 198beon-gil	Hanam City	Cheonhyeon-dong	
Dongsugyo IS	동수교 교차로	Sangok-ro	Hanam City	Cheonhyeon-dong	
Hanam Bus Garage Entrance	하남공영차고지입구	Hanam-daero 284beon-gil	Hanam City	Cheonhyeon-dong	
Sangok Elementary School Geomdansan Entrance	산곡초교검단산입구	Hanam-daero 302beon-gil	Hanam City	Cheonhyeon-dong	
Sangok IS	산곡 교차로	Sangokdong-ro	Hanam City	Cheonhyeon-dong	
Saeneung Entrance IS	새능입구 교차로	Sangokdong-ro	Hanam City	Cheonhyeon-dong	
Cheonhyeon-dong Community Center Entrance	천현동주민센터입구	Geomdansan-ro	Hanam City	Cheonhyeon-dong	
Registration Office Entrance IS	등기소입구 교차로	Geomdan-ro; Hanam-daero 545beon-gil	Hanam City	Cheonhyeon-dong	
Hanam IC (Cheonhyeon IS)	하남 나들목 (천현삼거리)	Jungbu Expressway	Hanam City	Cheonhyeon-dong	
Cheonhyeon IS	천현사거리	Cheonhyeon-ro	Hanam City	Cheonhyeon-dong	
Deokpung 1 Bridge Hanam City Hall	덕풍1교 하남시청		Hanam City	Sinjang-dong	
No name	(이름 없음)	Daecheong-ro; Hanam-daero 761beon-gil	Hanam City	Sinjang-dong	
Sinjang Elementary School	신장초교사거리	Sinpyeong-ro	Hanam City	Sinjang-dong	
Jano Apartment IS	자노아파트앞 교차로	Bongyang-ro; Suribuk-ro	Hanam City	Deokpung-dong	
Deokpung Police Station	덕풍파출소앞	Deokpungbuk-ro; Sinjang-ro	Hanam City	Deokpung-dong	
Deokpung Police Station		Deokpungbuk-ro; Sinjang-ro	Hanam City	Pungsan-dong	
No name	(이름 없음)	Deoksan-ro	Hanam City	Pungsan-dong	
Hwangsan IS	황산사거리	Misagangbyeon-daero; Jojeong-daero	Hanam City	Pungsan-dong	Continuation into Seoul

=== Seoul ===
Name	Hangul name	Connection	Location		Note
Sangil IC	상일 나들목	Seoul Ring Expressway	Seoul	Gangdong District	Gyeonggi Province - Seoul border line
Sangil 2 Bridge	상일2교	Sangil-ro; Chogwang-ro	Seoul	Gangdong District	
Seoul Sangil Elementary School	서울상일초등학교		Seoul	Gangdong District	
Saengtae Park IS	생태공원앞 교차로	Dongnam-ro	Seoul	Gangdong District	
Dunchon High School Entrance	둔촌고교입구	Myeongil-ro	Seoul	Gangdong District	
Gildong IS	길동사거리	Yangjae-daero	Seoul	Gangdong District	
Gangdong Sacred Heart Hospital IS	강동성심병원 교차로	Seongan-ro	Seoul	Gangdong District	
Gangdong station	강동역		Seoul	Gangdong District	
Cheonho IS (Cheonho station) (Cheonho Underpass)	천호사거리 (천호역) (천호지하차도)	Olympic-ro	Seoul	Gangdong District	
Cheonho University	천호대교남단	Olympic-daero	Seoul	Gangdong District	
Cheonho Bridge	천호대교		Seoul	Gangdong District	
Cheonho Bridge			Seoul	Gwangjin District	
North of Cheonho Bridge	천호대교북단	National Route 46 (Gangbyeon Expressway)	Seoul	Gwangjin District	National Route 46 overlap Continuation into Gyeonggi Province
Gwangjang IS (Gwangnaru station)	광장사거리 (광나루역)	Achasan-ro; Cheonho-daero	Seoul	Gwangjin District	National Route 46 overlap Continuation into Gyeonggi Province
Gwangjin Bridge IS	광진교삼거리	Gucheonmyeon-ro	Seoul	Gwangjin District	National Route 46 overlap Continuation into Gyeonggi Province
Sheraton Walkerhill Hotel	쉐라톤 워커힐호텔		Seoul	Gwangjin District	National Route 46 overlap Continuation into Gyeonggi Province

=== Gyeonggi Province (North Seoul) ===
Name	Hangul name	Connection	Location		Note
Achiul IS	아치울삼거리	Gangbyeonbuk-ro	Guri City	Gyomun-dong	National Route 46 overlap Seoul - Gyeonggi Province border line
Cosmos-gil IS	코스모스길삼거리	Koseumoseu-gil	Guri City	Gyomun-dong	National Route 46 overlap
Handarima-eul Entrance	한다리마을입구	Handari-gil 4beon-gil	Guri City	Gyomun-dong	National Route 46 overlap
Dorim IS (Guri Police Station)	도림삼거리 (구리경찰서)	Jangja-daero	Guri City	Gyomun-dong	National Route 46 overlap
Jeonggaksa Entrance	정각사입구	Imunan-ro	Guri City	Gyomun-dong	National Route 46 overlap
Guri City Hall Dorim Elementary School	구리시청 도림초등학교		Guri City	Gyomun-dong	National Route 46 overlap
Tax Office Entrance IS	세무서입구삼거리	Angol-ro	Guri City	Gyomun-dong	National Route 46 overlap
Samyook High School IS	삼육고등학교앞 교차로	Achasan-ro 487beon-gil	Guri City	Gyomun-dong	National Route 46 overlap
Gyomun IS	교문사거리	National Route 6 (Gyeongchun-ro)	Guri City	Gyomun-dong	National Route 46 overlap
Inchang Elementary School	인창초등학교앞	Inchang 2-ro	Guri City	Inchang-dong	National Route 46 overlap
Inchang Elementary School	인창초등학교		Guri City	Inchang-dong	National Route 46 overlap
Inchang IS	인창삼거리	Inchang 1-ro	Guri City	Inchang-dong	National Route 46 overlap
Seonglim Sport	성림스포츠앞	Eungdalmal-ro	Guri City	Inchang-dong	National Route 46 overlap
Wholesale Market IS	도매시장사거리	Geonwon-daero; Donggureung-ro 136beon-gil	Guri City	Donggu-dong	National Route 46 overlap
Guri IC	구리 나들목	Seoul Ring Expressway; Bukbu Expressway	Guri City	Donggu-dong	National Route 46 overlap
Public Cemetery Entrance	공설묘지입구	Sanmaru-ro	Guri City	Donggu-dong	National Route 46 overlap
Sano-dong IS	사노동 교차로	Donggureung-ro 389beon-gil Donggureung-ro 390beon-gil	Guri City	Donggu-dong	National Route 46 overlap
Sano IC	사노 나들목	National Route 47 (Geumgang-ro); Donggureung-ro	Guri City	Donggu-dong	National Route 46, National Route 47 overlap
Saro Bridge	사로교		Guri City	Donggu-dong	National Route 46, National Route 47 overlap
Saro Bridge			Namyangju City	Jingeon-eup	National Route 46, National Route 47 overlap
Jingwan IC	진관 나들목	National Route 46 (Gyeongchunbuk-ro)	Namyangju City	Jingeon-eup	National Route 46, National Route 47 overlap
Gujingwan IC	구진관 나들목	Prefectural Route 383 (Gyeongchunbuk-ro)	Namyangju City	Jingeon-eup	National Route 47 overlap
Sinwol IS	신월 교차로	Jingwan-ro 562beon-gil	Namyangju City	Jingeon-eup	National Route 47 overlap
Imsong IS	임송 교차로	Toegyewon-ro	Namyangju City	Jinjeop-eup	National Route 47 overlap
Naegok IC	내곡 나들목	National Route 47 (Geumgang-ro)	Namyangju City	Jinjeop-eup	National Route 47 overlap
Jeondochi Tunnel	전도치터널		Namyangju City	Jinjeop-eup	Right tunnel: Approximately 798m Left tunnel: Approximately 746m
Jeondochi Tunnel			Namyangju City	Byeollae-myeon	Right tunnel: Approximately 798m Left tunnel: Approximately 746m
Gwangjeon IC	광전 나들목	Songsan-ro	Namyangju City	Byeollae-myeon	
Cheonghak-ri Entrance IS	청학리입구 교차로	Songsan-ro 678beon-gil Songsan-ro 679beon-gil	Namyangju City	Byeollae-myeon	
Cheonghak Tunnel	청학터널		Namyangju City	Byeollae-myeon	Right tunnel: Approximately 203m Left tunnel: Approximately 173m
Cheonghak Bridge	청학교	Cheonghak-ro	Namyangju City	Byeollae-myeon	
Sutdolgogae	숫돌고개		Namyangju City	Byeollae-myeon	
Sutdolgogae			Uijeongbu City	Songsan-dong	
East Uijeongbu IC	동의정부 나들목	Sejong-Pocheon Expressway	Uijeongbu City	Songsan-dong	
Mangadae IS	만가대사거리	National Route 3 (Sinpyeonghwa-ro); Millak-ro	Uijeongbu City	Songsan-dong	
Solmoe Middle School Solmoe Elementary School	솔뫼중학교 솔뫼초등학교		Uijeongbu City	Songsan-dong	
306 Replacement Depot IS	306보충대앞 교차로	Yongin-ro; Simin-ro 416beon-gil	Uijeongbu City	Songsan-dong	
Youngseok High School attached to College of Education Dongguk University	동국사대부속 영석고등학교		Uijeongbu City	Songsan-dong	
Singok Overpass IS (Singok Overpass)	신곡고가 교차로 (신곡고가차도)	Geumsin-ro; Simin-ro	Uijeongbu City	Singok-dong	
Uijeongbu Paik General Hospital	의정부백병원		Uijeongbu City	Singok-dong	
No name	(이름 없음)	Chudong-ro	Uijeongbu City	Singok-dong	
Geumsin Bridge	금신교		Uijeongbu City	Singok-dong	
Geumsin Bridge			Uijeongbu City	Jageum-dong	
Geumsin IS (Geumsin Underpass)	금신 교차로 (금신지하차도)	Geumsin-ro; Hoguk-ro	Uijeongbu City	Jageum-dong	
No name	(이름 없음)	Saemal-ro	Uijeongbu City	Jageum-dong	
No name	(이름 없음)	Geumo-ro	Uijeongbu City	Jageum-dong	
No name	(이름 없음)	Cheongsa-ro	Uijeongbu City	Jageum-dong	
(North of Jail Bridge)	(자일교 북단)	Cheonbo-ro	Uijeongbu City	Jageum-dong	
License Test Center Entrance	면허시험장입구	Geumo-ro	Uijeongbu City	Jageum-dong	
Jageum IS	자금 교차로	National Route 3 (Sinpyeonghwa-ro)	Uijeongbu City	Jageum-dong	
Chukseokgogae (Chukseokryeong)	축석고개 (축석령)		Uijeongbu City	Jageum-dong	
Chukseokgogae (Chukseokryeong)			Pocheon City	Sohol-eup	
Chukseok IS	축석 교차로	Gwangneungsumogwon-ro; Millak-ro	Pocheon City	Sohol-eup	Prefectural Route 98 overlap
Chukseok Elementary School Entrance	축석초교입구	Muran-gil	Pocheon City	Sohol-eup	Prefectural Route 98 overlap
Sunae-dong Entrance	수내동입구	Hoguk-ro 171beon-gil	Pocheon City	Sohol-eup	Prefectural Route 98 overlap
Soheul IC	소흘 나들목	Sejong-Pocheon Expressway	Pocheon City	Sohol-eup	Prefectural Route 98 overlap
Mubongrima-eul Entrance	무봉리마을입구	Geochinbongi-gil	Pocheon City	Sohol-eup	Prefectural Route 98 overlap
Buinteo IS	부인터입구 교차로	Hoguk-ro 323beon-gil	Pocheon City	Sohol-eup	Prefectural Route 98 overlap
Buinteo IS	부인터사거리	Prefectural Route 98; Prefectural Route 360 (Buheung-ro)	Pocheon City	Sohol-eup	Prefectural Route 98, 360 overlap
Daebang Apartment Entrance	대방아파트입구	Hoguk-ro 429beon-gil	Pocheon City	Sohol-eup	Prefectural Route 360 overlap
Yongsanggol Entrance	용상골입구	Araennyongsang-gil; Hoguk-ro 484beon-gil	Pocheon City	Sohol-eup	Prefectural Route 360 overlap
Tongildae Entrance IS	통일대입구삼거리	Taebong-ro	Pocheon City	Sohol-eup	Prefectural Route 360 overlap
Sohol-eup Office IS	소흘읍사무소앞 교차로	Geombawi-gil	Pocheon City	Sohol-eup	Prefectural Route 360 overlap
Soheul-eup Office	소흘읍사무소		Pocheon City	Sohol-eup	Prefectural Route 360 overlap
Songu IS	송우삼거리	Solmoru-ro	Pocheon City	Sohol-eup	Prefectural Route 360 overlap
Chogapal-ri Entrance	초가팔리입구	Chogapal-ro; Solmoru-ro 58beon-gil	Pocheon City	Sohol-eup	Prefectural Route 360 overlap
Igapal-ri Entrance	이가팔리입구	Jugyeopsan-ro; Solmoru-ro 78beon-gil	Pocheon City	Sohol-eup	Prefectural Route 360; Former Prefectural Route 383
Hasongu IS	하송우삼거리	Solmoru-ro	Pocheon City	Sohol-eup	Prefectural Route 360 overlap
Hasongu IS	하송우사거리	Prefectural Route 56 (Hwahap-ro); Prefectural Route 360 (Gasan-ro)	Pocheon City	Sohol-eup	Prefectural Route 56, 360 overlap
Seolun3tong IS	설운3통 교차로	Hoguk-ro 883beon-gil	Pocheon City	Seondan-dong	Prefectural Route 56 overlap
E-mart Pocheon Store	이마트 포천점		Pocheon City	Seondan-dong	Prefectural Route 56 overlap
Seondan IC (Jangseunggeo-ri IS)	선단 나들목 (장승거리삼거리)	Sejong-Pocheon Expressway; Prefectural Route 364 (Samnyuksa-ro)	Pocheon City	Seondan-dong	Prefectural Route 56 overlap
Daejin University Entrance IS (Daejin University)	대진대입구 교차로 (대진대학교)		Pocheon City	Seondan-dong	Prefectural Route 56 overlap
No name	(이름 미상)	Prefectural Route 364	Pocheon City	Seondan-dong	Prefectural Route 56 overlap
Hallelujah Oratory	할렐루야기도원	Jeongjadong-gil	Pocheon City	Seondan-dong	Prefectural Route 56 overlap
Jajak-dong Entrance IS	자작동입구 교차로	Jajak-ro	Pocheon City	Seondan-dong	Prefectural Route 56 overlap
Eoryong3tong IS	어룡3통 교차로	Hoguk-ro 1331beon-gil	Pocheon City	Pocheon-dong	Prefectural Route 56 overlap
Eoryong2tong IS	어룡2통 교차로	Eoryong-gil	Pocheon City	Pocheon-dong	Prefectural Route 56 overlap
Eoryong1tong IS	어룡1통 교차로	Wangbang-ro	Pocheon City	Pocheon-dong	Prefectural Route 56 overlap
Pocheon IS	포천삼거리	Jungang-ro	Pocheon City	Pocheon-dong	Prefectural Route 56 overlap
Pocheon 1 Bridge	포천1교		Pocheon City	Pocheon-dong	Prefectural Route 56 overlap
Pocheon 1 Bridge			Pocheon City	Gunnae-myeon	Prefectural Route 56 overlap
Pocheon Stadium Pocheon Office of Education Pocheon Fire Station Pocheon Police Station	포천종합운동장 포천교육지원청 포천소방서 포천경찰서		Pocheon City	Gunnae-myeon	Prefectural Route 56 overlap
Gunnae IS	군내사거리	Prefectural Route 56 (Cheonggun-ro)	Pocheon City	Gunnae-myeon	Prefectural Route 56 overlap
Hannae IS	한내사거리	National Route 87 (Pocheon-ro)	Pocheon City	Gunnae-myeon	
Golmal Entrance IS	골말입구삼거리	Hoguk-ro 1664beon-gil	Pocheon City	Gunnae-myeon	
Women Hall Entrance	여성회관입구	Cheongseong-ro	Pocheon City	Gunnae-myeon	
Sinbuk IC	신북 나들목	Sejong-Pocheon Expressway	Pocheon City	Sinbuk-myeon	
Gusinbuk Bridge	구신북대교앞	Jungang-ro	Pocheon City	Sinbuk-myeon	
Teulmotima-eul Entrance	틀못이마을입구	Teulmonni-gil	Pocheon City	Sinbuk-myeon	
Sinbuk Bridge IS	신북대교삼거리	Jungang-ro	Pocheon City	Sinbuk-myeon	
Dokgokma-eul Entrance	독곡마을입구	Dokgok-gil	Pocheon City	Sinbuk-myeon	
Sinbuk-myeon Office	신북면사무소		Pocheon City	Sinbuk-myeon	
Sinbuk-myeon Office IS	신북면사무소앞 교차로	Prefectural Route 368 (Artvalley-ro) (Cheongsin-ro)	Pocheon City	Sinbuk-myeon	
Oeo-dong Entrance	외오동입구	Hoguk-ro 2122beon-gil	Pocheon City	Sinbuk-myeon	
Sinpocheona Apartment IS	신포천아파트앞삼거리		Pocheon City	Sinbuk-myeon	
Yokkol IS	요꼴사거리	Sinpyeong-ro; Hoguk-ro 2254beon-gil	Pocheon City	Sinbuk-myeon	
Mansegyo Complex IS	만세교공단 교차로	Hoguk-ro 2378beon-gil	Pocheon City	Sinbuk-myeon	
Mansegyo-ri IS	만세교리 교차로		Pocheon City	Sinbuk-myeon	
Manse Bridge	만세교		Pocheon City	Sinbuk-myeon	
Manse Bridge			Pocheon City	Yeongjung-myeon	
Mansegyo IS	만세교삼거리	National Route 37 (Sinnyeongil-ro); Yeongil-ro	Pocheon City	Yeongjung-myeon	National Route 37 overlap
Geumju 3-ri IS	금주3리 교차로	Hoguk-ro 2533beon-gil Hoguk-ro 2536beon-gil	Pocheon City	Yeongjung-myeon	National Route 37 overlap
Geosa 1-ri Entrance	거사1리입구	Baengnoju-gil; Hoguk-ro 2616beon-gil	Pocheon City	Yeongjung-myeon	National Route 37 overlap
Geumju 5-ri IS	금주5리 교차로	Hoguk-ro 2709beon-gil	Pocheon City	Yeongjung-myeon	National Route 37 overlap
Yangmun IS	양문 교차로	National Route 37	Pocheon City	Yeongjung-myeon	National Route 37 overlap
Yangmungomgogae IS	양문곰고개삼거리	Yangmun-ro	Pocheon City	Yeongjung-myeon	National Route 37 overlap
Yangmun IS	양문사거리	Meonjae-gil; Yangmun-ro 1-gil	Pocheon City	Yeongjung-myeon	National Route 37 overlap
Yangmun IS	양문삼거리	Yangmun-ro	Pocheon City	Yeongjung-myeon	National Route 37 overlap
Yangmun Industrial Park IS	양문공업단지 교차로	Yangmungongdan-ro	Pocheon City	Yeongjung-myeon	National Route 37 overlap
Yeongjung Bridge	영중교		Pocheon City	Yeongjung-myeon	National Route 37 overlap
Sinjang IS	신장삼거리	National Route 37; Prefectural Route 372 (Jeonnyeong-ro)	Pocheon City	Yeongjung-myeon	National Route 37 overlap Prefectural Route 372 overlap
Yeongjung Elementary School	영중초등학교		Pocheon City	Yeongjung-myeon	Prefectural Route 372 overlap
Seongdong 5-ri IS	성동5리 교차로	Hoguk-ro 3121beon-gil	Pocheon City	Yeongjung-myeon	Prefectural Route 372 overlap
Seongdong IS	성동삼거리	Prefectural Route 372 (Seongjang-ro)	Pocheon City	Yeongjung-myeon	Prefectural Route 372 overlap
Seongdong 2-ri IS	성동2리 교차로	Hoguk-ro 3296beon-gil	Pocheon City	Yeongjung-myeon	
Soetgolma-eul Entrance	쇳골마을입구	Hoguk-ro 3497beon-gil	Pocheon City	Yeongbuk-myeon	
Yami IS	야미사거리	Hoguk-ro 3549beon-gil Hoguk-ro 3552beon-gil	Pocheon City	Yeongbuk-myeon	
Munam-ri IS	문암리 교차로	Hoguk-ro 3725beon-gil	Pocheon City	Yeongbuk-myeon	
Uncheon 1 IS	운천1 교차로	Yeongbuk-ro; Hoguk-ro 3791beon-gil	Pocheon City	Yeongbuk-myeon	
Uncheon 2 IS	운천2 교차로	Prefectural Route 78 (Munam-ro) (Banggol-gil)	Pocheon City	Yeongbuk-myeon	
Uncheon 3 IS	운천3 교차로	Uncheon-ro; Gureumnae-gil	Pocheon City	Yeongbuk-myeon	
Uncheon 4 IS	운천4 교차로	Yeongbuk-ro	Pocheon City	Yeongbuk-myeon	
Songjeong Checkpoint IS	송정검문소 교차로	Prefectural Route 387 (Bukwon-ro)	Pocheon City	Yeongbuk-myeon	Prefectural Route 387 overlap
Jail 1-ri IS	자일1리 교차로	Prefectural Route 387 (Hoguk-ro 4350beon-gil)	Pocheon City	Yeongbuk-myeon	Prefectural Route 387 overlap
Gyeong Bridge	경교		Pocheon City	Yeongbuk-myeon	Continuation into Gangwon Province

=== Gangwon Province ===
Name	Hangul name	Connection	Location		Note
Gyeong Bridge	경교		Cheorwon County	Galmal-eup	Gyeonggi Province - Gangwon Province border line
Yeonbongje IS	연봉제삼거리	Myeongseong-ro	Cheorwon County	Galmal-eup	
Deureuni IS	드르니 교차로	Guntan-ro; Deureuni-gil	Cheorwon County	Galmal-eup	
Guntan IS	군탄사거리	Galmal-ro; Myeongseong-ro	Cheorwon County	Galmal-eup	
Munhye IS	문혜삼거리	Durumi-ro	Cheorwon County	Galmal-eup	
Munhye IS	문혜 교차로	Prefectural Route 463 (Taebong-ro)	Cheorwon County	Galmal-eup	
Munhye Underpass	문혜지하차도		Cheorwon County	Galmal-eup	
Jigyeong IS	지경 교차로	Prefectural Route 464 (Cheongyang-ro)	Cheorwon County	Galmal-eup	
Jigyeong Bridge	지경교		Cheorwon County	Galmal-eup	
Yeondong IS	연동 교차로	Yeondong-gil	Cheorwon County	Gimhwa-eup	
Cheongyang IS	청양 교차로	Cheongyang-ro	Cheorwon County	Gimhwa-eup	
Cheongha IS	청하 교차로	Cheonghagol-gil	Cheorwon County	Gimhwa-eup	
Gimhwa Industrial Complex	김화농공단지	Oegol-gil	Cheorwon County	Gimhwa-eup	
Mangyeong IS	만경 교차로	Cheongyang-ro	Cheorwon County	Gimhwa-eup	
Gimhwa Bridge	김화교		Cheorwon County	Gimhwa-eup	
Gimhwa IS	김화 교차로	National Route 47 (Gimhwa-ro)	Cheorwon County	Gimhwa-eup	National Route 56 overlap
Haksa IS	학사 교차로	National Route 56 (Hoguk-ro)	Cheorwon County	Gimhwa-eup	National Route 56 overlap
Eupnae Bridge Saengchang-ri	읍내교 생창리		Cheorwon County	Gimhwa-eup	
Eupnae IS	읍내삼거리	National Route 5 (Yeongseo-ro)	Cheorwon County	Gimhwa-eup	
Amjeong-ri	암정리		Cheorwon County	Gimhwa-eup	Civilian Control Zone (CCZ)
Gambong-ri	감봉리		Cheorwon County	Gimhwa-eup	Civilian Control Zone (CCZ)
Gwangsam-ri	광삼리		Cheorwon County	Geundong-myeon	Civilian Control Zone (CCZ)
Bangtong-ri	방통리		Cheorwon County	Geundong-myeon	Civilian Control Zone (CCZ)
Continuation into North Korea
