= National Route 23 (South Korea) =

Road in South Korea

National Route 23
- 국도 제23호선

Route information
- Length: 395.7 km (245.9 mi)
- Existed: August 31, 1971–present

Major junctions
- South end: Gangjin County, South Jeolla Province
- North end: Dongnam District, Cheonan, South Chungcheong Province

Location
- Country: South Korea

Highway system
- Highway systems of South Korea; Expressways; National; Local

National Route 23 is a national highway in South Korea connects Gangjin County to Dongnam District, Cheonan. It established on August 31, 1971.

== History ==
- 1967: Designated as National Route 23, Mokpo ~ Cheonan line, as a second-class national highway.
- August 31, 1971: Redesignated as "National Route 23, Mokpo ~ Cheonan line" under the National Highway Designation Decree.
- September 8, 1973: Due to road realignment, the 1.64 km section in Buchang-dong, Nonsan-eup, Nonsan County was changed to a 1.44 km section between Buchang-dong and Hwaji-dong in Nonsan-eup.
- October 1, 1975: Opened a 2.24 km section between Namdang-ri, Hamyeol-myeon, Iksan County ~ Hongsa-ri, Baeksan-myeon, Gimje County, and abolished the existing 2.85 km section.
- December 30, 1976: Opened a 1.194 km section between Yochon-ri and Gyodong-ri, Gimje-eup, Gimje County, and abolished the existing 1.2 km section.
- July 31, 1980: Opened a 26.2 km section between Dongsari, Heungdeok-myeon, Gochang County ~ Singi-ri, Haengan-myeon, Buan County.
- March 14, 1981: Starting point changed from 'Mokpo-si, Jeollanam-do' to 'Daegu-myeon, Gangjin County, Jeollanam-do'. The line became 'Maryang ~ Cheonan' instead of 'Mokpo ~ Cheonan'.
- May 30, 1981: Road zone changed to the modified 94 km section under the amendment of Presidential Decree No. 10247, National Highway Designation Decree.
- June 24, 1981: Starting point changed from Daegu-myeon, Gangjin County to Gangjin-eup, Gangjin County, becoming Route 23, Gangjin ~ Cheonan line.
- August 12, 1981: Road zone changed to the modified 49 km section under the amendment of Presidential Decree No. 10371, National Highway Designation Decree.
- August 17, 1981: Opened newly upgraded national highway sections: 66.35 km from Dongsung-ri, Gangjin-eup, Gangjin County ~ Chungnyeol-ri, Jangheung-eup, Jangheung County; 50.65 km from Geonsan-ri, Jangheung-eup, Jangheung County ~ Sanjeong-ri, Yeongsanpo-eup, Naju County; 15.45 km from Jangsan-ri, Wanggok-myeon, Naju County ~ Unsan-ri, Donggang-myeon; and 4.9 km from Gokcham-ri, Hakgyo-eup, Hampyeong County ~ Sagori.
- January 19, 1993: Opened Hampyeong bypass and Hampyeong ~ Jangseong road (2.9 km section from Gigak-ri to Daedeok-ri, Hampyeong-eup, Hampyeong County).
- March 31, 1999: Opened 3.14 km Daedeok bypass (Jamduri ~ Yeonji-ri, Daedeok-eup, Jangheung County).
- July 8, 1999: Opened 3.16 km Seongsong bypass (Amchi-ri ~ Hakcheon-ri, Seongsong-myeon, Gochang County), abolished existing 2.8 km section.
- December 23, 1999: Opened expanded 46.3 km four-lane section from Hwabon-ri, Jeongan-myeon, Gongju-si ~ Buchang-dong, Nonsan-si.
- December 28, 1999: Opened expanded 21.3 km four-lane section from Sinyong-dong, Iksan-si ~ boundary with Ganggyeong-eup.
- December 31, 1999: Opened expanded 5.26 km section from Sagori, Hakgyo-myeon, Hampyeong County ~ Gigak-ri, Hampyeong-eup, abolished existing section.
- January 10, 2000: Opened expanded 30.44 km section from Buchang-dong, Nonsan-si ~ Sohak-dong, Gongju-si.
- April 2000: Opened 2.84 km Chillyang bypass (Yeongbok-ri ~ Jang-gye-ri, Chillyang-myeon, Gangjin County), abolished existing 1.95 km section.
- November 11, 2000: Opened expanded 13.48 km section from Sohak-dong, Gongju-si ~ Hwabon-ri, Jeongan-myeon.
- January 1, 2001: Opened 1.77 km Shingwang bypass (Samdeok-ri ~ Wolam-ri, Shingwang-myeon, Hampyeong County), abolished existing 1.4 km section.
- October 15, 2001: Opened expanded 8.84 km four-lane section from Samgye-ri, Daedeok-myeon, Jangseong County ~ Chilbo-ri, Shingwang-myeon, Hampyeong County.
- December 21, 2001: Opened expanded 7.87 km four-lane section from Chilbo-ri, Shingwang-myeon, Hampyeong County ~ Sinchon-ri, Shingwang-myeon.
- December 31, 2001: Opened expanded 2.56 km four-lane section from Sinchon-ri ~ Gigak-ri, Hampyeong-eup, Hampyeong County.
- December 27, 2002: Opened expanded 6.2 km four-lane section from Gokcham-ri, Hakgyo-eup, Hampyeong County ~ Amchi-ri, Seongsong-myeon, Gochang County.
- December 26, 2003: Opened expanded 8.6 km four-lane section from Amchi-ri, Seongsong-myeon, Gochang County ~ Bongam-ri, Seongsong-myeon.
- December 31, 2004: Opened expanded 8.08 km four-lane section from Bongam-ri, Seongsong-myeon, Gochang County ~ Seongsan-ri, Haengan-myeon, Buan County.
- December 29, 2005: Opened expanded 8.8 km four-lane section from Seongsan-ri, Haengan-myeon, Buan County ~ Singi-ri, Haengan-myeon.
- December 28, 2006: Opened expanded 11.7 km four-lane section from Singi-ri, Haengan-myeon, Buan County ~ Geonsan-ri, Jangheung-eup, Jangheung County.
- December 31, 2007: Opened expanded 8.6 km four-lane section from Chungnyeol-ri, Jangheung-eup, Jangheung County ~ Geonsan-ri.
- December 31, 2008: Opened expanded 4.1 km four-lane section from Dongsung-ri, Gangjin-eup, Gangjin County ~ Chungnyeol-ri, Jangheung-eup.
- December 30, 2009: Opened expanded 6.7 km four-lane section from Namdang-ri, Hamyeol-myeon, Iksan-si ~ Hongsa-ri, Baeksan-myeon, Gimje-si.
- December 30, 2010: Opened expanded 6.48 km four-lane section from Yeonji-ri, Daedeok-myeon, Jangseong County ~ Samgye-ri, Daedeok-myeon.
- December 31, 2011: Opened expanded 4.44 km four-lane section from Sanjeong-ri, Yeongsanpo-eup, Naju-si ~ Jangsan-ri, Wanggok-myeon.
- December 28, 2012: Opened expanded 5.42 km four-lane section from Unsan-ri, Donggang-myeon, Naju-si ~ Gokcham-ri, Hakgyo-eup, Hampyeong County.
- December 27, 2013: Opened expanded 4.39 km four-lane section from Jang-gye-ri, Chillyang-myeon, Gangjin County ~ Amchi-ri, Seongsong-myeon, Gochang County.
- December 30, 2014: Opened expanded 8.3 km four-lane section from Geonsan-ri, Jangheung-eup, Jangheung County ~ Chungnyeol-ri.
- December 30, 2015: Opened expanded 10.1 km four-lane section from Chillyang-myeon, Gangjin County ~ Jangheung-eup, Jangheung County.
- December 29, 2016: Opened expanded 6.9 km four-lane section from Baeksan-myeon, Gimje-si ~ Donggok-myeon, Iksan-si.
- December 28, 2017: Opened expanded 4.79 km four-lane section from Donggok-myeon, Iksan-si ~ Namdang-ri, Hamyeol-myeon, Iksan-si.
- December 28, 2018: Opened expanded 4.69 km four-lane section from Jangsan-ri, Wanggok-myeon, Naju-si ~ Unsan-ri, Donggang-myeon.
- December 31, 2019: Opened expanded 8.2 km four-lane section from Sanjeong-ri, Yeongsanpo-eup, Naju-si ~ Jangsan-ri, Wanggok-myeon.
- December 29, 2020: Opened expanded 3.8 km four-lane section from Hongsa-ri, Baeksan-myeon, Gimje-si ~ Baeksan-myeon.
- January 1, 2021: The section from Uljin to Hupo Port (18.7 km) was transferred to National Route 7.
- January 1, 2022: The section from Donghae to Mukho (5.3 km) was transferred to National Route 7.
- January 1, 2023: The section from Samcheok to Dogye (17.9 km) was transferred to National Route 7.
- January 1, 2024: The section from Sokcho to Yangyang (19.0 km) was transferred to National Route 7.

== Main stopovers ==
South Jeolla Province

- Gangjin County - Jangheung County - Yeongam County - Naju - Hampyeong County - Yeonggwang County

North Jeolla Province

- Gochang County

South Jeolla Province

- Yeonggwang County

North Jeolla Province

- Gochang County - Buan County - Gimje - Iksan

South Chungcheong Province

- Nonsan - Gongju - Cheonan

Sejong City

- Jeonui-myeon

South Chungcheong Province

- Cheonan

Sejong City

- Sojeong-myeon

South Chungcheong Province

- Cheonan

== Major intersections ==
- (■): Motorway

IS: Intersection, IC: Interchange

=== South Jeolla Province ===
Name	Hangul name	Connection	Location		Note
Dongseong IS	동성사거리	Boeun-ro; Hyanggyo-ro	Gangjin County	Gangjin-eup	Terminus
Mokri Bridge	목리교		Gangjin County	Gangjin-eup	
Mokri Bridge			Gangjin County	Gundong-myeon	
Mokri IS	목리 교차로	National Route 2 National Route 18 (Noksaek-ro)	Gangjin County	Gundong-myeon	
Samsin IS	삼신삼거리	Seokgyo-ro	Gangjin County	Gundong-myeon	
Chilyang-myeon sojaeji	칠량면소재지	Prefectural Route 827 (Chilgwan-ro)	Gangjin County	Chilyang-myeon	
Chilyang-myeon Janggye-ri	칠량면장계리	Janggye-ro	Gangjin County	Chilyang-myeon	
Gangjin Ceramic Art School	강진도예학교	Prefectural Route 819 (Jungjeo-gil)	Gangjin County	Daegu-myeon	Prefectural Route 819 overlap
Misan IS	미산삼거리	Misan-gil; Cheongjachon-gil	Gangjin County	Daegu-myeon	Prefectural Route 819 overlap
Sudong Bridge	수동교	Prefectural Route 819 (Dae-daero)	Gangjin County	Daegu-myeon	Prefectural Route 819 overlap
Gangjin Daegu Middle School Daegu Elementary School	강진대구중학교 대구초등학교		Gangjin County	Daegu-myeon	
Maryang IS	마량 교차로	National Route 77 (Gogeum-ro)	Gangjin County	Maryang-myeon	National Route 77 overlap
Yeongdong IS	영동삼거리	Mihang-ro	Gangjin County	Maryang-myeon	National Route 77 overlap
Sukma IS	숙마삼거리	Samma-ro	Gangjin County	Maryang-myeon	National Route 77 overlap
Habuk Bridge	하분교		Gangjin County	Maryang-myeon	National Route 77 overlap
Habuk Bridge			Jangheung County	Daedeok-eup	National Route 77 overlap
Sinri IS	신리삼거리	Sinriyongam-ro	Jangheung County	Daedeok-eup	National Route 77 overlap
No name	(이름 없음)	Docheongsinwol-ro	Jangheung County	Daedeok-eup	National Route 77 overlap
Yeonji IS	연지 교차로	Prefectural Route 819 (Hoejin-ro)	Jangheung County	Daedeok-eup	National Route 77 overlap
Gwanheung IS	관흥삼거리	Gwanheunghoejin-ro	Jangheung County	Gwansan-eup	National Route 77 overlap
Samsan seawall IS	삼산방조제 교차로	Samsan-ro	Jangheung County	Gwansan-eup	National Route 77 overlap
Gwansannam Elementary School	관산남초등학교		Jangheung County	Gwansan-eup	National Route 77 overlap
Bangchon IS	방촌삼거리	Bangchon-gil; Bangchon 1-gil	Jangheung County	Gwansan-eup	National Route 77 overlap
Bangchon IS	방촌사거리	Gwansan-ro; Cheongwansan-gil	Jangheung County	Gwansan-eup	National Route 77 overlap
No name	(이름 없음)	Prefectural Route 827 (Jeongnamjin-ro)	Jangheung County	Gwansan-eup	National Route 77 overlap
Solchijae	솔치재		Jangheung County	Gwansan-eup	National Route 77 overlap
Solchijae			Jangheung County	Yongsan-myeon	National Route 77 overlap
Solchijae IS	솔치재 교차로	Gwansan-ro	Jangheung County	Yongsan-myeon	National Route 77 overlap
Jeopjeong IS	접정삼거리	Jeopjeongnampo-ro	Jangheung County	Yongsan-myeon	National Route 77 overlap
Yongsan Elementary School Yongsan-myeon Office	용산초등학교 용산면사무소		Jangheung County	Yongsan-myeon	National Route 77 overlap
Yongsan IS	용산삼거리	National Route 77 (Yongan-ro)	Jangheung County	Yongsan-myeon	National Route 77 overlap
Korean black hackerry in Yongsan-myeon, Jangheung Jangheung Prison	장흥 어산리 푸조나무 장흥교도소		Jangheung County	Yongsan-myeon	
Jayuljae	자율재		Jangheung County	Yongsan-myeon	
Sunji Bridge	순지교		Jangheung County	Yongsan-myeon	
Sunji Bridge			Jangheung County	Jangheung-eup	
Sunji IS	순지 교차로	National Route 2 National Route 18; Prefectural Route 55 (Noksaek-ro)	Jangheung County	Jangheung-eup	Prefectural Route 55 overlap
Sunji IS	순지삼거리	Jinheung-ro	Jangheung County	Jangheung-eup	Prefectural Route 55 overlap
Jangheungnam Elementary School	장흥남초등학교		Jangheung County	Jangheung-eup	Prefectural Route 55 overlap
Chungyeol IS	충열삼거리	Prefectural Route 835 (Janggang-ro)	Jangheung County	Jangheung-eup	Prefectural Route 55 overlap
Jangheung Stadium	장흥공설운동장		Jangheung County	Jangheung-eup	Prefectural Route 55 overlap
Sinnamoeri IS	신남외리삼거리	Chilgeoriyeyang-ro	Jangheung County	Jangheung-eup	Prefectural Route 55 overlap
Jangheung Bridge	장흥대교		Jangheung County	Jangheung-eup	Prefectural Route 55 overlap
Geonsan5gu IS	건산5구삼거리	Hongseong-ro; Pyeonghwasingi 1-gil	Jangheung County	Jangheung-eup	Prefectural Route 55 overlap
Jangheunggyo IS	장흥교사거리	Jangheung-ro; Chilgeoriyeyang-ro	Jangheung County	Jangheung-eup	Prefectural Route 55 overlap
Geonsan7gu IS	건산7구삼거리	Bukbu-ro	Jangheung County	Jangheung-eup	Prefectural Route 55 overlap
Jatdu IS	잣두삼거리	Donggyo-ro	Jangheung County	Jangheung-eup	Prefectural Route 55 overlap
Jangheung IC (Jangheung IC IS)	장흥 나들목 (장흥IC 교차로)	Namhae Expressway	Jangheung County	Jangheung-eup	Prefectural Route 55 overlap
Busan Bridge	부산교		Jangheung County	Jangheung-eup	Prefectural Route 55 overlap
Busan Bridge			Jangheung County	Busan-myeon	Prefectural Route 55 overlap
Busan IS	부산사거리	Naeanguryong-gil; Jidong 1-gil	Jangheung County	Busan-myeon	Prefectural Route 55 overlap
Simcheon IS	심천삼거리	Simcheongongwon-gil	Jangheung County	Busan-myeon	Prefectural Route 55 overlap
Simcheon Bridge	심천교		Jangheung County	Busan-myeon	Prefectural Route 55 overlap
Jicheon IS	지천삼거리	Jicheon-gil	Jangheung County	Busan-myeon	Prefectural Route 55 overlap
Jicheon Bridge	지천교		Jangheung County	Busan-myeon	Prefectural Route 55 overlap
Jicheon Tunnel	지천터널		Jangheung County	Busan-myeon	Prefectural Route 55 overlap Approximately 935m
Jicheon Tunnel			Jangheung County	Yuchi-myeon	Prefectural Route 55 overlap Approximately 935m
Neukryong IS	늑룡삼거리	Prefectural Route 820 (Pijae-ro)	Jangheung County	Yuchi-myeon	Prefectural Route 55 overlap
Neukryong Bridge	늑룡교		Jangheung County	Yuchi-myeon	Prefectural Route 55 overlap
Majeong IS	마정삼거리	Majeong-gil	Jangheung County	Yuchi-myeon	Prefectural Route 55 overlap
Sinpung IS	신풍삼거리	Sinpungsindeok-ro; Yuchi-ro	Jangheung County	Yuchi-myeon	Prefectural Route 55 overlap
Gwandong IS	관동 교차로	Bamjae-ro	Jangheung County	Yuchi-myeon	Prefectural Route 55 overlap
Namsong IS	남송삼거리	Namsong-gil; Naesan-gil	Yeongam County	Geumjeong-myeon	Prefectural Route 55 overlap
Geumjeong Elementary School Yeongam Geumjeong Middle School	금정초등학교 영암금정중학교		Yeongam County	Geumjeong-myeon	Prefectural Route 55 overlap
Yongheung IS	용흥삼거리	Prefectural Route 819 (Yeounjae-ro)	Yeongam County	Geumjeong-myeon	Prefectural Route 55 overlap
Seoksan IS	석산삼거리	Singeum-ro	Yeongam County	Geumjeong-myeon	Prefectural Route 55 overlap
Geumdae IS	금대 교차로	Yangwa-gil	Yeongam County	Geumjeong-myeon	Prefectural Route 55 overlap
Hwadong IS	화동 교차로	Seongsandeoksan-gil; Seongsanhwadong-gil	Naju City	Seji-myeon	Prefectural Route 55 overlap
Obong IS	오봉 교차로	Dongchang-ro	Naju City	Seji-myeon	Prefectural Route 55 overlap
Seji Tunnel	세지터널		Naju City	Seji-myeon	Prefectural Route 55 overlap Right tunnel: Approximately 366m Left tunnel: Approximately 358m
Seji IS	세지 교차로	Prefectural Route 55; Prefectural Route 820 (Dongchang-ro)	Naju City	Seji-myeon	Prefectural Route 55 overlap
Daesan IS	대산 교차로	Dongchang-ro	Naju City	Seji-myeon	
Budeok IS	부덕 교차로	National Route 1 Prefectural Route 49; Prefectural Route 60 (Bichgaramjangseong-ro)	Naju City	Yeongsan-dong	
Yongsan Jugong Apartment IS	용산주공아파트삼거리	Prefectural Route 818 (Bonghwang-ro)	Naju City	Yeongsan-dong	
Jeonnam Foreign Language High School	전남외국어고등학교		Naju City	Yeongsan-dong	
Fornt of Foreign Language	외국어고앞	Prefectural Route 49 (Yeongna-ro); Gamatae-gil	Naju City	Yeongsan-dong	Prefectural Route 49 overlap
Gwangshin Express	광신여객		Naju City	Yeongsan-dong	Prefectural Route 49 overlap
Ichang-dong IS	이창동삼거리	National Route 13 (Yehyang-ro)	Naju City	Ichang-dong	National Route 13 overlap Prefectural Route 49 overlap
Yeongsanpo Public Bus Terminal	영산포공용버스터미널		Naju City	Ichang-dong	National Route 13 overlap Prefectural Route 49 overlap
Ichangtaekji IS	이창택지삼거리	Pungmulsijang 1-gil	Naju City	Ichang-dong	National Route 13 overlap Prefectural Route 49 overlap
Ungok Bridge	운곡교		Naju City	Ichang-dong	National Route 13 overlap Prefectural Route 49 overlap
Ungok Bridge			Naju City	Wanggok-myeon	National Route 13 overlap Prefectural Route 49 overlap
Jangsan IS (Jangsan Viaduct)	장산사거리 (장산고가교)	National Route 13 (Yehyang-ro)	Naju City	Wanggok-myeon	National Route 13 overlap Prefectural Route 49 overlap
Naju Industrial Park IS	나주지방산단 교차로	Dongsunonggongdanji-gil	Naju City	Ichang-dong	Prefectural Route 49 overlap
Dongsu IS	동수 교차로	National Route 1 Prefectural Route 49; Prefectural Route 60 (Bichgaramjangseong-ro)	Naju City	Ichang-dong	Prefectural Route 49 overlap
Dongryeong IS	동령 교차로		Naju City	Wanggok-myeon	Under construction
Wangok Elementary School Wolcheon Health Clinic	왕곡초등학교 월천보건진료소		Naju City	Wanggok-myeon	Prefectural Route 49 overlap
Bakpo IS	박포삼거리	Musuk-ro; Hwajeong-ro	Naju City	Wanggok-myeon	Prefectural Route 49 overlap
Boksachori IS	복사초리삼거리	Prefectural Route 821 (Jami-ro)	Naju City	Gongsan-myeon	Prefectural Route 49 overlap
Geumgok IS	금곡 교차로	Gongsan-ro; Wongeumgok-gil	Naju City	Gongsan-myeon	Prefectural Route 49 overlap
Gongsan IS	공산 교차로	Prefectural Route 801 (Mahan-ro)	Naju City	Gongsan-myeon	Prefectural Route 49 overlap
Idong IS	이동 교차로	Gongsan-ro	Naju City	Gongsan-myeon	Prefectural Route 49 overlap
Hudong IS	후동사거리	Prefectural Route 49 (Donggang-ro)	Naju City	Donggang-myeon	Prefectural Route 49 overlap
Byeongban IS	병반사거리	Seongji-gil; Indong-gil	Naju City	Donggang-myeon	
Yangji IS	양지사거리	Gayang-ro; Baengnyeonsan-ro	Naju City	Donggang-myeon	
Donggang Bridge	동강교		Naju City	Donggang-myeon	
Donggang Bridge			Hampyeong County	Hakgyo-myeon	Prefectural Route 825 overlap
Hakgyo-myeon Entrance IS	학교면입구 교차로	Hakdari-gil	Hampyeong County	Hakgyo-myeon	Prefectural Route 825 overlap
Hakgyo IS	학교사거리	National Route 1 Prefectural Route 60; Prefectural Route 825 (Yeongsan-ro)	Hampyeong County	Hakgyo-myeon	Prefectural Route 825 overlap
Hakgyo Bus Terminal	학교버스터미널		Hampyeong County	Hakgyo-myeon	
Geomjeong IS	검정오거리	National Route 24 (Hamjang-ro)	Hampyeong County	Hampyeong-eup	
Gigak IS	기각사거리	Yeongsu-gil	Hampyeong County	Hampyeong-eup	
Baekgok IS	백곡 교차로	Prefectural Route 815 (Namil-gil)	Hampyeong County	Hampyeong-eup	Connected with Daeduk IS
Yangnim IS	양림 교차로	Jupo-ro; Yangnim-gil	Hampyeong County	Hampyeong-eup	
Hampyeong IC	함평 나들목	Seohaean Expressway	Hampyeong County	Hampyeong-eup	
Hampyeong High School	함평고등학교		Hampyeong County	Hampyeong-eup	
Geumsan IS	금산 교차로	Prefectural Route 808 (Sonmu-ro)	Hampyeong County	Daedong-myeon	
Yucheon IS	유천 교차로	Hakdong-ro	Hampyeong County	Singwang-myeon	Connected with Gadeok IS
Eco Park IS	생태공원 교차로	Hakdong-ro	Hampyeong County	Singwang-myeon	
Jangsan IS	장산 교차로	Hakdong-ro; Jangsan-gil	Hampyeong County	Singwang-myeon	
Singwang Overpass	신광육교	Deogil-gil	Hampyeong County	Singwang-myeon	
No name	(이름 없음)	Prefectural Route 838 (Singwangjungang-gil)	Hampyeong County	Singwang-myeon	Prefectural Route 838 overlap
Wonsan IS	원산삼거리	Prefectural Route 838 (Sinhae-ro)	Hampyeong County	Singwang-myeon	Prefectural Route 838 overlap
Singwang-myeon Hamjeong-ri IS	신광면함정리 교차로	Sammu-gil	Hampyeong County	Singwang-myeon	
Yeonhwa IS	연화삼거리	Ilgang-ro	Hampyeong County	Singwang-myeon	
Anmaeng IS	안맹삼거리	Ganghang-ro	Yeonggwang County	Bulgap-myeon	
Noksan IS	녹산사거리	Gunbul-ro; Bangma-ro	Yeonggwang County	Bulgap-myeon	
Gasa IS	가사삼거리	Ganam-ro	Yeonggwang County	Gunseo-myeon	
Noksa IS	녹사 교차로	National Route 22 (Yeonggwang-ro)	Yeonggwang County	Yeonggwang-eup	
Hakjeong IS	학정사거리	Jungang-ro	Yeonggwang County	Yeonggwang-eup	
Yeonggwang Middle School Yeonggwang High School	영광중학교 영광고등학교		Yeonggwang County	Yeonggwang-eup	
Hanjeon IS	한전사거리	Prefectural Route 808 (Cheonnyeon-ro)	Yeonggwang County	Yeonggwang-eup	
Terminal IS	터미널사거리	Sinnam-ro	Yeonggwang County	Yeonggwang-eup	
Danju IS	단주사거리	Yeongdae-ro; Wolhyeon-ro	Yeonggwang County	Yeonggwang-eup	Connected with Prefectural Route 844
General Hospital IS (Yeonggwang Medical Center)	종합병원삼거리 (영광종합병원)	Waryong-ro	Yeonggwang County	Yeonggwang-eup	
Wolpyeong IS	월평 교차로		Yeonggwang County	Yeonggwang-eup	Under construction
Gitbongjae IS (Gitbong IS)	깃봉재삼거리 (깃봉 교차로)	Myoryang-ro	Yeonggwang County	Yeonggwang-eup	
Upyeong IS	우평 교차로		Yeonggwang County	Yeonggwang-eup	
Yeonggwang IC Yeonggwang IC IS (Wonheung IS)	영광 나들목 영광IC 삼거리 (원흥 교차로)	Seohaean Expressway	Yeonggwang County	Yeonggwang-eup	
Jangbo IS	장보사거리	Prefectural Route 816 (Yeongjang-ro)	Yeonggwang County	Daema-myeon	
Goryeong Bridge	고령교		Yeonggwang County	Daema-myeon	
Goryeong Bridge			Gochang County	Daesan-myeon	North Jeolla Province section
Goryeong IS	고령 교차로		Gochang County	Daesan-myeon	South Jeolla Province section Under construction
Yaksan IS	약산 교차로		Gochang County	Daesan-myeon	South Jeolla Province section Under construction
Oseong IS	오성 교차로		Gochang County	Daesan-myeon	South Jeolla Province section Under construction
Chunsan IS	춘산 교차로	Daeseong-ro	Yeonggwang County	Daema-myeon	
Honggyo IS	홍교 교차로	Prefectural Route 734 (Honggyo-ro)	Yeonggwang County	Daema-myeon	Continuation into North Jeolla Province

=== North Jeolla Province ===
Name	Hangul name	Connection	Location		Note
Oewon IS	외원 교차로	Daeseong-ro	Gochang County	Seongsong-myeon	South Jeolla Province - North Jeolla Province border line
Seongsong IS	성송 교차로	Sonhwajung-ro	Gochang County	Seongsong-myeon	
Eorim IS	어림삼거리	Daeseong-ro	Gochang County	Seongsong-myeon	
Hakcheon IS	학천삼거리	Hakcheon-ro	Gochang County	Seongsong-myeon	
South Gochang IC (South Gochang IS)	남고창 나들목 (남고창 교차로)	Gochang-Damyang Expressway	Gochang County	Gosu-myeon	
Gosu IS	고수삼거리	Gosu-ro	Gochang County	Gosu-myeon	
Gosu-myeon Office	고수면사무소		Gochang County	Gosu-myeon	
Deoksan IS	덕산삼거리	Junggeoridangsan-ro	Gochang County	Gochang-eup	
Eupnae IS	읍내사거리	Nokdu-ro; Dongni-ro	Gochang County	Gochang-eup	
Eupnae IS	읍내 교차로	Jungang-ro	Gochang County	Gochang-eup	Connected with Gochang IC
Seokgyo IS	석교사거리	Jeonbongjun-ro; Soban 3-gil Soban 7-gil	Gochang County	Gochang-eup	
Seongdu IS	성두 교차로	Prefectural Route 15 (Dongseo-daero)	Gochang County	Gochang-eup	
Seongdu IS	성두삼거리	Moyangseong-ro	Gochang County	Gochang-eup	
Segok IS	세곡삼거리	Prefectural Route 708 (Wangnim-ro)	Gochang County	Sinrim-myeon	
Sacheon IS	사천삼거리	Seonun-daero	Gochang County	Heungdeok-myeon	
(Mokhwa Bridge)	(목화교)	National Route 22 (Seonun-daero)	Gochang County	Heungdeok-myeon	National Route 22 overlap
Mokhwa IS	목화 교차로	Heungdeok-ro	Gochang County	Heungdeok-myeon	National Route 22 overlap
Jeha IS	제하사거리	National Route 22 (Seonun-daero)	Gochang County	Heungdeok-myeon	National Route 22 overlap
Chii IS	치이삼거리	Jaenmal-gil	Gochang County	Heungdeok-myeon	
Singi IS	신기삼거리	Hupo-ro	Gochang County	Heungdeok-myeon	
Sindeok IS	신덕삼거리	Hupo-ro	Gochang County	Heungdeok-myeon	
Sinri IS	신리삼거리	Sinri-ro	Buan County	Julpo-myeon	
Julpo IS	줄포사거리	Prefectural Route 710 (Julpojungang-ro)	Buan County	Julpo-myeon	
No name	(이름 없음)	Prefectural Route 707 (Julpo-gil)	Buan County	Julpo-myeon	
Julpo Middle School	줄포중학교		Buan County	Julpo-myeon	
Julpojung IS	줄포중삼거리	Julpoyongseo-gil	Buan County	Julpo-myeon	
Yeongjeon IS	영전사거리	National Route 30 (Cheongja-ro); Yeongjeon-gil	Buan County	Boan-myeon	
Yeongjeon Elementary School	영전초등학교		Buan County	Boan-myeon	
Yujeong IS	유정삼거리	Jongyu-ro	Buan County	Sangseo-myeon	
Bongeun IS	봉은삼거리	Gaeam-ro	Buan County	Sangseo-myeon	
Monkey Park Udeok Elementary School Sangseo-myeon Office	원숭이학교 우덕초등학교 상서면사무소		Buan County	Sangseo-myeon	
Sangseo IS	상서사거리	Prefectural Route 736 (Goindol-ro); Manseok-ro	Buan County	Sangseo-myeon	
Baekseok Bridge	백석교		Buan County	Sangseo-myeon	
Baekseok Bridge			Buan County	Haengan-myeon	
Sports Park IS	스포츠파크사거리	Sunhwanbung-ro; Sunhwannam-ro	Buan County	Haengan-myeon	
Haeang School IS	행안초교사거리	Maechang-ro; Wollyun-gil	Buan County	Haengan-myeon	
Singi IS	신기 교차로	Orijeong-ro	Buan County	Haengan-myeon	
Songjeong IS	송정 교차로	Prefectural Route 705 (Beonyeong-ro); Byeonsan-ro; Seomun-ro	Buan County	Haengan-myeon	Prefectural Route 705 overlap
Seorim IS	서림 교차로	Hangamae-gil	Buan County	Buan-eup	Prefectural Route 705 overlap
Bonghwang IS	봉황 교차로	National Route 30 (Byeonsanbada-ro)	Buan County	Dongjin-myeon	Prefectural Route 705 overlap
Sinnong IS	신농 교차로	Prefectural Route 705 (Dongjin-ro)	Buan County	Dongjin-myeon	Prefectural Route 705 overlap
Gomaje IS	고마제 교차로	Gomaje-ro	Buan County	Dongjin-myeon	
Dongjin Bridge	동진대교		Buan County	Dongjin-myeon	
Dongjin Bridge			Gimje City	Juksan-myeon	
Soje IS	소제 교차로	Seopo 2-gil	Gimje City	Juksan-myeon	
Eonpo IS	언포 교차로	Juksan-ro	Gimje City	Juksan-myeon	
Juksan Bridge	죽산교		Gimje City	Juksan-myeon	
Obong IS	오봉 교차로	Juksan-ro	Gimje City	Juksan-myeon	
Okseong IS	옥성 교차로	Juksan-ro; Oseong 3-gil	Gimje City	Juksan-myeon	
No name	(이름 없음)	Okseong-ro	Gimje City	Juksan-myeon	
Yeonjeong 1 Bridge	연정1교		Gimje City	Juksan-myeon	
Yeonjeong 1 Bridge			Gimje City	Gyowol-dong	
Yeonjeong IS	연정 교차로		Gimje City	Gyowol-dong	Under construction
Husin 1 IS	후신1 교차로	Juksan-ro; Husin-gil	Gimje City	Gyowol-dong	
Husin IS	후신 교차로	National Route 29 (Byeokseong-ro); Woljuk-ro	Gimje City	Gyowol-dong	National Route 29 overlap
Seoam IS	서암사거리	National Route 29 (Geumman-ro)	Gimje City	Yochon-dong	National Route 29 overlap
Seohung IS (Daehakro Underpass)	서흥 교차로 (대학로지하차도)	Prefectural Route 712 (Nambuk-ro); Byeokseong-ro	Gimje City	Yochon-dong	Prefectural Route 712 overlap
Deokam Middle School Deokam High School Deokam Information High School	덕암중학교 덕암고등학교 덕암정보고등학교		Gimje City	Yochon-dong	Prefectural Route 712 overlap
Heungsa IS	흥사 교차로	Prefectural Route 712 (Baeksan-ro)	Gimje City	Yochon-dong	Prefectural Route 712 overlap
Heungboksa Temple Entrance	흥복사입구	Seungban-gil	Gimje City	Yochon-dong	
Saneopdoro IS	산업도로 교차로	Arirang-ro	Gimje City	Yochon-dong	
Sangjeong IS	상정 교차로	Jongjeong-gil	Gimje City	Baeksan-myeon	
Baeksan IS	백산 교차로	Prefectural Route 702 (Nongje-ro)	Gimje City	Baeksan-myeon	Prefectural Route 702 overlap
Jongeol IS	존걸 교차로	Prefectural Route 702 (Soeumbang-ro); Yugang-ro; Hwanggyeong-gil	Gimje City	Gongdeok-myeon	Prefectural Route 702 overlap
Songsan Overpass	송산육교	Gongdeok 4-gil	Gimje City	Gongdeok-myeon	
Gongdeok IS	공덕 교차로	National Route 21 (Saemangeumbuk-ro)	Gimje City	Gongdeok-myeon	
Mokcheon Bridge	목천대교		Gimje City	Gongdeok-myeon	
Mokcheon Bridge			Iksan City	Osan-myeon	
Mokcheon IS	목천 교차로	National Route 26 (Beonyeong-ro)	Iksan City	Osan-myeon	
Songhak IS	송학 교차로	National Route 27 (Gunik-ro)	Iksan City	Osan-myeon	National Route 27 overlap
(Oegeom)	(외검)	Hangjaeng-ro	Iksan City	Osan-myeon	National Route 27 overlap
Jangsin IS	장신 교차로	Osan-ro	Iksan City	Osan-myeon	National Route 27 overlap
Yeongman Bridge Cheongsu Bridge	영만교 청수교		Iksan City	Osan-myeon	National Route 27 overlap
Yeongman IS	영만 교차로	National Route 27 (Gunik-ro)	Iksan City	Osan-myeon	National Route 27 overlap
(Unnamed bridge)	(교량 명칭 미상)		Iksan City	Osan-myeon	
(Unnamed bridge)	(교량 명칭 미상)		Iksan City	Sin-dong	
(Unnamed bridge)	Hwangdeung-myeon		Iksan City		
(Unnamed bridge)	Hwangdeung-myeon	(교량 명칭 미상)	Iksan City		
Dongryeon IS	Hwangdeung-myeon	동련 교차로	Iksan City	Prefectural Route 722 (Hwangdeungseo-ro)	
Dongryeon IS	Hamna-myeon		Iksan City	Prefectural Route 722 (Hwangdeungseo-ro)	
(Unnamed bridge)	Hamna-myeon	(교량 명칭 미상)	Iksan City		
Jukchon IS	죽촌 교차로	Siwa-ro	Iksan City	Hwangdeung-myeon	
(Unnamed bridge)	(교량 명칭 미상)		Iksan City	Hamyeol-eup	
Dasong IS	다송 교차로	Iksan-daero	Iksan City	Hamyeol-eup	
Dasong IS (Overpass)	다송사거리 (고가)	Prefectural Route 723 (Baekje-ro)	Iksan City	Hamyeol-eup	
Yongwang IS	용왕 교차로	Mireuksaji-ro	Iksan City	Hamyeol-eup	
Jeongdong IS	정동오거리	Prefectural Route 724 (Hamnang-ro); Hamyeol 10-gil	Iksan City	Hamyeol-eup	
Namdang IS	남당사거리	Hamyeoljungang-ro	Iksan City	Hamyeol-eup	
Hamyeol Girls' High School	함열여자고등학교		Iksan City	Hamyeol-eup	
Hamyeol IS	함열 교차로	Wari 5-gil Chilmok-gil	Iksan City	Hamyeol-eup	
Dongjisan-ri	동지산리	Anseong-ro	Iksan City	Yongan-myeon	
An Bridge Songsan Overpass	안대교 송산육교		Iksan City	Yongan-myeon	
Songsan IS	송산 교차로	Hamyeol-ro	Iksan City	Yongan-myeon	
Haknam Bridge	학남교		Iksan City	Yongan-myeon	
Yongan Entrance IS	용안입구 교차로	Prefectural Route 706 (Hyeonnae 1-ro)	Iksan City	Yongan-myeon	
Deokyong IS	덕용 교차로	Prefectural Route 711 (Haman-ro)	Iksan City	Yongan-myeon	
Yongan Bridge	용안교		Iksan City	Yongan-myeon	
Jungsin IS	중신 교차로	Hyeonnae-ro	Iksan City	Yongan-myeon	
Un Bridge	운교		Iksan City	Yongan-myeon	
Un Bridge			Iksan City	Yongdong-myeon	
Gusan-ri	구산리	Yongdong-ro	Iksan City	Yongdong-myeon	
Hwasan IS	화산 교차로	Nabawi-gil; Hwasan 1-gil	Iksan City	Mangseong-myeon	
Hwasan Bridge	화산교		Iksan City	Mangseong-myeon	
Mangseong IS	망성 교차로	Prefectural Route 68 (Ganggyeong-Yeonmugan Road)	Iksan City	Mangseong-myeon	Prefectural Route 68 overlap Continuation into South Chungcheong Province
Mangseongdojeong Factory	망성도정공장		Iksan City	Mangseong-myeon	Prefectural Route 68 overlap Continuation into South Chungcheong Province

=== South Chungcheong Province·Sejong City ===
Name	Hangul name	Connection	Location		Note
Mangseongdojeong Factory	망성도정공장		Nonsan City	Ganggyeong-eup	Prefectural Route 68 overlap
Ganggyeong Middle School	강경중학교		Nonsan City	Ganggyeong-eup	Prefectural Route 68 overlap
Ganggyeong Middle School IS	강경중학교앞 교차로	Prefectural Route 68 (Gyebaek-ro)	Nonsan City	Ganggyeong-eup	Prefectural Route 68 overlap
Chaesan Bridge (level crossing)	채산과선교		Nonsan City	Ganggyeong-eup	
Sanyang IS	산양사거리	Dongan-ro	Nonsan City	Ganggyeong-eup	
Ganggyeong Bridge	강경대교		Nonsan City	Ganggyeong-eup	
Ganggyeong Bridge			Nonsan City	Chaeun-myeon	
Samgeo IS	삼거삼거리	Gyebaek-ro	Nonsan City	Chaeun-myeon	
Chaeun IS	채운삼거리	Chaeun-ro	Nonsan City	Chaeun-myeon	
Hwasan IS	화산사거리	Nonsan-daero; Gyebaek-ro; Gyebaek-ro655beon-gil	Nonsan City	Buchang-dong	
Under Nolmoe Bridge	놀뫼대교밑	Deugan-daero; Gangbyeon-ro	Nonsan City	Buchang-dong	
Nonsansin Bridge (Nolmoe Bridge)	논산신대교 (놀뫼대교)		Nonsan City	Buchang-dong	
Nonsansin Bridge (Nolmoe Bridge)			Nonsan City	Seongdong-myeon	
Nonsan IS	논산 교차로	National Route 4 (Daebaekje-ro)	Nonsan City	Gwangseok-myeon	National Route 4 overlap
Gwangseok IS	광석 교차로	National Route 4 Prefectural Route 643 (Jangmaru-ro)	Nonsan City	Gwangseok-myeon	National Route 4 overlap
Cheondong IS	천동 교차로	Nonsanpyeongya-ro	Nonsan City	Gwangseok-myeon	
Wangjeon IS	왕전 교차로	Nonsanpyeongya-ro; Wangjeon 2-gil	Nonsan City	Gwangseok-myeon	
Hado IS	하도 교차로	Hado 1-gil	Nonsan City	Noseong-myeon	
Noseong IS	노성 교차로	Prefectural Route 691 (Baekilhyeon-ro); Noseong-ro	Nonsan City	Sangwol-myeon	
Sinchung IS	신충 교차로	Baeilhyeon-ro	Nonsan City	Sangwol-myeon	
Wolo IS	월오 교차로	Howol-ro; Wolo 5-gil	Nonsan City	Sangwol-myeon	
Hawolgok 1 Bridge	월곡1교		Nonsan City	Sangwol-myeon	
Hawolgok 1 Bridge			Gongju City	Gyeryong-myeon	
Sangseong IS	상성 교차로	Prefectural Route 697 (Gubunae-ro)	Gongju City	Gyeryong-myeon	
Yupyeong IS	유평 교차로	Yeonggyudaesa-ro; Hoksin-gil	Gongju City	Gyeryong-myeon	
Bongmyeong IS	봉명 교차로		Gongju City	Gyeryong-myeon	
Dolban IS	돌반 교차로	Sohakdong-gil; Singian-gil	Gongju City	Ongnyong-dong	
Singongju Bridge	신공주대교		Gongju City	Ongnyong-dong	
Singongju Bridge			Gongju City	Wolsong-dong	
Wolsong IS	월송 교차로	National Route 32; Prefectural Route 96 (Geumbyeong-ro)	Gongju City	Wolsong-dong	
Daraeul IS	다래울 교차로	Sasongjeong-gil	Gongju City	Wolsong-dong	
Songseon IS (Overpass)	송선 교차로 (고가교)	National Route 36 (Janggi-ro)	Gongju City	Wolsong-dong	National Route 36 overlap
Cheongryong IS	청룡 교차로	Prefectural Route 627 (Uidangjeonui-ro)	Gongju City	Uidang-myeon	National Route 36 overlap
Mokcheon IS	목천 교차로	National Route 36 (Chadong-ro)	Gongju City	Useong-myeon	National Route 36 overlap
Mokcheon IS	목천 교차로	Mokcheon 2-gil Baekjekeun-gil	Gongju City	Useong-myeon	
Oin IS (Overpass)	오인 교차로 (고가교)	Moran-gil; Uidang-gil	Gongju City	Uidang-myeon	
Hajeongan Bridge	하정안교		Gongju City	Jeongan-myeon	
Naechon IS	내촌 교차로	Jeonganjungang-gil	Gongju City	Jeongan-myeon	
Naechon Bridge Gwangjeong Bridge	내촌교 광정교		Gongju City	Jeongan-myeon	
Gwangjeong IS	광정 교차로	Jeonganjungang-gil	Gongju City	Jeongan-myeon	
Jeongan IC (Jeongan IC IS) (Changmal IS)	정안 나들목 (정안IC 교차로) (창말 교차로)	Nonsan–Cheonan Expressway; National Route 43 (Jeongansejong-ro)	Gongju City	Jeongan-myeon	National Route 43 overlap
Charyeong Tunnel	차령터널		Gongju City	Jeongan-myeon	National Route 43 overlap Right tunnel: Approximately 490m Left tunnel: Approximately 445m
Charyeong Tunnel			Cheonan City	Dongnam District Gwangdeok-myeon	National Route 43 overlap Right tunnel: Approximately 490m Left tunnel: Approximately 445m
Wondeok Bridge	원덕교	Charyeonggogae-ro	Cheonan City	Dongnam District Gwangdeok-myeon	National Route 43 overlap
Yucheon IS	유천 교차로	National Route 1 (Sejong-ro)	Sejong City	Jeonui-myeon	National Route 1, National Route 43 overlap
Gujeong IS	구정사거리	Unjusan-ro; Haengjeong-gil	Cheonan City	Dongnam District Gwangdeok-myeon	National Route 1, National Route 43 overlap
Haengjeong IS	행정삼거리	Prefectural Route 623 (Charyeonggogae-ro)	Sejong City	Sojeong-myeon	National Route 1, National Route 43 overlap
Undang-ri IS	운당리삼거리	Sojeonggu-gil	Sejong City	Sojeong-myeon	National Route 1, National Route 43 overlap
Undang IS	운당 교차로	National Route 43 (Sejong-Pyeongtaek Road); Sojeongangol1-gil	Sejong City	Sojeong-myeon	National Route 1, National Route 43 overlap
Gokgyocheon Bridge	곡교천교		Sejong City	Sojeong-myeon	National Route 1 overlap
Gokgyocheon Bridge IS	곡교천교삼거리	Gasong-ro	Sejong City	Sojeong-myeon	National Route 1 overlap
Sojeong Bridge	소정대교		Sejong City	Sojeong-myeon	National Route 1 overlap
Sojeong Overpass	소정육교앞	Gungri-gil; Sojeonggu-gil	Sejong City	Sojeong-myeon	National Route 1 overlap
Daegok IS	대곡사거리	Chwigeumheon-ro	Sejong City	Sojeong-myeon	National Route 1 overlap
Je3sosa Bridge	제3소사교		Cheonan City	Dongnam District Mokcheon-eup	National Route 1 overlap
South Cheonan IC	남천안 나들목	Nonsan-Cheonan Expressway	Cheonan City	Dongnam District Mokcheon-eup	National Route 1 overlap
Doriti IS	도리티삼거리	Cheongdangsaneop-gil	Cheonan City	Dongnam District Mokcheon-eup	National Route 1 overlap
Doriti	도리티		Cheonan City	Dongnam District Mokcheon-eup	National Route 1 overlap
Doriti			Cheonan City	Dongnam District	National Route 1 overlap
Sun Moon University Cheonan Campus	선문대학교 천안캠퍼스		Cheonan City	Dongnam District	National Route 1 overlap
Cheonan Girls' High School IS (Cheonan Life Sports Park)	천안여고삼거리 (천안생활체육공원)	Samnyong 3-gil	Cheonan City	Dongnam District	National Route 1 overlap
Cheongsam IS	청삼 교차로	National Route 21 (Nambu-daero)	Cheonan City	Dongnam District	National Route 1 overlap
Cheonan Museum Cheonan Samgeori Park	천안박물관 천안삼거리공원		Cheonan City	Dongnam District	National Route 1 overlap
Samyong IS	삼룡사거리	Chungjeol-ro	Cheonan City	Dongnam District	National Route 1 overlap
Gulul IS	굴울사거리	Jeonggol 1-gil	Cheonan City	Dongnam District	National Route 1 overlap
Guseong IS	구성삼거리	Chungmu-ro	Cheonan City	Dongnam District	National Route 1 overlap
Cheonan Dongnam Fire Station	천안동남소방서		Cheonan City	Dongnam District	National Route 1 overlap
Gojae IS	고재사거리	Yuryang-ro; Gojae 15-gil	Cheonan City	Dongnam District	National Route 1 overlap
Dorowonjeom IS	도로원점삼거리	Beodeul-ro	Cheonan City	Dongnam District	National Route 1 overlap
Dongbu IS	동부사거리	Taejosan-gil; Wonseongcheon 1-gil	Cheonan City	Dongnam District	National Route 1 overlap
Cheonan-ro IS	천안로사거리	Cheonan-daero; Mannam-ro	Cheonan City	Dongnam District	National Route 1 overlap
Cheonan IC	천안 나들목	Gyeongbu Expressway; National Route 1 (Samseong-daero)	Cheonan City	Dongnam District	Terminus; National Route 1 overlap
Directly connected with Prefectural Route 23
