= Expressway 25 (South Korea) =

Expressway 25 may refer to the following roads in South Korea:

- Honam Expressway : Suncheon, South Jeolla ~ Nonsan, South Chungcheong
- Nonsan–Cheonan Expressway : Nonsan, South Chungcheong ~ Cheonan, South Chungcheong
