= Sejong–Pocheon Expressway =

Road in South Korea

Expressway No.29
- Sejong–Pocheon Expressway 세종포천고속도로

Route information
- Length: 121.7 km (75.6 mi)
- Existed: 30 June 2017–present

Major junctions
- South end: Anseong, Gyeonggi Province
- North end: Pocheon, Gyeonggi Province

Location
- Country: South Korea

Highway system
- Highway systems of South Korea; Expressways; National; Local

- Sejong–Pocheon Expressway
- Hangul: 세종포천고속도로
- Hanja: 世宗抱川高速道路
- RR: Sejong Pocheon gosok doro
- MR: Sejong P'och'ŏn kosok toro

The Sejong–Pocheon Expressway (Korean: 세종포천고속도로) is an expressway in South Korea, connecting Anseong to Guri, Seoul, Namyangju, Uijeongbu and Pocheon.

Construction on the Guri–Pocheon section was started on June 30, 2012, and finished on June 30, 2017. It is a private investment project so the toll rates are cheaper than other expressways in South Korea. The highway operated is by the Seoul Northern Highway Corporation.
The Sejong–Guri section has been called Sejong–Seoul Expressway or 2nd Gyeongbu Expressway, and it is planned to reduce traffic congestion between Gyeongbu Expressway and Jungbu Expressway. The first section of Seongnam–Guri is Anseong–Guri section, was finished on April 25, 2017. The remaining sections between Anseong and Seongnam will be completed in 2022. The second section, Sejong–Anseong, will be started in 2020 and completed in 2025.

Currently the National Route 43, National Route 47 and Dongbu Expressway, which connects Pocheon and Seoul have many vehicles and traffic lights. This expressway has reduced the travel time between two cities from 1 hour 30 minutes to 40 minutes.

== Construction accident ==
On 25 February 2025, an under construction viaduct of the expressway in Anseong collapsed, killing 4 and injuring 6 workers. Investigation by relevant authorities concluded that the contractor and client removed stabilizing devices without review. Once the construction crew then launched the 400-ton beam launcher a few days later, the construction collapsed. The collapsed section also blocked National Route 34 for 10 days.

=== Investigation ===
Anseong expressway collapses
- www.youtube.com/watch?v=qbrCHKY-nwI

Five people were to be arrested, being charged with professional negligence resulting in death and injuries, as well as violations of the Occupational Safety and Health Act. Nine others face charges for professional negligence and violating the Construction Technology Promotion Act.

== Main stopovers ==
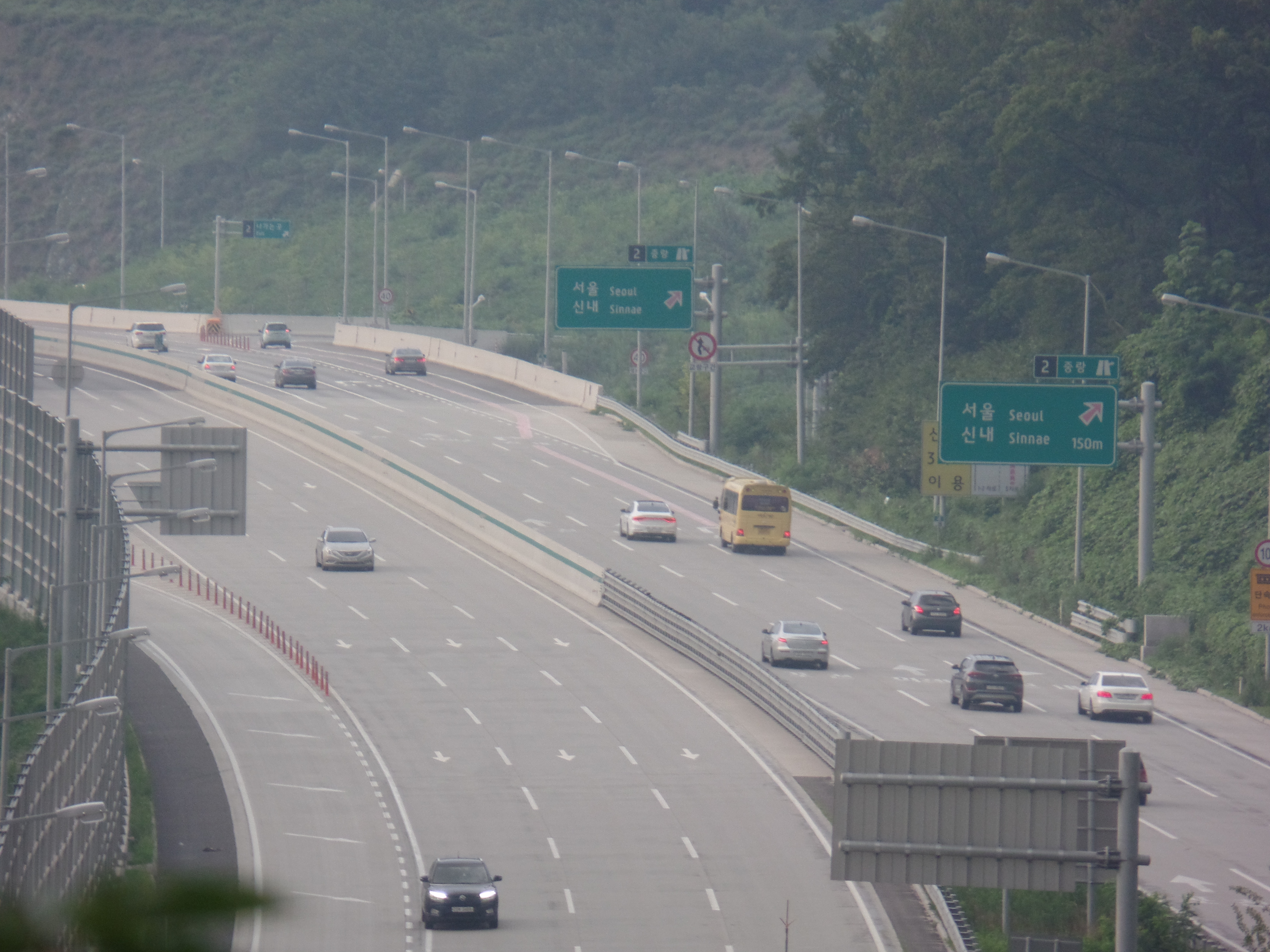
Jungnang Interchange.

Gyeonggi Province

- Anseong - Yongin - Gwangju - Seongnam - Hanam

Seoul

- Gangdong District

Gyeonggi Province

- Guri

Seoul

- Jungnang District

Gyeonggi Province

- Guri - Namyangju - Uijeongbu - Pocheon

== Compositions ==
=== Lanes ===
- S. Anseong JCT - Soheul JCT: 6 (102.66 km)
- Soheul JCT - Sinbuk IC: 4 (14.14 km)

=== Tunnel ===
Tunnel name	Hangul	Location	Length	Opened	Notes
Guri Tunnel	구리터널	Gyeonggi Guri Topyeong-dong	3,483.5m	2017	Pocheon-bound
Guri Tunnel		Gyeonggi Guri Topyeong-dong	3,605m	2017	Guri-bound
Jungnang IC Underpass	중랑IC 1지하차도	Seoul Jungnang District Sinnae-dong	140m	2017	
Jungnang IC 2 Underpass	중랑IC 2지하차도	Seoul Jungnang District Sinnae-dong	3.3m	2017	
Galmae Underpass	갈매지하차도	Seoul Jungnang District Sinnae-dong	100m	2017	
Namyangju Tunnel	남양주터널	Gyeonggi Namyangju Byeollae-myeon	1,235m	2017	Pocheon-bound
Namyangju Tunnel		Gyeonggi Namyangju Byeollae-myeon	1,255m	2017	Guri-bound
Jageum Underpass	자금지하차도	Gyeonggi Uijeongbu Geumo-dong	180m	2017	
Chukseokryeong Tunnel	축석령터널	Gyeonggi Uijeongbu Geumo-dong	495m	2017	
Igapal Underpass	이가팔지하차도	Gyeonggi Pocheon Soheul-eup	360m	2017	

== List of facilities ==
- IC: Interchange, JCT: Junction, SA: Service Area, TG:Tollgate

=== Anseong ~ Pocheon ===
No.	Name	Korean name	Hanja name	Connections	Distance		Notes	Location	
Sejong-Anseong section will open to traffic (December 2026)
11	S. Anseong JCT	남안성분기점	南安城分岐點	Pyeongtaek–Jecheon Expressway	-	55.86		Gyeonggi	Anseong
12	Anseong Matchum	안성맞춤		National Route 38 (Seodong-daero)				Gyeonggi	Anseong
13 SA	Gosam; Gosam Lake SA	고삼 고삼호수휴게소	古三 古三湖水休憩所	Ijeonbongsan-gil				Gyeonggi	Anseong
14	S. Yongin IC			Local Road 318 (Iwon-ro)				Gyeonggi	Anseong
15	Yongin JCT	용인분기점	龍仁分岐點	Yeongdong Expressway				Gyeonggi	Yongin
16	N. Yongin JCT	북용인분기점	北龍仁分岐點	Capital Region Second Ring Expressway				Gyeonggi	Yongin
17	N. Yongin	북용인	北龍仁	Local Route 57				Gyeonggi	Yongin
SA	Cheoin SA	처인휴게소	處仁休憩所					Gyeonggi	Yongin
18	Opo	오포	五浦	National Route 43 (Poeun-daero)				Gyeonggi	Gwangju
19	Gwangnam	광남	廣南	National Route 3 (Seongnamicheon-ro)		106.60		Gyeonggi	Gwangju
20	W. Hanam JCT	서하남분기점	西河南分岐點	Capital Region First Ring Expressway		121.00		Gyeonggi	Hanam
TG	Hanam Gambuk TG	하남감북요금소	河南甘北料金所				Main-line Tollgate	Gyeonggi	Hanam
21	Choi	초이	草二	Gamcho-ro		122.60		Gyeonggi	Hanam
22	Gangdong Godeok	강동고덕	江東高德	Olympic Expressway; Dongnam-ro	4.90	126.90		Seoul	Gangdong
23 1	S. Guri	남구리	南九里	Gangbyeon Expressway	1.70	128.60; 0.00		Gyeonggi	Guri
2	Jungnang	중랑	中浪	Bukbu Expressway	5.30	5.30	Tollgate	Seoul	Jungnang
TG	Galmae-Donggureung TG	갈매동구릉요금소	葛梅東九陵料金所				Main-line Tollgate	Gyeonggi	Guri
3	S. Byeollae	남별내	南別內	Songsan-ro; Deoknae-ro; National Route 43 (Jeondochi-ro)	7.30	12.60		Gyeonggi	Namyangju
SA	Byeollae SA	별내휴게소	別內休憩所				Pocheon-bound	Gyeonggi	Namyangju
4	E. Uijeongbu	동의정부	東議政府	National Route 43 (Songsan-ro)	6.60	19.20		Gyeonggi	Uijeongbu
SA	Uijeongbu SA	의정부휴게소	議政府休憩所				Sejong-bound	Gyeonggi	Uijeongbu
5	Millak	민락	民樂	Millak-ro 298beon-gil National Route 3 (Sinpyeonghwa-ro); Millak-ro	3.25	22.45		Gyeonggi	Uijeongbu
6	Soheul	소흘	蘇屹	National Route 43 (Hoguk-ro); Local Route 98 (Hoguk-ro)	5.85	28.30		Gyeonggi	Pocheon
7	Soheul JCT	소흘분기점	蘇屹分岐點	Capital Region Second Ring Expressway	2.16	30.46		Gyeonggi	Pocheon
8	Seondan	선단	仙壇	National Route 43 (Hoguk-ro); Local Route 56 (Hoguk-ro); Local Route 364 (Samyuksa-ro)	4.54	35.00		Gyeonggi	Pocheon
9	Pocheon	포천	抱川	National Route 87 (Pocheon-ro)	5.95	40.95		Gyeonggi	Pocheon
TG	Sinbuk TG	신북요금소	新北料金所				Main-line Tollgate	Gyeonggi	Pocheon
10	Sinbuk	신북	新北	National Route 43 (Hoguk-ro); Banwolsanseong-ro	3.65	44.60		Gyeonggi	Pocheon

=== Soheul ~ Yangju section ===
This section is officially opened as the branch line of Sejong–Pocheon Expressway. However, it is guided to the Capital Region 2nd Ring Expressway.

No.	Name	Hangul	Connection	Location		Notes
1	Soheul JCT	소흘 분기점	Sejong–Pocheon Expressway (Main)	Gyeonggi Province	Pocheon	
2	Okjeong	옥정	Prefectural Route 56 (Hwahap-ro)	Gyeonggi Province	Yangju	Yangju-bound Only
3	Yangju	양주	Prefectural Route 56 (Hwahap-ro); National Route 3 (Sinpyeonghwa-ro)	Gyeonggi Province	Yangju	

== See also ==
- Roads and expressways in South Korea
- Transportation in South Korea
