= Yeongi-myeon =

Township of Sejong City, South Korea

- Hangul: 연기면
- Hanja: 燕岐面
- RR: Yeongi-myeon
- MR: Yŏn'gi-myŏn

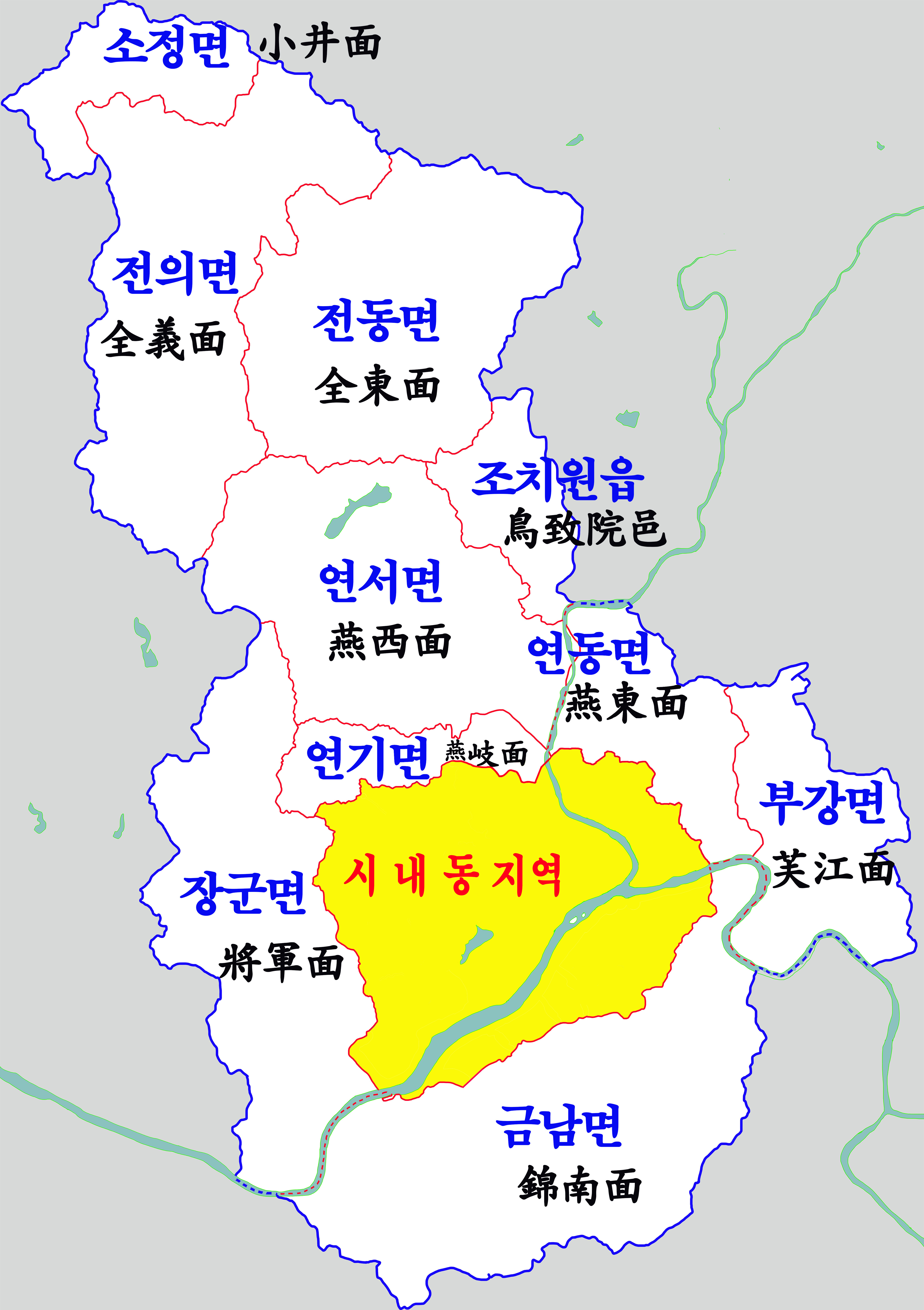
Map of Sejong City

Yeongi-myeon (Korean: 연기면) is a township of Sejong City, South Korea.
