= Janggun-myeon =

Township of Sejong City, South Korea

- Hangul: 장군면
- Hanja: 將軍面
- RR: Janggun-myeon
- MR: Changgun-myŏn

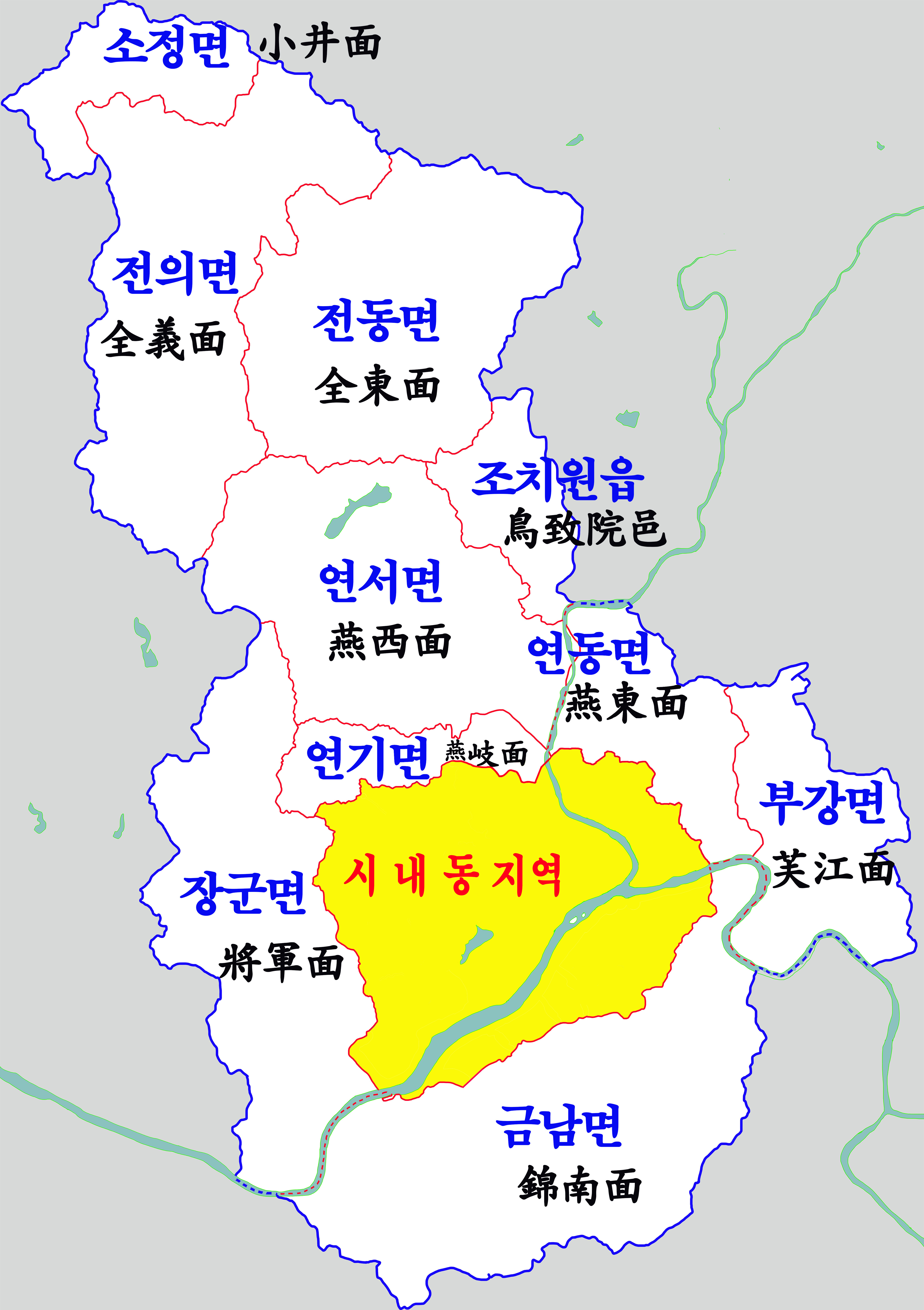
Map of Sejong City

Janggun-myeon (Korean: 장군면) is a township of Sejong City, South Korea.
