= Areum-dong =

Neighborhood of Sejong City, South Korea

- Hangul: 아름동
- Hanja: 아름洞
- RR: Areum-dong
- MR: Arŭm-dong

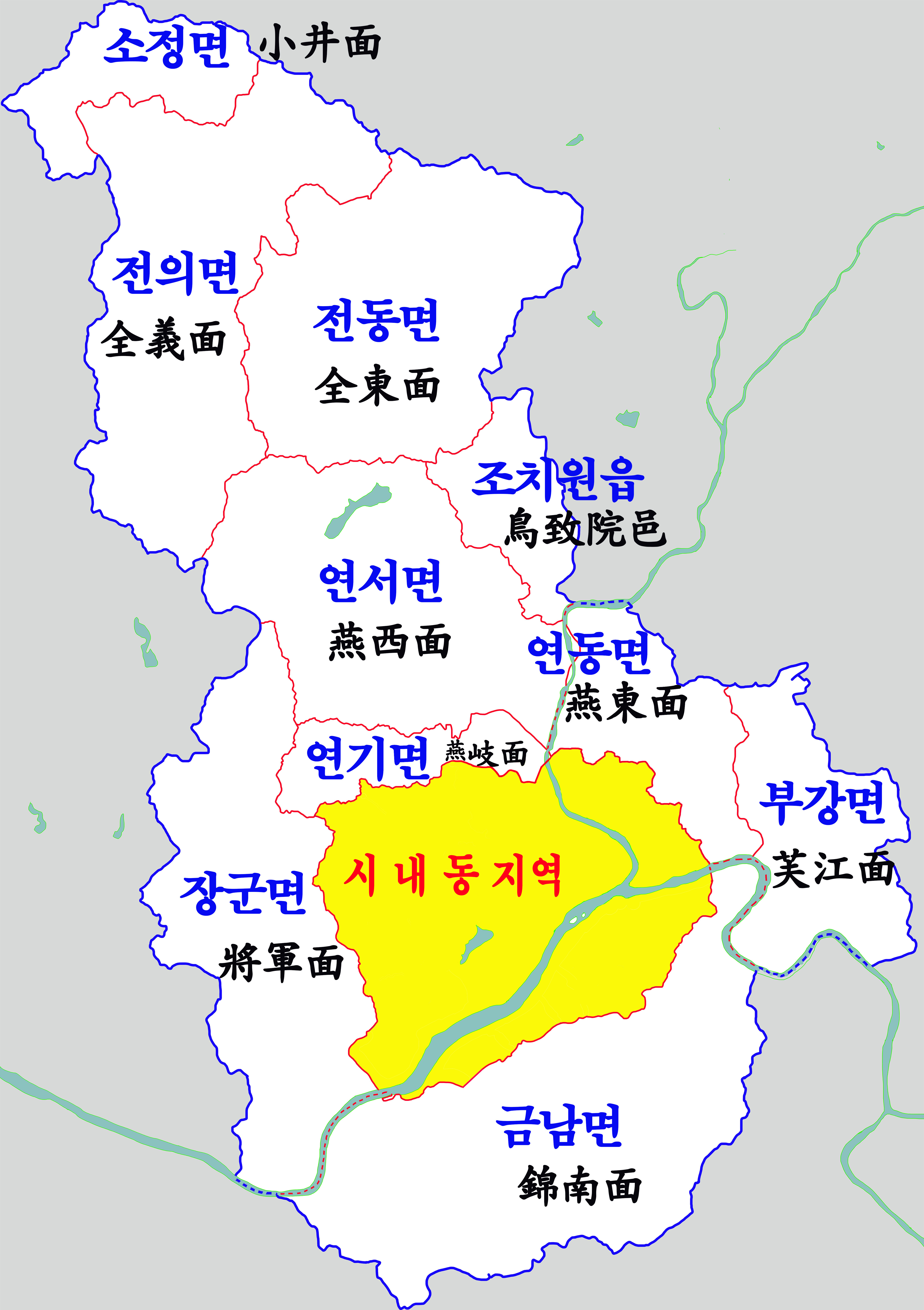
Map of Sejong City

Areum-dong (Korean: 아름동) is a neighborhood of Sejong City, South Korea.
