= Nonsan–Cheonan Expressway =

Expressway in South Korea

Expressway No.25
- Nonsan-Cheonan Expressway

Location
- Country: South Korea

Highway system
- Highway systems of South Korea; Expressways; National; Local

- Nonsan–Cheonan Expressway
- Hangul: 논산천안고속도로
- Hanja: 論山天安高速道路
- RR: Nonsan Cheonan gosok doro
- MR: Nonsan Ch'ŏnan kosok toro

The Nonsan–Cheonan Expressway (Korean: 논산천안고속도로) is an expressway serving the South Chungcheong region in South Korea. It connects Nonsan on the Gyeongbu Expressway to Cheonan on the Honam Expressway. The freeway's route number is 25, which it shares with the Honam Expressway.

== List of facilities ==
- IC: Interchange, JC: Junction, SA: Service Area, TG:Tollgate

No.	Name	Korean name	Distance		Connection	Location		Note
Interchange numbered before 28 belongs to Honam Expressway
29	Nonsan JC	논산 분기점	-	0.00	Honam Expressway; Honam Expressway Branch	South Chungcheong Province	Nonsan	
30	Yeonmu IC	연무 나들목	8.37	8.37	Local Route 68 (Dongan-ro)	South Chungcheong Province	Nonsan	
31	W.Nonsan IC	서논산 나들목	8.69	17.06	National Route 4 (Daebaekje-ro); National Route 23 (Deugan-daero)	South Chungcheong Province	Nonsan	
32	Tancheon IC	탄천 나들목	8.49	25.55	Local Route 643 (Jangmaru-ro); Local Route 645 (Jangmaru-ro·Manmareum-gil)	South Chungcheong Province	Gongju	
SA	Tancheon SA	탄천휴게소				South Chungcheong Province	Gongju	Nonsan-bound Only
SA	Iin SA	이인휴게소				South Chungcheong Province	Gongju	Cheonan-bound Only
33	S.Gongju IC	남공주 나들목	14.49	40.04	National Route 40 (Baekjemunhwa-ro); Local Route 96 (Baekjemunhwa-ro)	South Chungcheong Province	Gongju	
34	Gongju JC	공주 분기점	7.00	47.04	Dangjin-Yeongdeok Expressway (Seocheon-Gongju Expressway)	South Chungcheong Province	Gongju	
34-1	N.Gongju JC	북공주 분기점	1.88	48.92	Dangjin-Yeongdeok Expressway	South Chungcheong Province	Gongju	Nonsan-bound Only
SA	Jeongan Albam SA	정안알밤휴게소				South Chungcheong Province	Gongju	
35	Jeongan IC	정안 나들목	14.30	63.22	National Route 23 (Charyeong-ro); National Route 43 (Jeongansejong-ro·Charyeong-ro)	South Chungcheong Province	Gongju	
35-1	S.Pungse IC	남풍세 나들목	12.27	75.49	National Route 1 (Sejong-ro); National Route 23 (Sejong-ro); National Route 43 (Sejong-Pyeongtaek Motorway)	South Chungcheong Province	Cheonan	
36	S.Cheonan IC	남천안 나들목	4.11	79.60	National Route 1 (Sejong-ro·Cheonan-daero); National Route 23 (Sejong-ro·Cheonan-daero)	South Chungcheong Province	Cheonan	
37	Cheonan JC	천안 분기점	2.44	82.04	Gyeongbu Expressway	South Chungcheong Province	Cheonan	

== See also ==
- Roads and expressways in South Korea
- Transportation in South Korea
