= Sojeong-myeon =

Township of Sejong City, South Korea

- Hangul: 소정면
- Hanja: 小井面
- RR: Sojeong-myeon
- MR: Sojŏng-myŏn

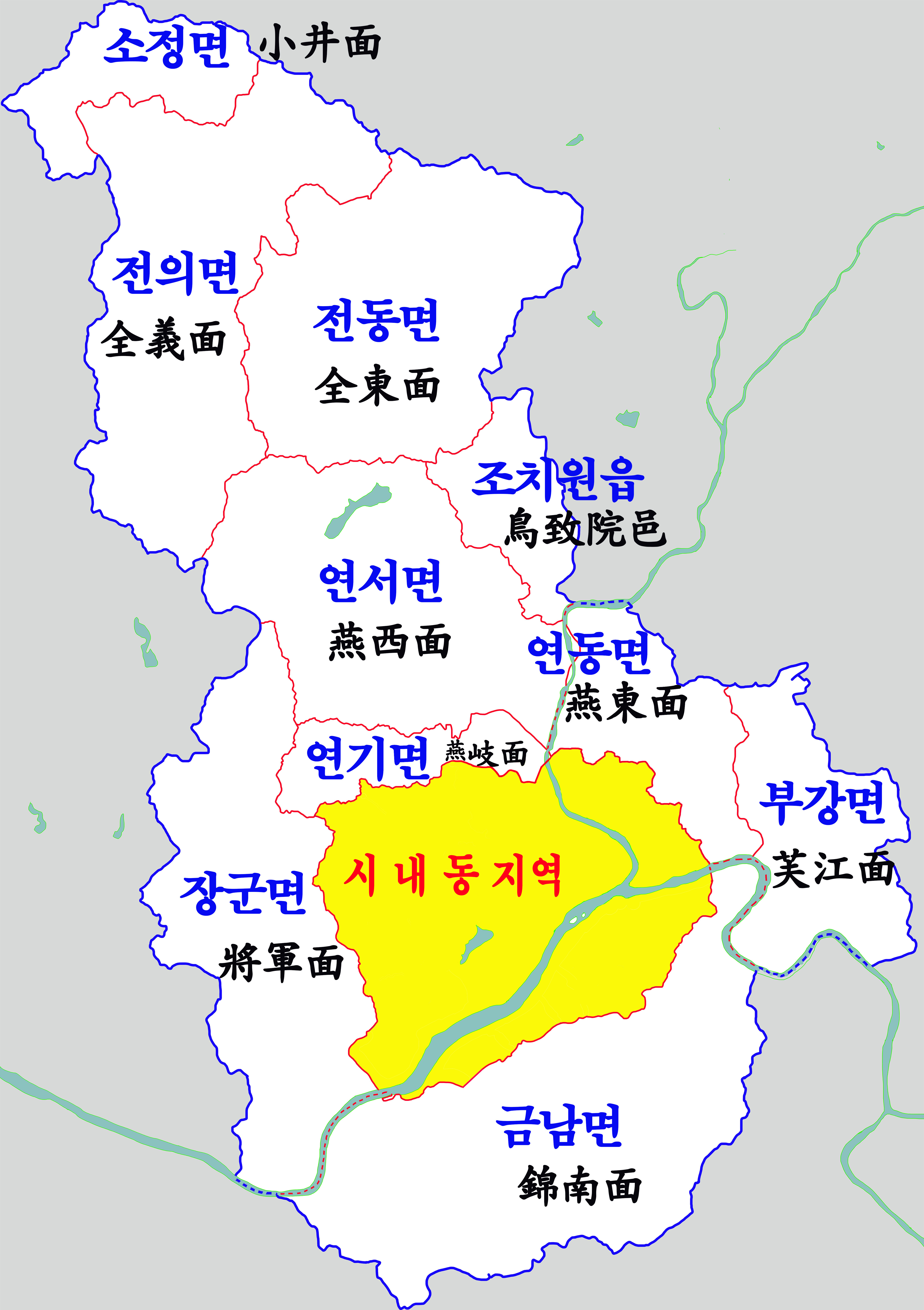
Map of Sejong City

Sojeong-myeon (Korean: 소정면) is a township of Sejong City, South Korea.
