= Jeonui-myeon =

Township of Sejong City, South Korea

Coordinates: 36.6778°N 127.2042°E

- Hangul: 전의면
- Hanja: 全義面
- RR: Jeonui-myeon
- MR: Chŏnŭi-myŏn

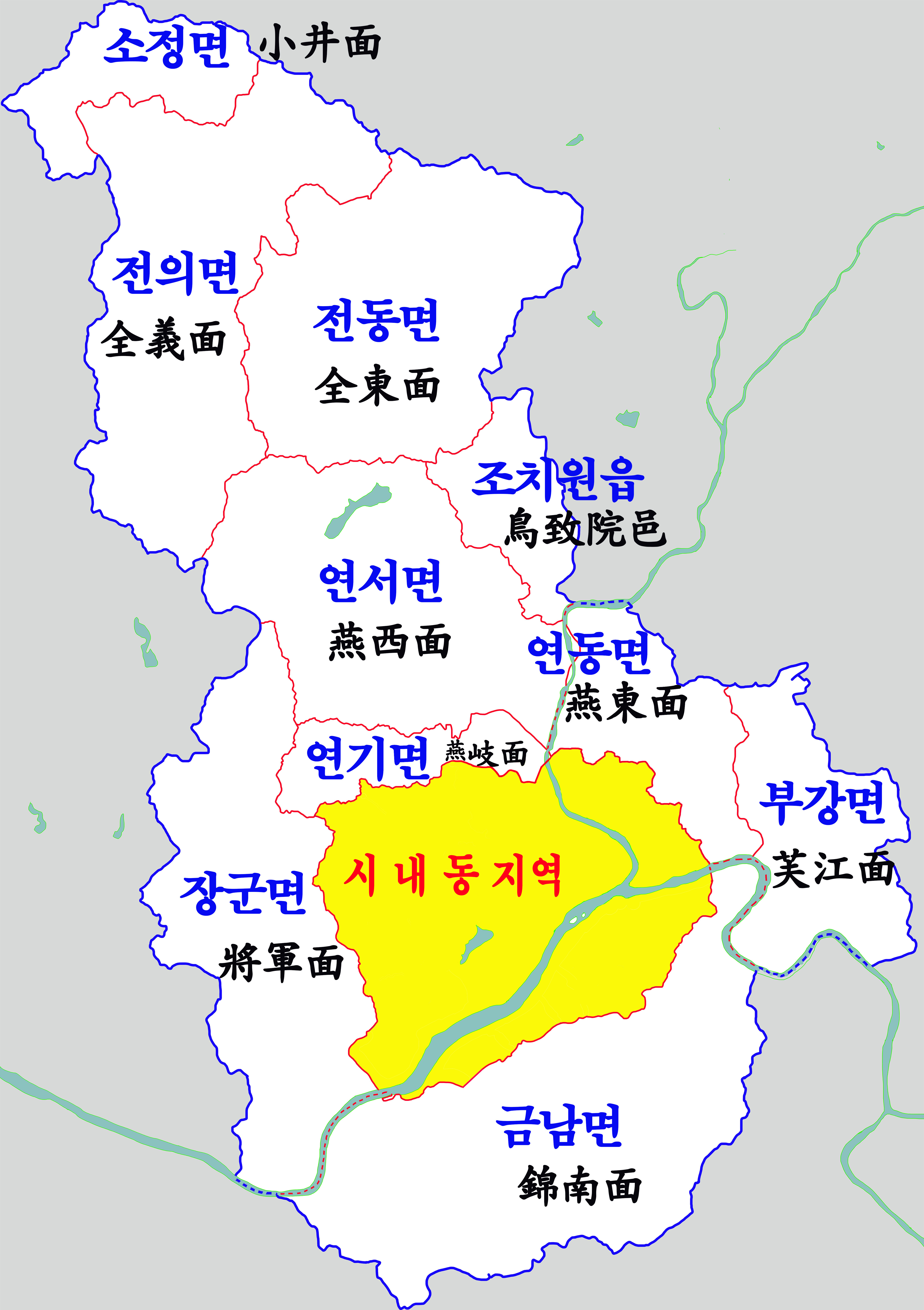
Map of Sejong City

Jeonui-myeon (Korean: 전의면) is a township of Sejong City, South Korea.
