= Dongnam District =

Coordinates: 36.806991°N 127.150335°E

- Non-autonomous District
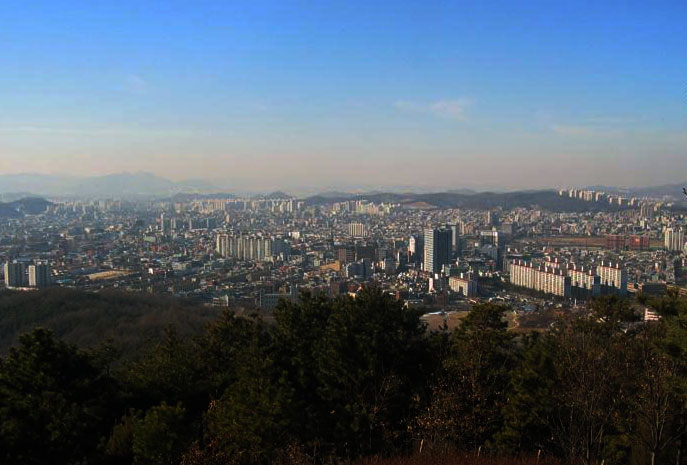

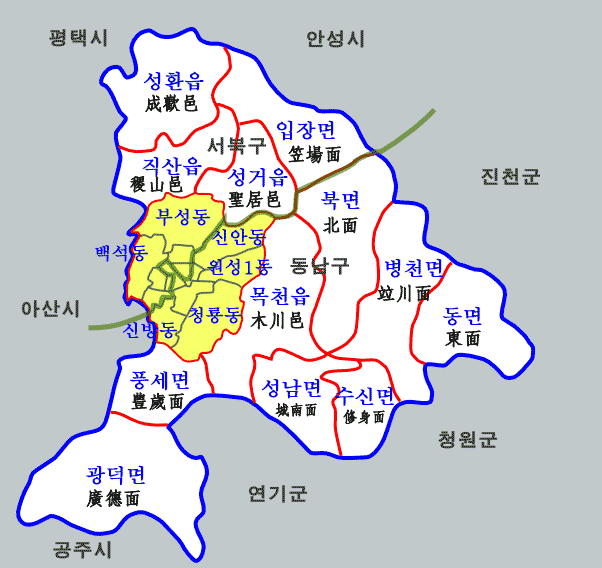
- Dongnam District is located in the southeastern part of Cheonan.
- Country: South Korea
- Region: Hoseo
- Province: South Chungcheong
- City: Cheonan
- Administrative divisions: 9 dong, 1 eup, 7 myeon

Area
  - Total: 438.54 km^{2} (169.32 sq mi)

Population (2012)
  - Total: 264,088
  - Density: 602/km^{2} (1,560/sq mi)
  - Dialect: Chungcheong
- Website: Dongnam District Office

Korean name
- Hangul: 동남구
- Hanja: 東南區
- RR: Dongnam-gu
- MR: Tongnam-gu

Dongnam District (Korean: 동남구) is a non-autonomous district, Cheonan in South Chungcheong Province, South Korea.

== Administrative divisions ==
Dongnam District is divided into one town (eup), 7 townships (myeon), and 9 neighborhoods (dong).

	Hangul	Hanja
Mokcheon-eup	목천읍	木川邑
Pungse-myeon	풍세면	豊歲面
Gwangdeok-myeon	광덕면	廣德面
Buk-myeon	북면	北面
Seongnam-myeon	성남면	城南面
Susin-myeon	수신면	修身面
Byeongcheon-myeon	병천면	竝川面
Dong-myeon	동면	東面
Jungang-dong	중앙동	中央洞
Munseong-dong	문성동	文城洞
Wonseong-dong	원성1동	院城洞
Wonseong-dong	원성2동	院城洞
Bongmyeong-dong	봉명동	鳳鳴洞
Ilbong-dong	일봉동	日峰洞
Sinbang-dong	신방동	新芳洞
Cheongnyong-dong	청룡동	淸龍洞
Sinan-dong	신안동	新安洞

== See also ==
- Seobuk District
