= Hwang Kyo-ahn =

South Korean politician and prosecutor (born 1957)

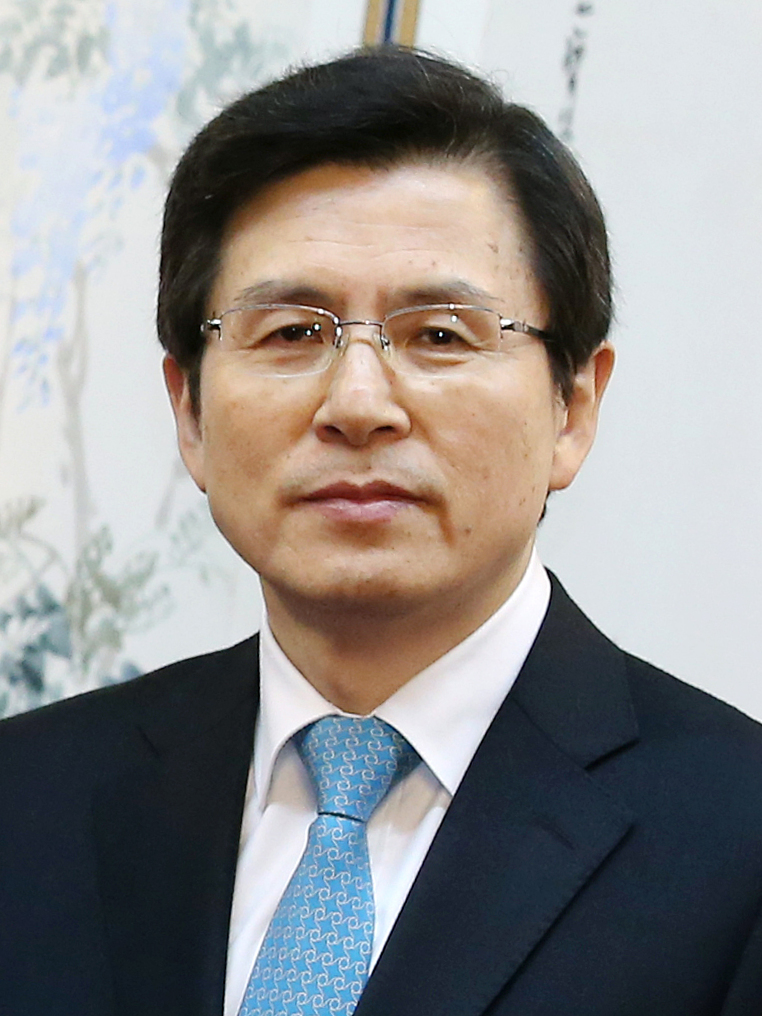
- Hwang in 2016

Acting President of South Korea
- In office 9 December 2016 – 10 May 2017 (Note: Served on behalf of President Park Geun-hye, whose powers and duties were suspended during her term, until March 10, 2017.)
- Prime Minister: Himself
- Preceded by: Park Geun-hye
- Succeeded by: Moon Jae-in

44th Prime Minister of South Korea
- In office 18 June 2015 – 11 May 2017
- President: Park Geun-hye; Himself (acting); Moon Jae-in
- Deputy: Choi Kyoung-hwan; Yoo Il-ho
- Preceded by: Lee Wan-koo; Choi Kyoung-hwan (acting)
- Succeeded by: Yoo Il-ho (acting); Lee Nak-yon

Leader of Liberty Korea Party
- In office 27 February 2019 – 17 February 2020
- Preceded by: Hong Joon-pyo; Kim Sung-tae (acting); Kim Byong-joon (Interim)
- Succeeded by: Position abolished

Leader of United Future Party
- In office 17 February 2020 – 15 April 2020
- Preceded by: Position established
- Succeeded by: Shim Jae-chul (acting); Joo Ho-young (acting); Kim Chong-in (Interim); Lee Jun-seok

Minister of Justice
- In office 11 March 2013 – 18 June 18, 2015
- Prime Minister: Chung Hong-won; Lee Wan-koo; Choi Kyoung-hwan (acting)
- Preceded by: Gwon Jae-jin
- Succeeded by: Kim Ju-hyeon (acting); Kim Hyun-woong

Personal details
- Born: 15 April 1957 (age 69) Seoul, South Korea
- Party: Freedom & Innovation Party
- Other political affiliations: Liberty Korea (2019–2020); United Future (2020); People Power (2020–2025)
- Spouse: Choi Ji-young
- Children: 2
- Education: Sungkyunkwan University (LLB, LLM)

Korean name
- Hangul: 황교안
- Hanja: 黃敎安
- RR: Hwang Gyoan
- MR: Hwang Kyoan
- IPA: [hwaŋ.ɡjo.an]

Hwang Kyo-ahn (Korean: 황교안; born 15 April 1957) is a South Korean politician and prosecutor who served as the acting president of South Korea from 2016 to 2017 and as the prime minister of South Korea from 2015 to 2017.

Hwang served as minister of justice from 2013 to 2015 under President Park Geun Hye. He played a leading role in the investigation into the 2013 South Korean sabotage plot, which led to the conviction of Lee Seok-ki and the dissolution of the Unified Progressive Party. In May 2015, he was nominated by President Park Geun-hye for the position of Prime Minister of South Korea and assumed office on 18 June 2015.

On 9 December 2016, President Park Geun Hye was impeached by the National Assembly. Hwang assumed the role of Acting President of Korea in accordance with the presidential order of succession until the election of Moon Jae-in on 9 May 2017.

In January 2019, he joined the Liberty Korea Party and was elected as its party leader on 27 February 2019. When the Liberty Korea Party merged with several other parties to form the United Future Party on 17 February 2020, Hwang continued his role as party leader of the United Future Party. After leading the United Future Party to a landslide defeat in the 2020 South Korean legislative election and losing his own election for the constituency in Jongno District, Seoul, Hwang resigned as party leader.

On 10 March 2021, Hwang announced his candidacy for nominee of the People Power Party (PPP) in the 2022 South Korean presidential election. He was eliminated from the shortlist of PPP candidates on 8 October. On 9 April 2025, he announced his candidacy for an independent bid for the 2025 South Korean presidential election, having also left the PPP on the same day. He withdrew on 1 June, endorsing PPP nominee Kim Moon-soo.

== Early life and education ==
Hwang was born on 15 April 1957. He graduated from Kyunggi High School in 1976. He received his LL.B in 1981 from the College of Law at Sungkyunkwan University, and passed the 23rd National Bar Exam the same year. In 1983, he studied theology at the Capital Baptist Theological Seminary and obtained a diploma.

Hwang earned his LL.M. in 2006 from the Graduate School of Law at Sungkyunkwan University.

== Prosecutorial career ==
Hwang was a career prosecutor. In December 1982, he began his career as prosecutor at the Chuncheon District Prosecutor's Office. He worked as a public security inspector with the Supreme Public Prosecutors' Office and the Seoul District Public Prosecutor's Office. He spent 30 years as a prosecutor, specializing in enforcing public safety and national security laws under the military junta of Chun Doo-hwan, gaining particular notoriety for targeting democracy activists by linking them with North Korea.

Hwang wrote a book on the national security law called the "Public Security Investigation Textbook."

After serving as the Chief Inspector of the Busan High Prosecutors' Office in 2011, he served as an attorney at the Pacific Law Firm from September 2011 to January 2013.

== Political career before the premiership ==
=== Justice Minister (2013–2015) ===
Hwang joined the Cabinet of South Korean President Park Geun-hye in 2013 as minister of justice. In that role, Hwang played a key role in the Constitutional Court case against the left-wing Unified Progressive Party (which was accused of holding pro-North Korean views); the case culminated in a controversial December 2014 order banning the party, a decision that some saw as a blow to freedom of speech in South Korea.

== Premiership (2015–2017) ==
On 21 May 2015, Park named Hwang as Prime Minister of South Korea, following the resignation of Lee Wan-koo due to allegations of bribery.

In July 2016, Hwang was heckled and pelted with eggs and water bottles by crowds in the rural town of Seongju, who were opposed to deployment of the Terminal High Altitude Area Defense (a U.S. missile defense system) in the area. The deployment plans angered local residents, who raised health and environmental concerns.

Hwang "was regarded as the staunchest loyalist in Park's cabinet." Nevertheless, on 2 November 2016, one month before her impeachment, Park fired Hwang as Prime Minister amid the 2016 South Korean political scandal as Park tried to rebuild confidence in her administration. However, after "a dispute with opposition leaders over choosing a replacement," Hwang was kept in office as prime minister.

Afterwards, Hwang attended the APEC meeting, which was held in Peru, on behalf of Park.

== Acting presidency (2016–2017) ==
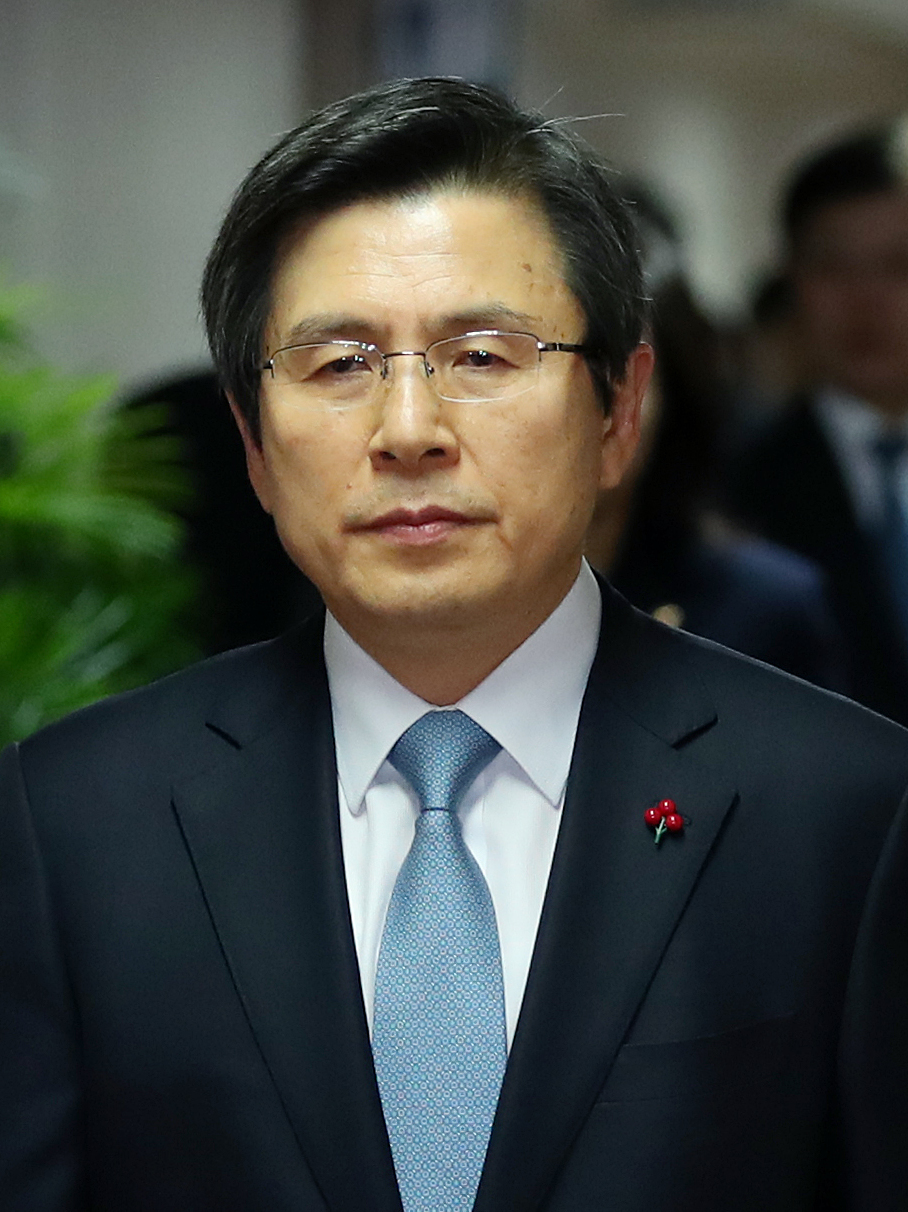
- Acting presidency of Hwang Kyo-ahn; 9 December 2016 – 10 May 2017
- Prime Minister: Himself
- Cabinet: Full list
- Party: Independent
- Seat: Seoul

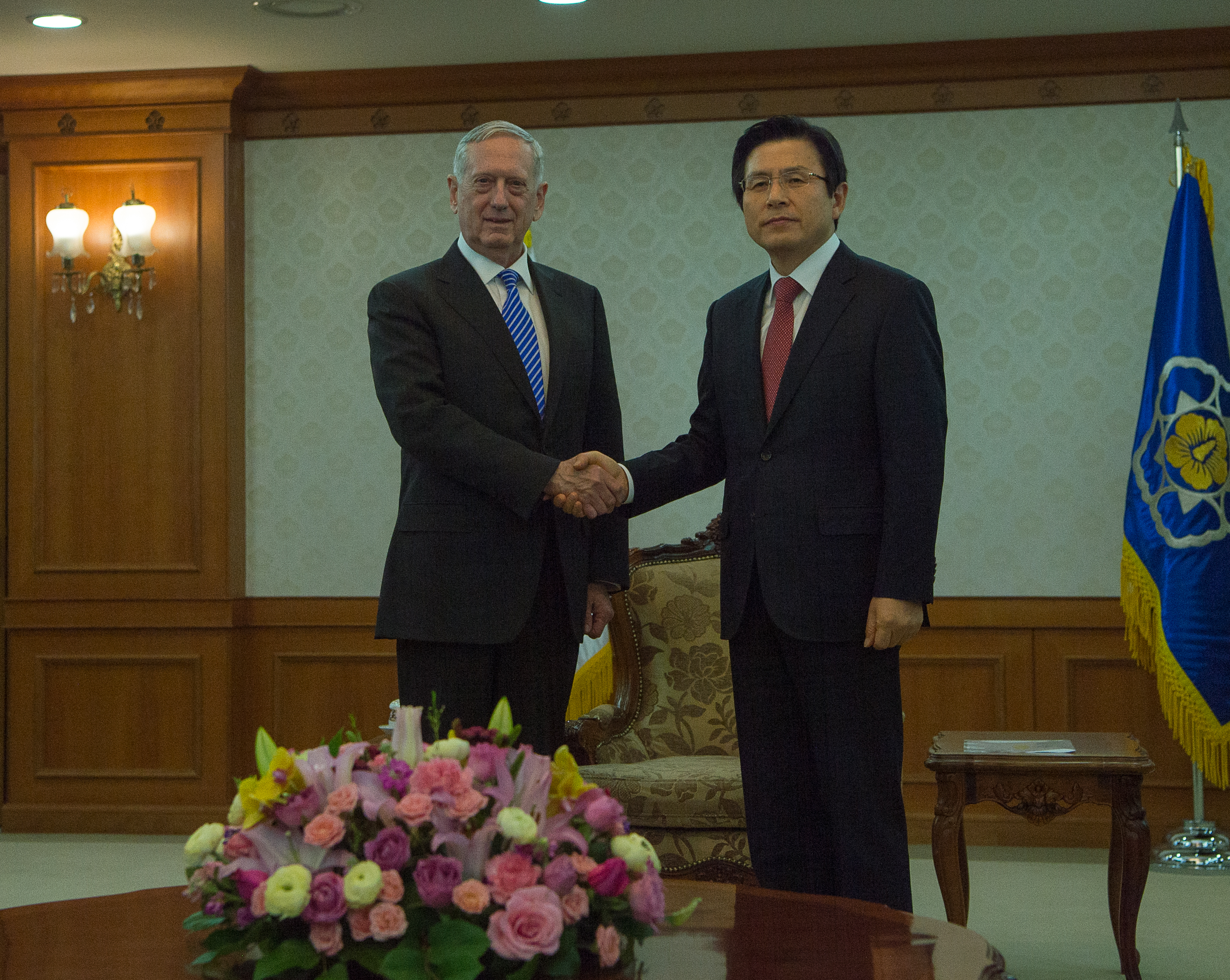
Hwang meeting with U.S. Secretary of Defense James Mattis in February 2017

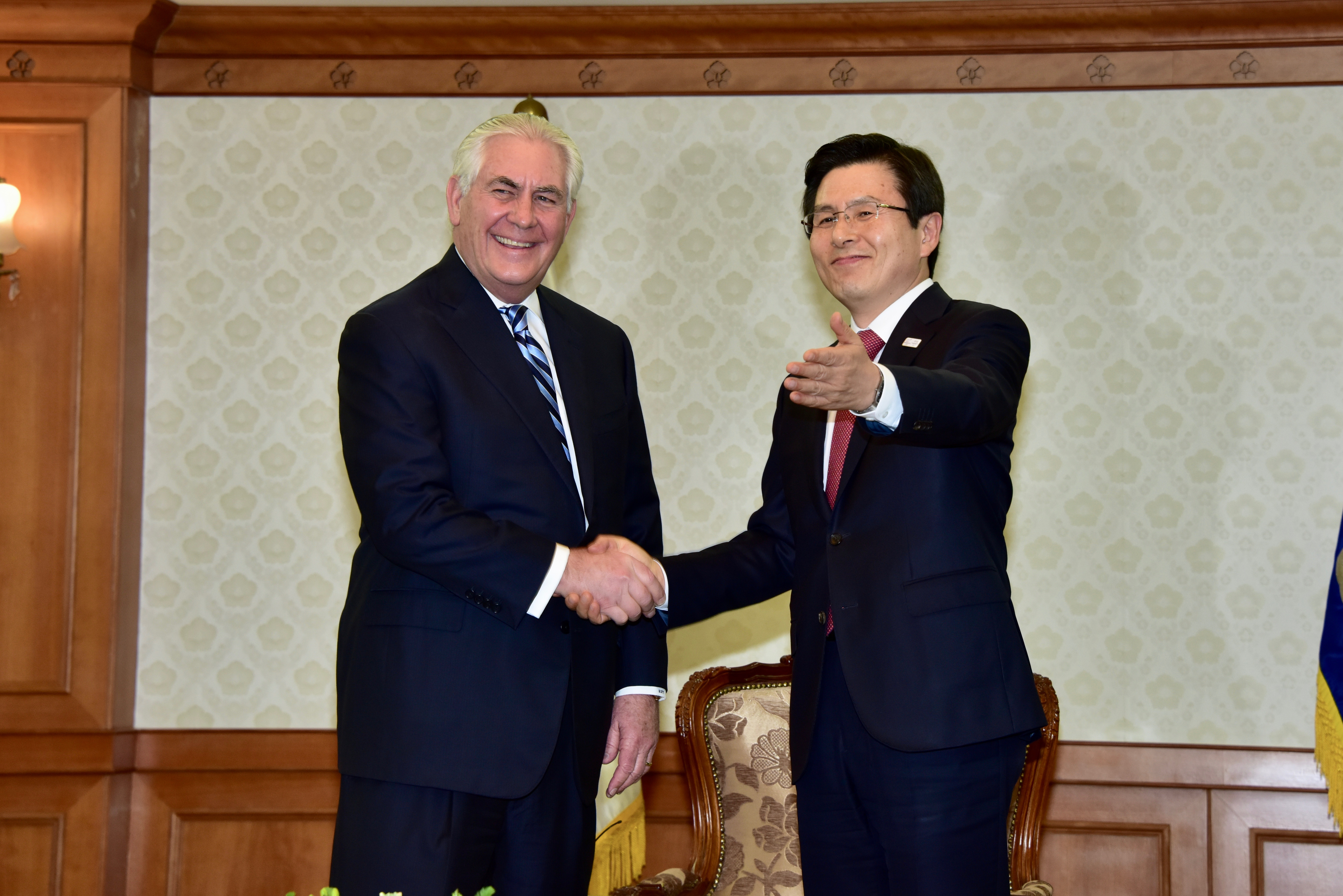
Hwang meeting with U.S. Secretary of State Rex Tillerson on March 17, 2017

On 9 December 2016, upon the National Assembly's vote to impeach President Park following the 2016 South Korean political scandal, Hwang assumed Park's presidential powers and duties as Acting President. On 10 March 2017, South Korea's Constitutional Court upheld the decision to impeach President Park Geun-hye and removed her from office. As a result, Hwang continued as Acting President of South Korea until new elections in early May, which were brought forward from December due to the constitution requiring new elections within 60 days of a permanent presidential vacancy. On assuming the powers of the presidency, Hwang said he felt "deep responsibility". The exact extent of Hwang's powers as acting president are unclear under South Korean law.

His first field tour as acting president was to the Joint Chiefs of Staff in central Seoul, where he emphasized national security and stated "We are facing a grave security status, as we cannot entirely rule out the possibility of North Korean provocations near the Northern Limit Line (NLL)."

Hwang decided against contesting the 2017 presidential election, declaring it would be inappropriate to run, opting instead to focus on his position as Acting President. He was previously seen as the leading candidate for conservatives within the country, leaving them searching for a viable candidate other than Hwang to challenge leading contender Moon Jae-in for the presidency.

He resigned as Prime Minister on 11 May 2017, after the election of his successor as president.

== Post-presidency and party leadership (2018–2020) ==
In November 2018, Hwang joined the Liberty Korea Party. He announced in January 2019 that he would be seeking the party's leadership position. On 27 February 2019, he won Liberty Korea Party leadership election with 50.1 percent of the vote. When the Liberty Korea Party merged with several other smaller parties to form the United Future Party on 17 February 2020, Hwang assumed the role of party leader of the United Future Party.

In the 2020 legislative elections on 15 April, Hwang ran for the seat for the Jongno district of Seoul, which includes the Blue House and Gwanghwamun Plaza. Hwang led his party to a landslide defeat and lost his own Jongno election to Democratic Party candidate and former Prime Minister Lee Nak-yon. Hwang resigned from the leadership on 15 April, shortly after the election. After the 2020 legislative elections, Hwang went on a brief hiatus from politics.

=== 2022 presidential election bid (2021) ===
On 10 March 2021, Hwang Kyo-ahn announced his candidacy in the 2022 South Korean presidential election in a Facebook post. He registered as a candidate for the People Power Party, the current incarnation of the former United Future Party. On 8 October, Hwang was eliminated from the PPP shortlist of nominees as it narrowed to four candidates, effectively ending his 2022 presidential bid. After his loss, Hwang engaged in conspiracy theory and accused the primaries of being fraudulent and rigged.

=== Later career ===
On 5 February 2025, Hwang joined the legal team of impeached president Yoon Suk Yeol defending him from criminal charges relating to his declaration of martial law in December 2024. Hwang had previously expressed support for the declaration.

== Ministry ==
He is a Baptist Christian evangelist of a Baptist Church in Seoul, affiliated with the Korea Baptist Convention.

== Election results ==
| Year | Elections | Constituency | Political party | Votes (%) | Results |
|---|---|---|---|---|---|
| 2020 | 21st National Assembly General Election | Jongno (Seoul) | UFP | 37,594 (39.97%) | Defeated (2nd) |
| 2025 | 2025 Presidential Election | South Korea | Independent | – | Resigned |
| 2026 | 2026 By-elections | Pyeongtaek B (Gyeonggi) | Freedom & Innovation Party | 5,966 (6.19%) | Defeated (4th) |

== Notes ==
Political offices
| Preceded by Gwon Jae-jin | Minister of Justice; 11 March 2013–18 June 2015 | Succeeded by Kim Ju-hyeon (Acting); Kim Hyun-woong |
| Preceded by Lee Wan-koo; Choi Kyoung-hwan (Acting) | Prime Minister of South Korea; 18 June 2015–11 May 2017 | Succeeded by Yoo Il-ho (Acting); Lee Nak-yon |
| Preceded by Park Geun-hye | President of South Korea (Acting); 9 December 2016–10 May 2017; Acting for Park Geun-hye: 2016–2017 | Succeeded by Moon Jae-in |
Party political offices
| Preceded by Hong Joon-pyo; Kim Sung-tae (Acting); Kim Byong-joon (Interim) | Leader of the Liberty Korea Party; 27 February 2019–17 February 2020 | Succeeded by Office abolished |
| Preceded by New Office | Leader of the United Future Party; 17 February 2020–15 April 2020 | Succeeded by Shim Jae-chul (Acting); Joo Ho-young (Acting); Kim Chong-in (Interim); Lee Jun-seok (Leader of the People Power Party) |
