= List of counties of South Korea =

- Map of South Korean counties in teal

Korean name
- Hangul: 군
- Hanja: 郡
- RR: gun
- MR: kun

The counties of South Korea are a second-level administrative division.

There have been 82 counties in South Korea since Cheongwon County was dissolved on July 1, 2014 and consolidated by Cheongju.

County	Hangul	Hanja	Province	Population (2010)	Area (km^{2})
Gijang County	기장군	機張郡	Busan (Metropolitan city)	103,784	217.9
Dalseong County	달성군	達城郡	Daegu (Metropolitan city)	160,363	427.03
Gunwi County	군위군	軍威郡	Daegu (Metropolitan city)	19,993	614.15
Ganghwa County	강화군	江華郡	Incheon (Metropolitan city)	30,643	411.4
Ongjin County	옹진군	甕津郡	Incheon (Metropolitan city)	11,202	172.48 (Note: Divided county, its North Korean counterpart is Ongjin County, South Hwanghae)
Ulju County	울주군	蔚州郡	Ulsan (Metropolitan city)	202,292	754.94
Gapyeong County	가평군	加平郡	Gyeonggi	59,916	843.26
Yangpyeong County	양평군	楊平郡	Gyeonggi	96,950	877.76
Yeoncheon County	연천군	漣川郡	Gyeonggi	45,973	675.22
Cheorwon County	철원군	鐵原郡	Gangwon	43,271	899.82 (Note: Divided county, its North Korean counterpart is Chorwon County)
Goseong County	고성군	高城郡	Gangwon	26,753	664.34 (Note: Divided county, its North Korean counterpart is Kosong County)
Hoengseong County	횡성군	橫城郡	Gangwon	37,798	997.82
Hongcheon County	홍천군	洪川郡	Gangwon	62,888	1,820.14
Hwacheon County	화천군	華川郡	Gangwon	22,119	908.93
Inje County	인제군	麟蹄郡	Gangwon	28,765	1,646.08
Jeongseon County	정선군	旌善郡	Gangwon	35,980	1,220.67
Pyeongchang County	평창군	平昌郡	Gangwon	37,522	1,463.83
Yanggu County	양구군	楊口郡	Gangwon	19,363	701.53
Yangyang County	양양군	襄陽郡	Gangwon	25,475	629.32
Yeongwol County	영월군	寧越郡	Gangwon	35,050	1,127.45
Boeun County	보은군	報恩郡	North Chungcheong	30,509	584.26
Danyang County	단양군	丹陽郡	North Chungcheong	28,165	780.16
Eumseong County	음성군	陰城郡	North Chungcheong	84,088	520.12
Goesan County	괴산군	槐山郡	North Chungcheong	31,392	842
Jincheon County	진천군	鎭川郡	North Chungcheong	61,915	407.38
Okcheon County	옥천군	沃川郡	North Chungcheong	49,730	537.13
Jeungpyeong County	증평군	曾坪郡	North Chungcheong	31,531	81.84
Yeongdong County	영동군	永同郡	North Chungcheong	46,231	846.02
Buyeo County	부여군	扶餘郡	South Chungcheong	67,584	624.65
Cheongyang County	청양군	青陽郡	South Chungcheong	29,755	479.57
Geumsan County	금산군	錦山郡	South Chungcheong	52,952	575.98
Hongseong County	홍성군	洪城郡	South Chungcheong	82,811	443.5
Seocheon County	서천군	舒川郡	South Chungcheong	53,914	363.40
Taean County	태안군	泰安郡	South Chungcheong	53,888	504.82
Yesan County	예산군	禮山郡	South Chungcheong	77,830	542.65
Buan County	부안군	扶安郡	North Jeolla	50,814	493.35
Gochang County	고창군	高敞郡	North Jeolla	53,333	606.90
Imsil County	임실군	任實郡	North Jeolla	23,663	596.88
Jangsu County	장수군	長水郡	North Jeolla	19,424	533.64
Jinan County	진안군	鎭安郡	North Jeolla	20,446	788.94
Muju County	무주군	茂朱郡	North Jeolla	21,827	631.8
Sunchang County	순창군	淳昌郡	North Jeolla	25,241	495.75
Wanju County	완주군	完州郡	North Jeolla	83,408	820.94
Boseong County	보성군	寶城郡	South Jeolla	40,166	663.16
Damyang County	담양군	潭陽郡	South Jeolla	41,027	455.09
Gangjin County	강진군	康津郡	South Jeolla	34,204	495.98
Goheung County	고흥군	高興郡	South Jeolla	63,392	775.5
Gokseong County	곡성군	谷城郡	South Jeolla	27,272	547.37
Gurye County	구례군	求禮郡	South Jeolla	22,419	443.02
Haenam County	해남군	海南郡	South Jeolla	66,042	1,013.8
Hampyeong County	함평군	咸平郡	South Jeolla	30,995	392.77
Hwasun County	화순군	和順郡	South Jeolla	62,219	786.23
Jangheung County	장흥군	長興郡	South Jeolla	35,763	617.96
Jangseong County	장성군	長城郡	South Jeolla	38,507	518.65
Jindo County	진도군	珍島郡	South Jeolla	28,565	420.32
Muan County	무안군	務安郡	South Jeolla	68,462	436.4
Sinan County	신안군	新安郡	South Jeolla	33,222	655.68
Wando County	완도군	莞島郡	South Jeolla	46,777	391.81
Yeongam County	영암군	靈巖郡	South Jeolla	58,748	544.48
Yeonggwang County	영광군	靈光郡	South Jeolla	48,663	472.97
Bonghwa County	봉화군	奉化郡	North Gyeongsang	31,242	1,201
Cheongdo County	청도군	淸道郡	North Gyeongsang	38,228	696.53
Cheongsong County	청송군	靑松郡	North Gyeongsang	24,008	842.45
Chilgok County	칠곡군	漆谷郡	North Gyeongsang	114,246	451
Goryeong County	고령군	高靈郡	North Gyeongsang	31,817	383.7
Seongju County	성주군	星州郡	North Gyeongsang	36,859	616.28
Uiseong County	의성군	義城郡	North Gyeongsang	51,247	1,175.89
Uljin County	울진군	蔚珍郡	North Gyeongsang	47,108	989.06
Ulleung County	울릉군	鬱陵郡	North Gyeongsang	7,764	72.518
Yecheon County	예천군	醴泉郡	North Gyeongsang	43,015	660.7
Yeongdeok County	영덕군	盈德郡	North Gyeongsang	36,428	741.05
Yeongyang County	영양군	英陽郡	North Gyeongsang	16,540	815.14
Changnyeong County	창녕군	昌寧郡	South Gyeongsang	55,189	533.09
Geochang County	거창군	居昌郡	South Gyeongsang	57,323	804.09
Goseong County	고성군	固城郡	South Gyeongsang	51,703	660.71
Hadong County	하동군	河東郡	South Gyeongsang	41,862	675.53
Haman County	함안군	咸安郡	South Gyeongsang	60,794	417
Hapcheon County	합천군	陜川郡	South Gyeongsang	43,639	983.42
Hamyang County	함양군	咸陽郡	South Gyeongsang	38,002	725.03
Namhae County	남해군	南海郡	South Gyeongsang	60,794	357
Sancheong County	산청군	山淸郡	South Gyeongsang	31,898	794.59
Uiryeong County	의령군	宜寧郡	South Gyeongsang	25,602	482.95

== Dissolved counties ==
County	Hangul	Hanja	Province	Dissolved Date	Present Location
Goyang County	고양군	高陽郡	Gyeonggi	1992.2.1	Promoted to Goyang city.
Gwangju County	광주군	廣州郡	Gyeonggi	2001.3.21	Promoted to Gwangju city.
Yangju County	양주군	楊州郡	Gyeonggi	2003.10.19	Promoted to Yangju city.
Pocheon County	포천군	抱川郡	Gyeonggi	2003.10.19	Promoted to Pocheon city.
Yeoju County	여주군	驪州郡	Gyeonggi	2013.9.23	Promoted to Yeoju city.
Icheon County	이천군	利川郡	Gyeonggi	1996.3.1	Promoted to Icheon city.
Yongin County	용인군	龍仁郡	Gyeonggi	1996.3.1	Promoted to Yongin city.
Anseong County	안성군	安城郡	Gyeonggi	1998.4.1	Promoted to Anseong city.
Pyeongtaek County	평택군	平澤郡	Gyeonggi	1995.5.10	Consolidated with Sungtan City and old Pyeongtaek City, promoted to Pyeongtaek city.
Suwon County	수원군	水原郡	Gyeonggi	1949.8.15	Downtown of the county promoted to Suwon city, remaining part of the county renamed to Hwaseong County.
Hwaseong County	화성군	華城郡	Gyeonggi	2001.3.21	Promoted to Hwaseong city.
Siheung County	시흥군	始興郡	Gyeonggi	1989.1.1	Promoted to Siheung, Gunpo and Uiwang city.
Bucheon County	부천군	富川郡	Gyeonggi	1973.7.1	Administrative divisions were annexed by Bucheon City, Gimpo County, Siheung County and Ongjin County respectively.
Gimpo County	김포군	金浦郡	Gyeonggi	1998.4.1	Promoted to Gimpo city.
Paju County	파주군	坡州郡	Gyeonggi	1996.3.1	Promoted to Paju city.
Jangdan County	장단군	長湍郡	Gyeonggi	1972.12.28	Administrative divisions were annexed by Paju County.
Chuncheon County	춘천군	春川郡	Gangwon	1995.1.1	Consolidated with old Chuncheon City, promoted to Chuncheon city.
Myeongju County	명주군	溟州郡	Gangwon	1995.1.1	Consolidated with old Gangneung City, promoted to Gangneung city.
Samcheok County	삼척군	三陟郡	Gangwon	1995.1.1	Consolidated with old Samcheok City, promoted to Samcheok city.
Wonju County	원주군	原州郡	Gangwon	1995.1.1	Consolidated with old Wonju City, promoted to Wonju city.
Cheongwon County	청원군	淸原郡	North Chungcheong	2014.7.1	Consolidated with old Cheongju City, promoted to Cheongju city.
Jungwon County	중원군	中原郡	North Chungcheong	1995.1.1	Consolidated with old Chungju City, promoted to Chungju city.
Jecheon County	제천군	堤川郡	North Chungcheong	1995.1.1	Consolidated with old Jecheon City, promoted to Jecheon city.
Daedeok County	대덕군	大德郡	South Chungcheong	1988.12.31	Administrative divisions were annexed by Daejeon City (Daedeok District) and Nonsan County.
Yeongi County	연기군	燕岐郡	South Chungcheong	2012.7.1	Dissolved, became administrative divisions under the newly established Sejong City.
Gongju County	공주군	公州郡	South Chungcheong	1995.1.1	Consolidated with old Gongju City, promoted to Gongju city.
Nonsan County	논산군	論山郡	South Chungcheong	1996.3.1	Promoted to Nonsan city.
Boryeong County	보령군	保寧郡	South Chungcheong	1995.1.1	Consolidated with Daecheon City, promoted to Boryeong city.
Seosan County	서산군	瑞山郡	South Chungcheong	1995.1.1	Consolidated with old Seosan City, promoted to Seosan city.
Dangjin County	당진군	唐津郡	South Chungcheong	2012.1.1	Promoted to Dangjin city.
Asan County	아산군	牙山郡	South Chungcheong	1995.1.1	Consolidated with Onyang City, promoted to Asan city.
Cheonan County	천안군	天安郡	South Chungcheong	1995.5.10	Consolidated with old Cheonan City, promoted to Cheonan city.
Namwon County	남원군	南原郡	North Jeolla	1995.1.1	Consolidated with old Namwon City, promoted to Namwon city.
Jeongeup County	정읍군	井邑郡	North Jeolla	1995.1.1	Consolidated with Jeongju City, promoted to Jeongeup city.
Gimje County	김제군	金堤郡	North Jeolla	1995.1.1	Consolidated with old Gimje City, promoted to Gimje city.
Okgu County	옥구군	沃溝郡	North Jeolla	1995.1.1	Consolidated with old Gunsan City, promoted to Gunsan city.
Iksan County	익산군	益山郡	North Jeolla	1995.5.10	Consolidated with Iri City, promoted to Iksan city.
Gwangsan County	광산군	光山郡	South Jeolla	1988.1.1	Consolidated with Gwangju City, became Gwangsan District under Gwangju.
Gwangyang County	광양군	光陽郡	South Jeolla	1995.1.1	Consolidated with Donggwangyang City, promoted to Gwangyang city.
Yeosu County	여수군	麗水郡	South Jeolla	1998.4.1	Consolidation of Yeosu County, Yeocheon County and old Yeosu City, promoted to Yeosu city.
Yeocheon County	여천군	麗川郡	South Jeolla	1998.4.1	Consolidation of Yeosu County, Yeocheon County and old Yeosu City, promoted to Yeosu city.
Seungju County	승주군	昇州郡	South Jeolla	1995.1.1	Consolidated with old Suncheon City, promoted to Suncheon city.
Naju County	나주군	羅州郡	South Jeolla	1995.1.1	Consolidated with old Naju City, promoted to Naju city.
Andong County	안동군	安東郡	North Gyeongsang	1995.1.1	Consolidated with old Andong City, promoted to Andong city.
Yeongil County	영일군	迎日郡	North Gyeongsang	1995.1.1	Consolidated with old Pohang City, promoted to Pohang city.
Gyeongju County	경주군	慶州郡	North Gyeongsang	1995.1.1	Consolidated with old Gyeongju City, promoted to Gyeongju city.
Yeongcheon County	영천군	永川郡	North Gyeongsang	1995.1.1	Consolidated with old Yeongcheon City, promoted to Yeongcheon city.
Gyeongsan County	경산군	慶山郡	North Gyeongsang	1995.1.1	Consolidated with old Gyeongsan City, promoted to Gyeongsan city.
Geumneung County	금릉군	金陵郡	North Gyeongsang	1995.1.1	Consolidated with old Gimcheon City, promoted to Gimcheon city.
Seonsan County	선산군	善山郡	North Gyeongsang	1995.1.1	Consolidated with old Gumi City, promoted to Gumi city.
Sangju County	상주군	尚州郡	North Gyeongsang	1995.1.1	Consolidated with old Sangju City, promoted to Sangju city.
Mungyeong County	문경군	聞慶郡	North Gyeongsang	1995.1.1	Consolidated with Jeomchon City, promoted to Mungyeong city.
Yeongpoong County	영풍군	榮豊郡	North Gyeongsang	1995.1.1	Consolidated with old Yeongju City, promoted to Yeongju city.
Jinyang County	진양군	晋陽郡	South Gyeongsang	1995.1.1	Consolidated with old Jinju City, promoted to Jinju city.
Miryang County	밀양군	密陽郡	South Gyeongsang	1995.1.1	Consolidated with old Miryang City, promoted to Miryang city.
Yangsan County	양산군	梁山郡	South Gyeongsang	1996.3.1	Promoted to Yangsan city.
Gimhae County	김해군	金海郡	South Gyeongsang	1995.5.10	Consolidated with old Gimhae City, promoted to Gimhae city.
Changwon County	창원군	昌原郡	South Gyeongsang	1995.1.1	Administrative divisions were annexed by Changwon and Masan City.
Tongyeong County	통영군	統營郡	South Gyeongsang	1995.1.1	Consolidated with Chungmu City, promoted to Tongyeong city.
Sacheon County	사천군	泗川郡	South Gyeongsang	1995.5.10	Consolidated with Samcheonpo City, promoted to Sacheon city.
Bukjeju County	북제주군	北済州郡	Jeju	2006.7.1	Consolidated into Jeju City.
Namjeju County	남제주군	南濟州郡	Jeju	2006.7.1	Consolidated into Seogwipo City.

1946

- Cheongju County
- Chuncheon County
- Yeongpyeong County

1949

- Yeosu County

1952

- Gangneung County
- Gyeongju County
- Wonju County

1956

- Chungju County

1963

- Cheongan County

1973

- Bucheong County
- Dongrae County

1980

- Jecheong County

1988

- Gwangsan County

1989

- Chunseong County
- Daedeok County
- Siheung County
- Wolseong County
- Wonseong County

1992

- Goyang County

1995

- Asan County
- Boryeong County
- Changwon County
- Cheonan County
- Chuncheon County
- Geoje County
- Geumreung County
- Gimhae County
- Gimje County
- Gongju County
- Gwangyang County
- Gyeongju County
- Gyeongsan County
- Iksan County
- Jecheon County
- Jeongeup County
- Jinyang County annexed by Jinju
- Jungwon County annexed by Chungju
- Miryang County
- Mungyeong County
- Myeongju County annexed by Gangneung
- Naju County
- Namwon County
- Namyangju County
- Okgu County annexed by Gunsan
- Pyeongtaek County
- Sacheon County
- Samcheok County
- Sangju County
- Seonsan County annexed by Gumi
- Seosan County
- Seungju County annexed by Suncheon
- Tongyeong County
- Uichang County
- Wonju County
- Yeongcheon County
- Yeongil County annexed by Pohang
- Yeongpung County annexed by Yeongju

1996

- Icheon County
- Nonsan County
- Paju County
- Yangsan County
- Yongin County

1998

- Anseong County
- Gimpo County
- Yeocheon County annexed by Yeosu

2001

- Gwangju County
- Hwaseong County

2003

- Pocheon County
- Yangju County

2006

- Bukjeju County annexed by Jeju
- Namjeju County annexed by Seogwipo

2011

- Dangjin County

2012

- Yeongi County annexed by Sejong

2013

- Yeoju County promoted into a city

2014

- Cheongwon County annexed by Cheongju

== See also ==
- List of cities in South Korea
