= Capital Baptist Theological Seminary =

- Active: 1976–2006
- Affiliations: Korea Baptist Convention
- President: Han-ho Doh
- Location: Seoul and Anseong City, Gyeonggi, South Korea

- Capital Baptist Theological Seminary
- Hangul: 수도침례신학교
- Hanja: 首都浸禮神學校
- RR: Sudo chimnye sinhakgyo
- MR: Sudo ch'imnye sinhakkyo

Capital Baptist Theological Seminary was a Christian school with campuses in Seoul and Anseong City, Gyeonggi province, South Korea. In 2006 it was closed and its campus was used as Korea Baptist Theological University and Seminary's secondary campus as part of Korea Baptist Convention's decision to run only one educational institution.

== Academic departments ==
The undergraduate offerings of the seminary consist of the Department of Theology and the Pastoral Theology institute, both of which offer four-year Bachelor of Theology degrees. The graduate school offers Master's of Divinity and Doctor of Ministry degrees.

In addition, the school offers separate courses of study for women. Two-year certificate programs are offered by the Women's College and Women's Institute, and a three-year Master's of Partnership Ministry is offered by the Pastor's Wives Institute.

== History ==
The school began as Seoul Baptist Theological Seminary, directly operated by the Korea Baptist Convention, in 1976. In 1980, the Convention chose to separate it from other institutions such as Korea Baptist Theological University and make it an independent institution, which was completed in early 1981. At this time the school was merged with two pre-existing institutions, Grace Seminary and Kyunggi Seminary, and the name was changed to the current one. The school was recognized as a theological seminary by the Ministry of Education in 1982.

== Sister schools ==
The school maintains international sisterhood ties with Israel's Jerusalem University College.

== See also ==
- List of colleges and universities in South Korea
- Education in South Korea
