= Kang Chang-il =

South Korean politician (born 1952)

- 강창일
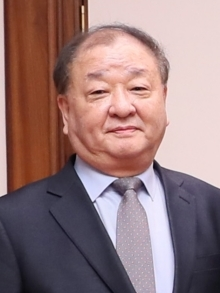

Vice Chairman of the Peaceful Unification Advisory Council
- Incumbent
- Assumed office 16 April 2026
- President: Lee Jae Myung
- Preceded by: Lee Hae-chan

Member of the National Assembly
- In office 30 May 2004 – 29 May 2020
- Constituency: Jeju–Bukjeju A (2004–2008); Jeju A (2008–2020)

Personal details
- Born: 28 January 1952 (age 74) Bukjeju County, Jeju Province, South Korea
- Party: Democratic
- Education: Seoul National University; University of Tokyo
- Website: www.kangci.net

Korean name
- Hangul: 강창일
- Hanja: 姜昌一
- RR: Gang Changil
- MR: Kang Ch'angil

Kang Chang-il (Korean: 강창일; born 28 January 1952) is a South Korean politician who is member of the National Assembly since 2004. Kang served as South Korea's ambassador to Japan from January 2021 to 2022.

== Early life and career ==
Kang Chang-il was born on 28 January 1952 in Bukjeju County (now Jeju City), Jeju Province. He graduated from Seoul National University. Kang lived in Japan while he received a PhD degree from the University of Tokyo.

== Political career ==
Kang was nominated by the Uri Party in the 2004 legislative election and was elected in Jeju City and Bukjeju County, Jeju Province. After that, he was elected successively in the 2008, 2012 and 2016 elections.

On 15 June 2017, he was elected president of the Japan–Korea Parliamentarians' Union.

On 23 November 2020, President Moon Jae-in appointed Kang Chang-il as the new ambassador to Japan. Press Secretary of Japanese MOFA, Tomoyuki Yoshida, revealed on 3 February 2021 that the South Korean side announcement of the appointment was without agrément, and promptly after the announcement, Chief of protocol Atsushi Kaifu had told to embassy of South Korea in Tokyo that it was extremely regrettable to have deviated customary international law. At the time of 3 February 2021, as Kang had not yet completed procedures to become an ambassador, including Letter of credence, he was still called as "the next ambassador to Japan."

An official of the South Korean presidential office said that the appointment of Kang reflects Moon's willingness to improve bilateral relations following Yoshihide Suga's appointment as Prime Minister. Kang has pledged to make every effort to improve and normalize relations between South Korea and Japan, following deterioration in relations over issues of wartime labor and comfort women. He has relayed Moon's statement that the two governments should prepare solutions to the pending problems through dialogue and that they should cooperate where possible, including on the Tokyo Olympic Games.

== Election results ==
Year	Elections	Constituency	Political party	Votes (%)	Results
2004	17th National Assembly General Election	Jeju-Bukjeju A (Jeju)	Uri	56,608 (48.19%)	Won
2008	18th National Assembly General Election	Jeju A (Jeju)	UDP	32,707 (39.29%)	Won
2012	19th National Assembly General Election	Jeju A (Jeju)	DUP	42,006 (43.35%)	Won
2016	20th National Assembly General Election	Jeju A (Jeju)	Democratic	49,964 (47.98%)	Won
