= Jeju A =

South Korean constituency

- Single-member constituency for the National Assembly
- Location of the constituency
- District(s): Jeju City (part)
- Region: Jeju Province
- Electorate: 190,415 (2016)

Current constituency
- Created: 2008
- Seats: 1
- Party: Democratic Party
- Member: Moon Dae-lim
- Council constituency: 6th district 7th district 10th district 11th district 12th district 13th district 14th district 15th district 16th district 19th district
- Created from: Jeju–Bukjeju A Jeju–Bukjeju B

Jeju A (Korean: 제주시 갑) is a constituency of the National Assembly of South Korea. The constituency consists of part of Jeju City. As of 2016, 190,415 eligible voters were registered in the constituency.

== List of members of the National Assembly ==
| Election | Member | Party | Dates | Notes |
|---|---|---|---|---|
| 2008 | Kang Chang-il | United Democratic | 2008–2020 | Ambassador to Japan (2021–2022); Vice Chairman of the Peaceful Unification Advisory Council (2026–) |
| 2012 | Kang Chang-il | Democratic United | 2008–2020 | Ambassador to Japan (2021–2022); Vice Chairman of the Peaceful Unification Advisory Council (2026–) |
| 2016 | Kang Chang-il | Democratic | 2008–2020 | Ambassador to Japan (2021–2022); Vice Chairman of the Peaceful Unification Advisory Council (2026–) |
| 2020 | Song Jae-ho | Democratic | 2020–2024 | Chief of the Korea Culture and Tourism Institute (2006–2008); Chairman of the Presidential Committee for Balanced National Development (2017–2020) |
| 2024 | Moon Dae-lim | Democratic | 2024–present | Secretary for Institution improvement (2017–2018); Chairman of the Jeju Free International City Development Center (2019–2022) |

== Election results ==
=== 2024 ===
Legislative Election 2024: Jeju A
| Party | Candidate | Votes | % | ±% |
|---|---|---|---|---|
| Democratic | Moon Dae-lim | 78,776 | 62.88 | ▲15.08 |
| People Power | Ko Kwang-cheol | 46,503 | 37.11 | ▲0.04 |
| Rejected ballots | | 2,297 | – | |
| Turnout | | 127,576 | 59.66 | ▼1.7 |
| Registered electors | | 213,825 | | |
| Democratic hold | | Swing | | |

=== 2020 ===
Legislative Election 2020: Jeju A
| Party | Candidate | Votes | % | ±% |
|---|---|---|---|---|
| Democratic | Song Jae-ho | 61,626 | 48.7 | +0.7 |
| United Future | Jang Sung-chul | 46,909 | 37.1 | +0.4 |
| Justice | Ko Byeong-su | 9,260 | 7.3 | new |
| Independent | Park Hui-su | 6,901 | 5.5 | new |
| Our Republican | Mun Dae-tan | 773 | 0.6 | new |
| Independent | Im Hyo-jun | 547 | 0.4 | new |
| Independent | Hyeon Yong-sik | 524 | 0.4 | new |
| Rejected ballots | | 1,491 | – | – |
| Turnout | | 128,031 | 61.4 | – |
| Registered electors | | 208,660 | | |
| Democratic hold | | | | |

=== 2016 ===
Legislative Election 2016: Jeju A
| Party | Candidate | Votes | % | ±% |
|---|---|---|---|---|
| Democratic | Kang Chang-il | 49,964 | 48.0 | +4.6 |
| Saenuri | Yang Chi-seok | 38,257 | 36.7 | −2.4 |
| People | Jang Sung-chul | 15,914 | 15.3 | new |
| Rejected ballots | | 1,411 | – | – |
| Turnout | | 105,546 | 55.4 | −1.0 |
| Registered electors | | 190,415 | | |
| Democratic hold | | Swing | | |

=== 2012 ===
Legislative Election 2012: Jeju A
| Party | Candidate | Votes | % | ±% |
|---|---|---|---|---|
| Democratic United | Kang Chang-il | 42,006 | 43.4 | +4.1 |
| Saenuri | Hyun Kyung-dae | 37,878 | 39.1 | +7.0 |
| Independent | Jang Dong-hoon | 13,527 | 14.0 | new |
| Independent | Koh Dong-soo | 3,488 | 3.6 | new |
| Rejected ballots | | 923 | – | – |
| Turnout | | 97,822 | 56.4 | +4.1 |
| Registered electors | | 173,315 | | |
| Democratic United hold | | Swing | | |

=== 2008 ===
Legislative Election 2008: Jeju A
| Party | Candidate | Votes | % | ±% |
|---|---|---|---|---|
| United Democratic | Kang Chang-il | 32,707 | 39.3 | new |
| Independent | Hyun Kyung-dae | 26,711 | 32.1 | new |
| Grand National | Kim Dong-wan | 22,592 | 27.1 | new |
| Family Federation | Yoo Byung-nyo | 1,231 | 1.5 | new |
| Rejected ballots | | 808 | – | – |
| Turnout | | 84,049 | 52.3 | |
| Registered electors | | 160,569 | | |
| United Democratic win (new seat) | | | | |

== See also ==
- List of constituencies of the National Assembly of South Korea
