= Samuel Sangshik Han =

Samuel Sangshik Han is a Baptist pastor in New Jersey, USA. He was the president of a Baptist theological seminary in Republic of Korea. He has authored books in the area of biblical studies.

== Education and career ==
Samuel Sangshik Han received a B.A (economics) from Seoul National University. He then received an M.Div. and M.R.E. degrees at Korea Baptist Theological University. Han is a Baptist pastor, ordained in January 1988. He was awarded a Th.M. degree from Yonsei University and Th.D. from Canada Christian College. Han studied under the Ph.D. graduate programs of Jewish Theological Seminary of America, Edinburgh University, and Yonsei University and was awarded his Ph.D. degree by Pyeongtaek University (title: The Mission of Israel for Forming a Global Community: An Exegesis and Interpretation of Isaiah 60–62). Han has served as a professor of Old Testament Studies since 1999, and as the president of Berea University of Graduate Studies (Berea International Theological Seminary) for four years (2007–2010).

== Books ==
- Annotated Bibliography of Berean Studies (1965~2006) (Seoul: Berea International Theological Seminary Press, 2006). ISBN 89-956485-1-1
- Introduction to Old Testament Studies (UCM Biblical Studies Series 1; Seoul: PubPle, 2015) ISBN 978-89-24-02077-9
- A Study of Theophoric Personal Names in the Old Testament (UCM Biblical Studies Series 2; Seoul: PubPle, 2015)
- Re-Reading the Old Testament (UCM Biblical Studies Series 3; Seoul: PubPle, 2016)
- Israel and Biblical Interpretation (UCM Biblical Studies Series 4; Seoul: PubPle, 2016)
- An Introduction to Biblical History & Geography (UCM Biblical History & Geography Series 1; Seoul: PubPle, 2015) ISBN 978-89-24-03123-2
- An Intertestamental History and Biblical History & Geography (UCM Biblical Studies Series 2; Seoul: PubPle, 2015) ISBN 978-89-24-03122-5
