= WLD =

WLD or Wld can refer to:

- We Love Danger! or WLD! for short, a Canadian punk rock band
- Wermlandite, a mineral; see List of mineral symbols
- Wilderness Air, an airline based in Botswana, by ICAO code
- Williams Landing railway station, Melbourne
- Worldcoin, an iris biometric cryptocurrency project, by token ticker
- World Localization Day, an online global event founded by Helena Norberg-Hodge
- Strother Field, a public airport in Cowley County, Kansas, U.S., by IATA and FAA codes

== See also ==
- W. L. D. Johnson Neighborhood Library, a library in Houston, Texas, U.S.
- WLDC (disambiguation)
