= Min Byung-doo =

South Korean politician

- 민병두
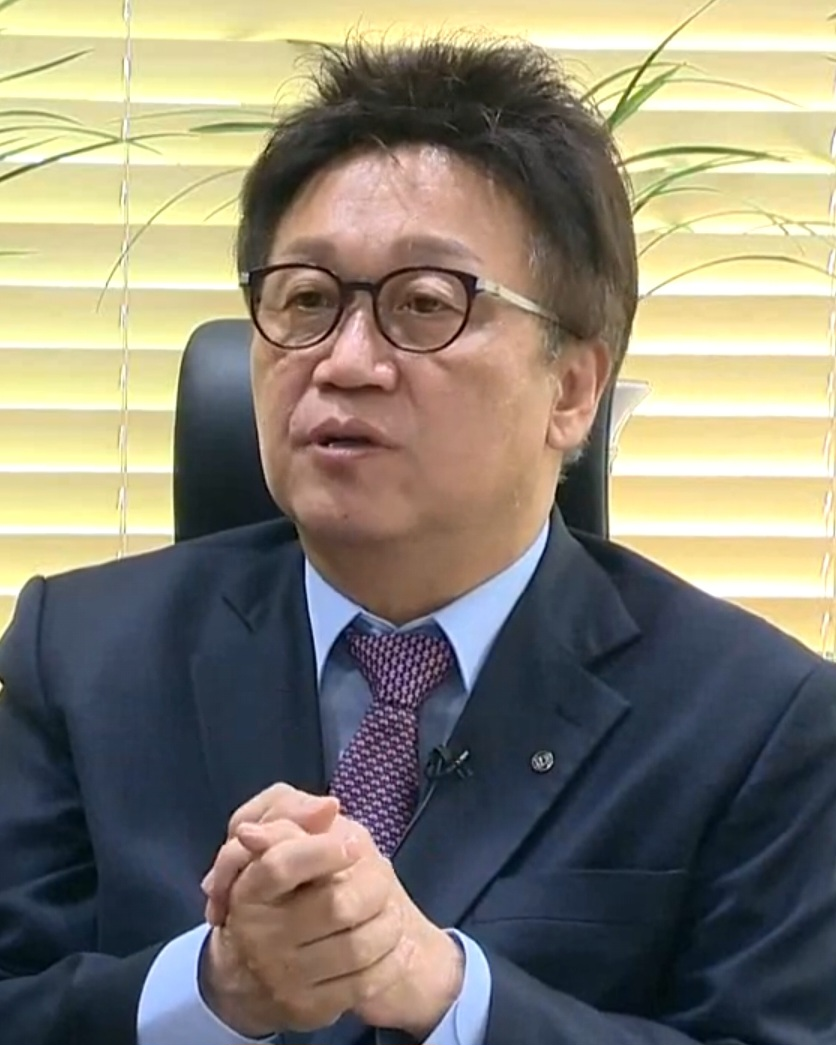

Member of the National Assembly
- In office 30 May 2012 – 29 May 2020
- Preceded by: Hong Joon-pyo
- Succeeded by: Jang Kyung-tae
- Constituency: Seoul Dongdaemun B
- In office 30 May 2004 – 29 May 2008
- Constituency: Proportional representation

Personal details
- Born: 10 June 1958 (age 68) Hoengseong, Gangwon Province, South Korea
- Party: Democratic
- Education: Sungkyunkwan University
- Website: www.bdmin.net

Korean name
- Hangul: 민병두
- Hanja: 閔丙梪
- RR: Min Byeongdu
- MR: Min Pyŏngdu

Min Byung-doo (Korean: 민병두; born 10 June 1958) is a South Korean politician in the liberal Minjoo Party of Korea who has been a member of the National Assembly for Dongdaemun, Seoul, from 2012 to 2020. He was formerly a party list member from 2004 to 2008.

Min is a proponent of economic democratization. In early 2013 he announced plans to introduce legislation to protect fair contracts between convenience store franchisors and their franchisees. Later that year, during an industrial dispute that led to K-pop group JYJ being blacklisted from major broadcasting stations, Min introduced a motion to call JYJ to testify before the National Assembly along with the founder of their former record label S.M. Entertainment, Lee Soo-man, and the president of the Korean Federation of Pop Culture and Art Industry, Yang Yi-sik. He criticized "large entertainment companies" for "using their influence to reign over broadcasting companies and singers".

In 2014, Min criticized civic groups involved in leaflet propaganda campaigns in North Korea for receiving public funding from the Prime Minister's Office. The director of the Union for North Korea Freedom, Kim Min-su, stated in response that the information was misleading, and that Min was either "not a decent person, or incompetent".

As a student in 1981, Min was handed a 20-year prison sentence for his participation in a militant pro-democracy student organization, the National Democratic Students' League. Hwang Woo-yea, who would later become chairman of the Saenuri Party, participated in Min's trial as an associate judge. The conviction was formally quashed in 2012. Min was arrested in connection to another organization, the "Constituent Assembly", in 1986. He eventually graduated from Sungkyunkwan University in 1990; the university later selected him for an alumni award in 2016.

Min was born in Hoengseong County, Gangwon. A Roman Catholic, he received the baptismal name Raphael.

== Election results ==
| Year | Elections | Constituency | Political party | Votes (%) | Results |
|---|---|---|---|---|---|
| 2004 | 17th National Assembly General Election | Proportional representation (18th) | Uri | 8,145,824 (38.26%) | Elected |
| 2008 | 18th National Assembly General Election | Dongdaemun B (Seoul) | UDP | 27,187 (41.07%) | Defeated (2nd) |
| 2012 | 19th National Assembly General Election | Dongdaemun B (Seoul) | DUP | 42,960 (52.88%) | Won |
| 2016 | 20th National Assembly General Election | Dongdaemun B (Seoul) | Democratic | 49,942 (58.16%) | Won |
| 2020 | 21st National Assembly General Election | Dongdaemun B (Seoul) | Independent | – | Resigned |
