= Lee Hae-chan =

Prime Minister of South Korea from 2004 to 2006

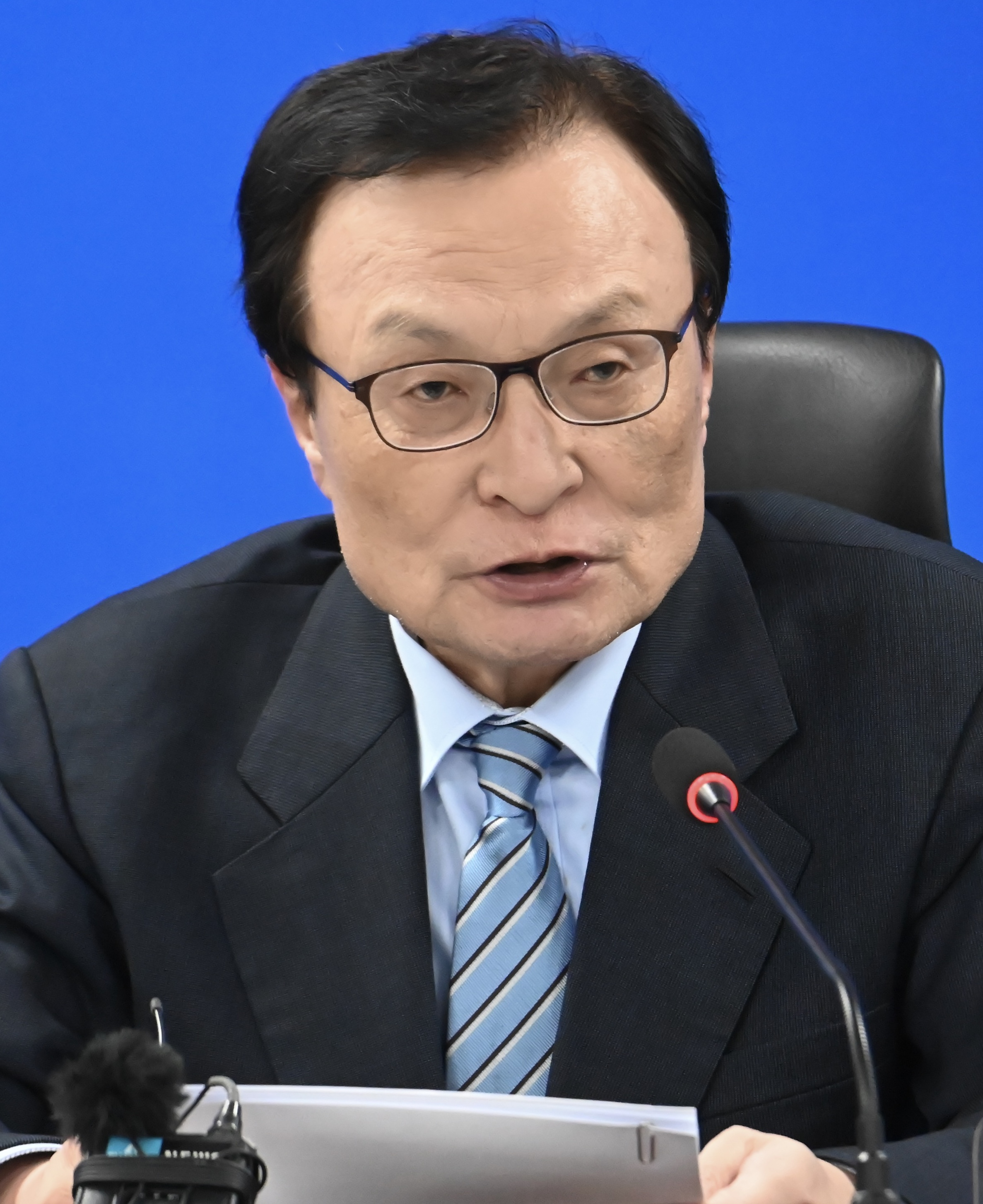
- Lee in 2019

Vice Chairman of the Peaceful Unification Advisory Council
- In office 28 October 2025 – 25 January 2026
- President: Lee Jae Myung
- Preceded by: Kim Kwan-yong
- Succeeded by: Kang Chang-il

Leader of the Democratic Party
- In office 25 August 2018 – 29 August 2020
- Preceded by: Choo Mi-ae
- Succeeded by: Lee Nak-yon

Leader of the Democratic United Party
- In office 9 June 2012 – 18 November 2012
- Preceded by: Han Myeong-sook; Moon Sung-keun (acting); Park Jie-won (Interim)
- Succeeded by: Moon Jae-in (acting); Park Ki-choon (Interim); Moon Hee-sang (Interim); Kim Han-gil

36th Prime Minister of South Korea
- In office 30 June 2004 – 15 March 2006
- President: Roh Moo-hyun
- Preceded by: Goh Kun; Lee Hun-jai (acting)
- Succeeded by: Han Duck-soo (acting); Han Myeong-sook

Minister of Education
- In office 3 March 1998 – 24 May 1999
- President: Kim Dae-jung
- Preceded by: Lee Myung-hyun
- Succeeded by: Kim Duk-choong

Deputy Mayor for Political Affairs Seoul
- In office 1 July 1995 – 26 December 1996
- Mayor: Cho Soon
- Preceded by: Kang Deok-gi (Deputy Mayor of Seoul)
- Succeeded by: Choi Soo-byeong

Member of the National Assembly
- In office 30 May 2012 – 29 May 2020
- Preceded by: Constituency established
- Succeeded by: Hong Seong-guk (Sejong A); Gang Jun-hyeon (Sejong B)
- Constituency: Sejong (Sejong)
- In office 30 May 1996 – 29 May 2008
- Preceded by: Himself
- Succeeded by: Kim Hui-chul
- Constituency: Gwanak B (Seoul)
- In office 30 May 1988 – 30 June 1995
- Preceded by: Yim Churl-soon, Kim Soo-han
- Succeeded by: Himself
- Constituency: Gwanak B (Seoul)

Personal details
- Born: 10 July 1952 Jangpyeong-myeon, Cheongyang, South Chungcheong, South Korea
- Died: 25 January 2026 (aged 73) Ho Chi Minh City, Vietnam
- Party: Democratic
- Education: Seoul National University (BA)

Korean name
- Hangul: 이해찬
- RR: I Haechan
- MR: I Haech'an

Lee Hae-chan (Korean: 이해찬; 10 July 1952 – 25 January 2026) was a South Korean activist and politician who served as the Prime minister of South Korea from 2004 to 2006 and as the Leader of the Democratic Party of Korea from 2018 to 2020.

Born in Jangpyeong-myeon, Lee was imprisoned twice for organizing protests against the Park Chung-hee and Chun Doo-hwan dictatorships during his time at Seoul National University. After the June Democratic Struggle, he entered politics and served as a member of the National Assembly for the Gwanak District B from 1988 to 1995 and 1996 to 2008. Between his terms as a legislator, Lee held office as the deputy mayor of Seoul in 1995.

Lee served as Minister of Education under President Kim Dae-jung from 1998 to 1999. He presided over controversial education reforms including revamping the college entrance process and lowering the retirement age of teachers. He later served under President Roh Moo-hyun as Prime Minister of South Korea from July 2004 to March 2006. During his premiership, he played a key role in advancing the Sejong administrative city project and finalizing Gyeongju as the site of the Wolseong Low- and Intermediate-Level Radioactive Waste Disposal Center. He resigned in 2006 following public criticism over his handling of a nationwide transport strike.

On 27 August 2018, Lee was elected the leader of the Democratic Party of Korea. He led the party to a landslide victory in the 2020 South Korean legislative election and remained an influential senior figure within the party. A close political mentor to Lee Jae Myung, he served as the vice chairman of the Peaceful Unification Advisory Council from October 2025 until his death in January 2026. Over the course of his career, Lee held senior political positions under all four liberal presidents of South Korea since the democratic transition in 1987—Kim Dae-jung, Roh Moo-hyun, Moon Jae-in, and Lee Jae Myung. He was posthumously awarded the Mugunghwa Medal of the Order of Civil Merit by President Lee Jae Myung.

== Early life and education ==
Lee was born on 10 July 1952 in Cheongyang County, South Chungcheong. His father, Lee In-yong, served as a local town head. In his memoirs, Lee described his childhood as comfortable.

He moved to Seoul for his education, graduating from Yongsan High School before entering Seoul National University in 1971 as a textile engineering major. He soon dropped out to pursue social activism and reenrolled the following year as a sociology major.

=== Activism ===
When President Park Chung-hee consolidated dictatorial power under the Yushin Constitution in October 1972, Lee joined the student movement. In the Democratic Youth League Incident of 1974, a court sentenced Lee to 15 years in prison for his involvement in the National Federation of Democratic Youth and Students, which opposed Park's rule. He was released after one year, when his sentence was commuted.

Lee entered the publishing industry and opened Gwangjang Bookstore in 1978 in Sillim-dong, in southern Seoul, just before his wedding. In 1979, the year of the 12 December military coup by Major General Chun Doo-hwan, he founded the publishing house Dolbegae.

Lee first met Kim Dae-jung in 1980, when Kim was under house arrest. In his memoirs, Lee wrote that he felt Kim lacked the will to confront the authoritarian government and concluded that he "could not trust him." That view shifted after Lee was arrested in June 1980 on fabricated insurrection conspiracy charges in which the new military regime accused Kim Dae-jung and other activists including Lee of plotting rebellion under North Korean direction. Lee changed his opinion after being "moved by [Kim's] concluding statement" at his trial. On trial with Kim, Lee famously declared his determination to "fight with my life until this land is democratized." He was jailed for 10 years, before being released under a special pardon in 1982.

Lee graduated from college in 1985, 14 years after his initial enrollment.

During the June Democratic Struggle in 1987, Lee served as the chief of the situation room for the National Movement Headquarters for the Attainment of a Democratic Constitution. In that same year, he entered mainstream politics by joining Kim Dae-jung's Peace Democratic Party and participated as a founding member of the liberal The Hankyoreh newspaper.

== Political career ==
=== Entry to politics ===
In 1988, Kim Dae-jung recruited him to run in the 13th general election for the National Assembly. As the Peace Democratic Party's candidate in Seoul's Gwanak B constituency, Lee defeated candidate Kim Chong-in from the ruling Democratic Justice Party of President Roh Tae-woo and the Reunification Democratic Party candidate of Kim Young-sam. Lee was subsequently re-elected in the 1992, 1996, 2000 and 2004 elections in Gwanak, and for Sejong in the 2012 and 2016 National Assembly elections, never losing an election, earning him the sobriquet "the king of elections".

=== National Assembly (1988–2008) ===
Lee shared his most intense political years with legislator and future president Roh Moo-hyun. The two first worked together on the National Assembly's Labor Committee in 1988, forging a relationship marked by mutual trust. In the same year, bipartisan agreement in the National Assembly led to hearings to uncover the truth about the 1980 Gwangju Uprising. Lee and Roh quickly emerged as one of the proceedings' breakout figures, earning a reputation for incisive, relentlessly detailed questioning, and was remembered by many as a defining image of democratic-era oversight. The relationship was so strong that when Lee faced the possibility of not making the party's candidate slate ahead of the 14th general election, Roh threatened to leave the party. Liberal politician Rhyu Si-min served as Lee's aide from 1989 to 1991.

Lee also served as deputy mayor of Seoul in 1995.

During the 1997 presidential election, Lee oversaw campaign strategy for the Kim Dae-jung campaign. Kim valued Lee's ability to analyze demographics, voter turnout and generational trends. After Kim's victory, Lee was appointed education minister at age 45.

=== Minister of Education (1998–1999) ===
As education minister under the Kim Dae-jung administration, Lee was tasked with a reform project for South Korea's notoriously rigid and corrosively competitive education system.

Lee was credited with "normalizing" school education by expanding high school equalisation policy, where which students were assigned to high schools based on preference, place of residence and balanced assignment, not on performance. Lee also moved to curb exam-driven schooling, including late-night self-study and frequent testing, and introduced a test-free admissions track, cracked down on corrupt practices such as illicit teacher payments, and lowered the teacher retirement age from 65 to 62.

The reforms, however, produced consequences that critics seized upon. With exam structures dismantled, students often left school early and flowed directly into private tutoring – blamed for deepening class-based learning gaps. The phrase "the Lee Hae-chan generation" entered the lexicon, capturing both the ambition of his reforms and the disruption they caused for a cohort that came of age under the new system. He was criticised for allegedly dramatically lowering the scholastic competence of the so-called Lee Hae-chan generation of then-high school students. Lee stepped down in 1999.

Lee helped the election of President Roh Moo-hyun as election committee planning chief for the Millennium Democratic Party in the 2002 presidential election.

=== Prime Minister of South Korea (2004–2006) ===
Following the acquittal of Roh by the Constitutional Court after his impeachment by the National Assembly, and the victory of the Uri Party in the 2004 National Assembly elections, Lee was nominated by President Roh for the office of Prime Minister of South Korea on 28 July 2004, and was approved by the National Assembly on 29 July. He took office on 30 July.

His nomination as prime minister was met with some resistance due to his record as minister of education, which many considered a failure. After taking office, however, Lee proved an able prime minister, being described by some as the most powerful prime minister South Korea had seen. The president focused on long-term strategic leadership while Lee took full command of state administration and policy implementation. By coordinating ministries and driving complex decisions to closure, Lee effectively popularized the concept of a powerhouse prime minister or "silse chongri" in Korean.

Lee was often regarded as uncompromising, and his blunt nature and confrontations with the opposition earned him the nickname as "Blunt Haechan" and "Scolding Prime Minister", but his directness was often seen as another facet of decisiveness and responsible politics. On one occasion, he warned that history would move backward if the conservative Grand National Party returned to power.

Lee led the Roh administration's drive for a new administrative capital in Sejong City. Even after the Constitutional Court struck down the original relocation plan in October 2004, Lee pushed forward an alternative in the form of an administrative-centered city, refusing to let the project stall.

Lee's premiership also saw the resolution of 20 year long debate over the siting of a nuclear waste repository. Under Lee's leadership, the government finalized Gyeongju as the site of the Wolseong Low- and Intermediate-Level Radioactive Waste Disposal Center in November 2005, an outcome widely seen as a rare instance of decisive closure on a long-frozen national dispute.

==== Golf-game scandal and resignation ====
On 1 March 2006, the Korean Railroad Workers Union and Seoul Subway Union went on strike. The strike of railroad and subway unions at the same time proved to be a fatal blow to the nation's economic activity, especially Seoul area, where traffic heavily depended on subway, which was controlled by the two unions. Prime Minister Lee was supposed to command the situation and mediate the strike; however, he was playing golf at Busan area with local businessmen, and this caused outrage among Koreans against Lee for not taking care of the government and people. Lee resigned as Prime Minister.

=== 2007 presidential bid ===
Lee ran for the nomination of the Grand Unified Democratic New Party for the 2007 South Korean presidential election, emerging in third place of the party primary.

=== Party leaderships ===
Lee then served as leader of the Democratic United Party from June to November 2012, which ended early amid deadlocked negotiations to unify the presidential bids of Moon Jae-in and Ahn Cheol-soo for the 2012 presidential election.

Lee was then elected leader of the Democratic Party in 2018 on a manifesto of "20-year plan for power". Leading the party to a landslide victory in the 2020 South Korean legislative election, this cemented Lee's reputation as a master election strategist for South Korean liberals, emphasizing on party structure and discipline. Lee retired as party leader in August that year, serving as a senior adviser to the Democratic Party and taking on roles in civic and peace-related organizations.

=== Relationship with Lee Jae Myung ===
Lee Hae-chan served as a powerful defender of Lee Jae Myung. In 2018, when pro-Moon Jae-in factions pressured the then-Gyeonggi governor to leave the party, Lee Hae-chan intervened. Lee Jae Myung considered Lee Hae-chan as a political mentor, frequently seeking his advice during periods of turmoil.

Lee's support continued after the party's defeat in the 2022 presidential election, calling on the party to consolidate behind Lee Jae Myung even as legal investigations and leadership challenges mounted. During the 2024 South Korean legislative election, he led the Democratic Party to another majority in the National Assembly as the party's co-campaign chief, together with leader Lee Jae Myung and former Prime Minister Kim Boo-kyum.

In November 2025, Lee returned to official service under the Lee Jae Myung administration as the vice chairman of the Peaceful Unification Advisory Council.

== Death ==
Lee died on 25 January 2026 at the age of 73 while attending a meeting of the Peaceful Unification Advisory Council in Vietnam, becoming one of a few South Korean prime ministers to die abroad. He reportedly collapsed while waiting for his flight at Tan Son Nhat International Airport in Ho Chi Minh City on 23 January. Diagnosed with myocardial infarction, Lee underwent stent insertion followed by extracorporeal membrane oxygenation treatment but was unable to recover despite significant medical assistance after suffering two cardiac arrests.

Lee's body was repatriated aboard a Korean Air flight from Tan Son Nhat International Airport, landing on the morning of 27 January at Incheon International Airport. Lee's body was welcomed at the airport by Prime Minister Kim Min-seok, National Assembly Speaker Woo Won-shik, Democratic Party leader Jung Chung-rae, floor leader Han Byung-do, Interior and Safety Minister Yoon Ho-jung, Unification Minister Chung Dong-young, and Cho Kuk, leader of the Rebuilding Korea Party.

Escorted by military honor guard, Lee's wake was held at the memorial altar of Seoul National University Hospital. President Lee Jae Myung posthumously awarded Lee Hae-chan the Mugunghwa Medal of the Order of Civil Merit on 27 January 2026.

The main funeral ceremony was then held at 9 a.m. at the National Assembly on 31 January, attended by President Lee with prime minister Kim Min-seok and National Assembly speaker Woo Won-shik giving the eulogy. Lee was cremated at 11 a.m. at Seoul Memorial Park in Seocho District, southern Seoul. Following the cremation, the procession stopped by the late former prime minister's home in Jeondong-myeon, Sejong. In accordance with his wishes to be laid to rest near his parents, Lee was buried at Eunhasu Park Cemetery in Sejong.

== Election results ==
Year	Elections	Constituency	Political party	Votes (%)	Results
1988	13th National Assembly General Election	Gwanak B (Seoul)	PDP	39,950 (31.18%)	Won
1992	14th National Assembly General Election	Gwanak B (Seoul)	Democratic	64,035 (44.69%)	Won
1996	15th National Assembly General Election	Gwanak B (Seoul)	NCNP	54,049 (44.74%)	Won
2000	16th National Assembly General Election	Gwanak B (Seoul)	MDP	48,751 (47.45%)	Won
2004	17th National Assembly General Election	Gwanak B (Seoul)	Uri	49,673 (41.11%)	Won
2012	19th National Assembly General Election	Sejong (Sejong)	DUP	22,192 (47.88%)	Won
2016	20th National Assembly General Election	Sejong (Sejong)	Independent	46,187 (43.72%)	Won

== National honours ==
- South Korea (2026)
  - Mugungwha Medal of the Order of Civil Merit

== See also ==
- Politics of South Korea
- Roh Moo-hyun

National Assembly of the Republic of Korea
Preceded by Yim Churl-soon; Kim Soo-han (Gwanak, Seoul)	Member of the National Assembly from Gwanak B, Seoul; 30 May 1988–30 June 1995; 30 May 1996–29 May 2008	Succeeded by Kim Hui-chul
New constituency	Member of the National Assembly from Sejong; 30 May 2012–29 May 2020	Succeeded by Hong Seong-guk (Sejong A); Gang Jun-hyeon (Sejong B)
Political offices
Preceded by Kang Deok-gi (Deputy Mayor of Seoul)	Deputy Mayor for Political Affairs Seoul; 1 July 1995–26 December 1995	Succeeded by Choi Su-byeong
Preceded by Lee Myung-hyun	Minister of Education; 3 March 1998–24 May 1999	Succeeded by Kim Duk-choong
Preceded by Goh Kun; Lee Hun-jai (Acting)	Prime Minister of South Korea; 30 June 2004–15 March 2006	Succeeded by Han Duck-soo (Acting); Han Myeong-sook
Preceded by Kim Kwan-yong	Vice Chairman of the Peaceful Unification Advisory Council; 28 October 2025–25 January 2026	Succeeded by Kang Chang-il
Party political offices
Preceded by Han Myeong-sook; Moon Sung-keun (Acting); Park Jie-won (Interim)	Chairman of the Democratic United Party; 9 June 2012–18 November 2012	Succeeded by Moon Jae-in (Acting); Park Ki-choon (Interim); Moon Hee-sang (Interim); Kim Han-gil (Leader of the Democratic Party)
Preceded by Choo Mi-ae	Leader of the Democratic Party; 25 August 2018–29 August 2020	Succeeded by Lee Nak-yon
