= Hong Joon-pyo =

South Korean politician (born 1954)

- 홍준표
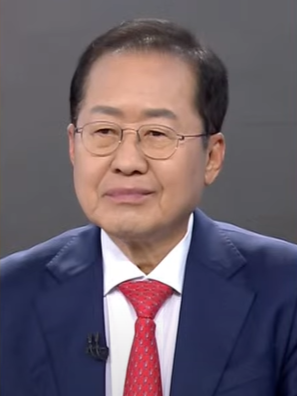
- Hong in 2025

Mayor of Daegu
- In office 1 July 2022 – 11 April 2025
- Preceded by: Kwon Young-jin
- Succeeded by: Kim Jeong-gi (acting); Choo Kyung-ho

Governor of South Gyeongsang Province
- In office 20 December 2012 – 9 April 2017
- Preceded by: Kim Doo-kwan; Lim Chae-ho (acting)
- Succeeded by: Ryu Soon-hyun (acting); Han Kyung-ho (acting); Kim Kyoung-soo

Member of the National Assembly
- In office 30 May 1996 – 9 March 1999
- Preceded by: Cho Soon-hwan
- Succeeded by: Lee Hoi-chang
- Constituency: Seoul Songpa A
- In office 26 October 2001 – 29 May 2012
- Preceded by: Kim Young-koo
- Succeeded by: Min Byung-doo
- Constituency: Seoul Dongdaemun B
- In office 30 May 2020 – 29 April 2022
- Preceded by: Joo Ho-young
- Succeeded by: Lee In-seon
- Constituency: Daegu Suseong B

Leader of the Grand National Party/Liberty Korea Party
- In office 4 July 2011 – 9 December 2011
- Preceded by: Ann Sang-soo; Chung Ui-hwa (Interim)
- Succeeded by: Na Kyung-won (acting); Hwang Woo-yea (acting); Park Geun-hye (Interim); Hwang Woo-yea
- In office 3 July 2017 – 14 June 2018
- Preceded by: Lee Jung-hyun; Chung Woo-taik (acting); In Myung-jin (Interim); Chung Woo-taik (Interim)
- Succeeded by: Kim Sung-tae (acting); Kim Byong-joon (Interim); Hwang Kyo-ahn

Personal details
- Born: 20 November 1953 (age 73) Changnyeong South Gyeongsang, South Korea
- Party: Independent (2025–present)
- Other political affiliations: People Power (2021–2025); Independent (2020–2021); United Future Party (2020); Liberty Korea Party (2017–2020); Saenuri Party (2012–2017); Grand National Party (1997–2012); New Korea Party (1996–1997)
- Spouse: Lee Sun-sam (m. 1976)
- Children: 2
- Relatives: See Namyang Hong clan
- Education: Korea University (LLB)

Korean name
- Hangul: 홍준표
- Hanja: 洪準杓
- RR: Hong Junpyo
- MR: Hong Chunp'yo

Hong Joon-pyo (Korean: 홍준표; born 20 November 1953 ) is a South Korean retired politician and prosecutor who served as the Governor of South Gyeongsang Province from 2012 to 2017 and as the Mayor of Daegu from 2022 to 2025. He also served five terms in the National Assembly and led the conservative Grand National Party in 2011, as well as its successor, the Liberty Korea Party, from 2017 to 2018.

He was the presidential nominee of the Liberty Korea Party in the 2017 South Korean presidential election and came in second place during the general election, losing to Moon Jae-in. Hong ran as a candidate in the 2022 South Korean presidential election for the nomination of the conservative People Power Party and came in second place during the primaries, narrowly losing to Yoon Suk Yeol. Hong was elected Mayor of Daegu in 2022, but he resigned to launch his third campaign for the presidency in the 2025 South Korean presidential election. Although he advanced from the first round, Hong ultimately failed to win the party primary, subsequently announcing his retirement from politics.

== Early life and education ==
He was born in Changnyeong, South Gyeongsang Province, South Korea. Hong graduated from Yeungnam High School and received a Bachelor of Laws degree from Korea University. Due to being underweight, he was discharged from the army after only fourteen months of service.

== Career ==
=== Entry into politics ===
In January 1996, Hong joined the New Korea Party. He was elected for the Songpa A constituency during the 1996 election and entered the National Assembly for the first time.

=== First tenure as party leader (2011) ===
Hong was formerly the chairperson of the Grand National Party (which changed its name to the Saenuri Party in 2012 and again changed its name to the Liberty Korea Party in 2017). He stepped down as the chairperson on 9 December 2011 and was replaced by future President Park Geun-hye.

==== Comments on Park Won-soon ====
On 20 October 2011, Hong criticized Seoul Mayor Park Won-soon's The Beautiful Foundation (아름다운재단) for sending money to left-wing citizen groups. Hong was known to have generated much criticism against Park Won-soon in regards to Park's possible allegation of extorting tax money for his oversea visits.

==== Comments on former Grand National Party ====
He considered to rename the Grand National Party to another name after Park Won-soon won the October 2011 election.

=== Governor of South Gyeongsang Province (2012–2017) ===
Hong was first elected as Governor of South Gyeongsang Province in 2012 and re-elected in 2014.

=== 2017 South Korean presidential election ===
Hong secured the nomination of the Liberty Korea Party. His campaign appealed to older, conservative voters with a platform describing Hong as a "strongman." Hong has stated he wanted to be a strong man similar to Park Chung Hee, a former Korean president and dictator who is popular with older conservatives and whose daughter Park Geun-hye was recently impeached amidst allegations of corruption.

Hong finished second among the five major candidates with 24% of the vote behind Moon Jae-in.

=== Second tenure as party leader (2017–2018) ===
Hong was elected as the leader of Liberty Korea Party following his loss in the presidential election. After leading the party to a massive loss in the 2018 local elections on 13 June 2018, Hong resigned as party leader on 14 June 2018.

=== Independent politician (2020–2021) ===
On 17 February 2020, the Liberty Korea Party dissolved and merged with several other parties to become the United Future Party. Hong left the United Future Party in March 2020 after party leaders decided not to give him a candidacy in any of the upcoming 2020 legislative elections. Running as an independent candidate, Hong won the National Assembly election of Suseong B in Daegu on 15 April 2020.

=== 2022 South Korean presidential election ===
On 24 June 2021, Hong rejoined the People Power Party (which had formerly been called the United Future Party until 2 September 2020) and signaled a presidential bid in the upcoming 2022 South Korean presidential election.

On 29 June 2021, Hong Joon-pyo officially entered the 2022 presidential election. He placed 2nd in the final round of the primaries behind the winner Yoon Seok-yeol, winning 41.5 percent of the votes. On 26 April 2022, Hong resigned from the National Assembly after he was chosen as the People Power's nominee for the Mayor of Daegu. He went on to win the election for mayor of Daegu and begin his term on 1 July 2022.

Following the 2024 South Korean martial law crisis in December, Hong did not explicitly state his support for any side, but said he understood the "loyalty" of President Yoon Suk Yeol while describing his actions as reckless and "making a scene". Later that month, Hong said that he would run for president in the event of an early presidential election. In February 2025, Hong said that he would step down as mayor in the event that the impeachment of Yoon Suk Yeol was upheld.

Hong claimed that in August 2022, Shincheonji leader Lee Man-hee told him that over 100,000 followers were directed to join the PPP as "responsible members" to support then-candidate Yoon Suk Yeol during the 2021 primary. Critics allege that this support was exchanged for Yoon, then Prosecutor General, obstructing a police raid on Shincheonji.

=== 2025 South Korean presidential election ===
A day after the removal of Yoon Suk Yeol from office by the Constitutional Court of Korea, Hong expressed his interest in a presidential bid, saying in a statement on Facebook: "I have been thoroughly preparing for this election, considering it the final mission of my 30-year political career. Starting next week, I will proceed step by step with the necessary procedures." Shortly before officially announcing his campaign for the 2025 South Korean presidential election, Hong stepped down as Daegu mayor. He officially declared his candidacy on 14 April. Although he advanced from the first round, he ultimately failed to make it to the runoff in the primaries held by the People Power Party. After his loss, Hong announced that he would retire from politics and leave the People Power party. Hong stated: "I am very thankful that I can graduate from my political life today honorably and cleanly thanks to the care shown to me by party members and the public over the last 30 years."

== Political positions ==
Hong is famous for his right-wing populism, advocating for social conservatism and hawkish approaches to diplomatic issues. However, he endorsed DPK candidate Kim Boo-kyum for mayor of Daegu in 2026.

=== Corporate corruption ===
Hong holds economically conservative views. He supports Korean conglomerates, also known as chaebols and wants to reduce the power of trade unions. When asked how he would respond to growing concerns around corrupt practices amongst chaebols, such as those that brought down former President Park Geun-hye's administration, he stated that he would reduce corruption by putting it through a "washing machine".

=== National security ===
Hong has supported maintaining a vigilant approach to national security, supporting the deployment of the Terminal High Altitude Area Defense (THAAD) from the United States. He supports "armed peace." Hong has stated that he supports the nuclear armament of South Korea.

=== Anti-LGBT stance ===
Hong has publicly indicated that he believes that AIDS and HIV are a result of homosexuality, in order to attract the support of conservative voters. In a televised presidential debate, Hong criticized Moon Jae-in on his stances on homosexuality and remarked gay soldiers were a source of weakness in Korean military.

Hong directed civil servants to obstruct the Daegu Queer Culture Festival in 2023 after attempts to halt the festival in court failed. Police intervened to allow the festival to proceed.

=== Death penalty ===
Hong supports the death penalty. In 2017, he said he would revive capital punishment if elected.

== Election results ==
Year	Elections	Constituency	Political party	Votes (%)	Results
1996	15th National Assembly General Election	Songpa A (Seoul)	NKP	41,257 (43.28%)	Won
2001	2001 By-election	Dongdaemun B (Seoul)	GNP	32,095 (50.56%)	Won
2004	17th National Assembly General Election	Dongdaemun B (Seoul)	GNP	37,058 (42.67%)	Won
2008	18th National Assembly General Election	Dongdaemun B (Seoul)	GNP	37,618 (56.83%)	Won
2012	19th National Assembly General Election	Dongdaemun B (Seoul)	Saenuri	36,182 (44.54%)	Defeated (2nd)
2012	2012 By-election	South Gyeongsang (Governoral Elections)	Saenuri	1,191,904 (62.91%)	Won
2014	6th Local Election	South Gyeongsang (Governoral Elections)	Saenuri	913,162 (58.85%)	Won
2017	2017 Presidential Election	South Korea	LKP	7,852,849 (24.03%)	Defeated (2nd)
2020	21st National Assembly General Election	Suseong B (Daegu)	Independent	40,015 (38.51%)	Won
2022	8th Local Election	Daegu (Mayoral Elections)	PPP	685,195 (78.75%)	Won

== See also ==
- 2017 South Korean presidential election
- Cabinet of Lee Myung-bak
- Liberty Korea Party
- Right-wing populism

Political offices
Preceded by Kim Doo-kwan; Lim Chae-ho (Acting)	Governor of South Gyeongsang; 20 December 2012–9 April 2017	Succeeded by Ryu Soon-hyun (Acting); Han Kyung-ho (Acting); Kim Kyoung-soo
Preceded by Kwon Young-jin	Mayor of Daegu; 1 July 2022–11 April 2025	Succeeded by Kim Jeong-gi (Acting); Choo Kyung-ho
National Assembly of the Republic of Korea
Preceded by Cho Soon-hwan	Member of the National Assembly from Songpa District A (Seoul); 30 May 1996–9 March 1999	Succeeded by Lee Hoi-chang
Preceded by Kim Young-goo	Member of the National Assembly from Dongdaemun District B (Seoul); 26 October 2001–29 May 2012	Succeeded by Min Byung-doo
Preceded by Joo Ho-young	Member of the National Assembly from Suseong District B (Daegu); 30 May 2020–29 April 2022	Succeeded by Lee In-sun
Party political offices
Preceded by Ahn Sang-soo	Floor Leader of the Grand National Party; 18 May 2008–20 May 2009	Succeeded by Ahn Sang-soo
Preceded by Ahn Sang-soo; Kim Moo-sung (Acting); Chung Ui-hwa (Interim)	Chairman of the Grand National Party; 4 July 2011–9 December 2011	Succeeded by Na Kyung-won (Acting); Hwang Woo-yea (Interim); Park Geun-hye (Interim leader of Saenuri Party); Hwang Woo-yea (Chairman of Saenuri Party)
Preceded by Lee Jung-hyun (Leader of Saenuri Party); Chung Woo-taik (Interim leader of Saenuri Party); In Myung-jin (Interim); Chung Woo-taik (Interim)	Leader of the Liberty Korea Party; 3 July 2017–14 June 2018	Succeeded by Kim Sung-tae (Acting); Kim Byong-joon (Interim); Hwang Kyo-ahn
Preceded by Park Geun-hye	Liberty Korea Party nominee for President of South Korea; 2017	Succeeded by Yoon Suk Yeol
