= Jang Kyung-tae =

South Korean politician (born 1983)

- 장경태
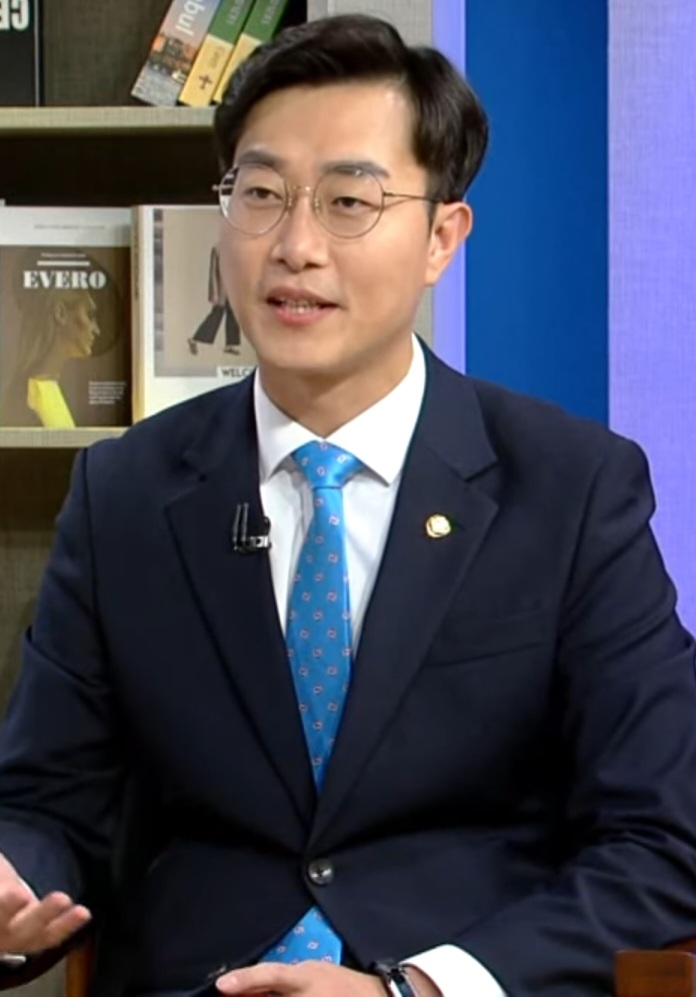

Member of the National Assembly
- Incumbent
- Assumed office 30 May 2020
- Preceded by: Min Byung-doo
- Constituency: Dongdaemun B (Seoul)

Personal details
- Born: 12 October 1983 (age 43) Suncheon, South Jeolla, South Korea
- Party: Independent
- Other political affiliations: Uri (2006–2007); UNDP (2007–2008); UDP (2008); Democratic (2008–2011); DUP (2011–2013); Democratic (2013–2014); NPAD (2014–2015); Democratic (2015–2026)
- Parent: Jang Hyo-shik (father)
- Education: University of Seoul; Yonsei University; Sungkyunkwan University
- Occupation: Politician
- Religion: Roman Catholic (Christian name : Andrew)

Jang Kyung-tae (Korean: 장경태; born 12 October 1983) is a South Korean Independent politician. he is currently the Member of the National Assembly for Dongdaemun B constituency.

== Early life and education ==
Born in Suncheon, South Jeolla, Jang attended Suncheon High School. Due to his financial difficulties, he once dropped out and was involved in labouring. He obtained a bachelor's degree in public administration at University of Seoul, as well as a master's degree in political science at Yonsei University. He is currently studying a doctorate in public administration from Sungkyunkwan University.

== Career ==
While studying, Jang joined politics as a volunteer for Kang Kum-sil, who contested for Seoul mayorship under the banner of the then ruling Uri Party in 2006 local elections. Prior to the 2007 presidential election, he helped Lee Hae-chan, a presidential pre-candidate for the United New Democratic Party (UNDP) who lost to Chung Dong-young. He unsuccessfully contested for the Member of the Seoul Metropolitan Council in 2010 local elections.

On 1 April 2013, he announced his intention to run as a candidate for a vice president of the Democratic Unionist Party (DUP), but later lost in preselection. In 2016 election, he ran 24th list in the Democratic Party list, but was not elected; in fact, only up to 13th were elected. As one of rare youth politicians in South Korea, his role model is Tony Blair and David Cameron; both started their political careers in 20s and later became the prime minister of the United Kingdom.

On 20 March 2020, Jang was selected the candidate of the Democratic Party for Dongdaemun 2nd constituency in April general election. However, shortly before this, Min Byung-doo, the then MP for the constituency, was excluded from preselection, and announced his intention to run as an independent candidate. There were speculations that this vote split would not lead Jang to be elected, however, on 9 April, Min announced his withdrawal as a candidate and endorsed Jang. On 15 April, Jang received 54.54% and defeated the United Future candidate Lee Hye-hoon, who was the MP for Seocho 1st constituency.

== Controversy ==
On 25 August 2020, during a YouTube livestream with another 2 Democratic MPs — Kim Nam-kuk and Lee Jae-jung, Jang triggered a controversy over his remarks against several United Future MPs who are also the members of the Legislation and Judiciary Committee (LJC). Shortly after Kim left the venue to join the LJC general meeting, Jang said, "LJC... sounds like fun, uh, no, not fun, but should be exciting." Soon, Lee asked him, "Are you enjoying their fighting?" Then, Jang replied, "Sorry to hear that. How come they talk nonsense... can I use the term bulls**t? How can we hear their bulls**ts?"

Following his remarks, Kim Do-eup, a United Future MP, accused Jang's remarks as an "insult towards the LJC members" and urged the Democratic Party to apologise. He also added that the party would take an action against Jang. Later, Jang apologised for his remarks.

he was expelled from the Democratic in April 2026 following allegations of sexual crimes.

== Election results ==
=== General elections ===
Year	Elections	Constituency	Political party	Votes (%)	Remarks
2016	20th General Election	Proportional (24th)	Democratic (2015)	6,069,744 (25.54%)	Not elected
2020	21st General Election	Dongdaemun B (Seoul)	Democratic (2015)	55,230 (54.54%)	Won
2024	22nd General Election	Dongdaemun B (Seoul)	Democratic (2015)	58,286 (54.62%)	Won

=== Local elections ===
==== Seoul Metropolitan Council ====
Year	elections	Constituency	Political party	Votes (%)	Remarks
2010	5th Local Election	Proportional (8th)	Democratic (2008)	1,790,556 (40.99%)	Not elected
