= Sejong (constituency) =

Constituency in South Korea, 2012–2020

- Former Single-member constituency for the National Assembly
- Location of the constituency
- District(s): Sejong City (citywide)
- Region: Sejong City
- Electorate: 167,748 (2016)

Former constituency
- Created: 2012
- Abolished: 2020
- Seats: 1
- Party: Democratic Party
- Member: Lee Hae-chan
- Council constituency: Sejong 1st–16th district
- Created from: Gongju–Yeongi
- Replaced by: Sejong A, Sejong B

Sejong (Korean: 세종특별자치시) was a constituency of the National Assembly of South Korea that existed from 2012 to 2020. The constituency consisted of Sejong City (citywide). As of 2016, 167,748 eligible voters were registered in the constituency. Ahead of the 2020 South Korean legislative election, it was separated into Sejong City A and Sejong B.

== List of members of the National Assembly ==
Election	Member	Party	Dates	Notes
2012	Lee Hae-chan	Democratic United	2012–2020	Deputy Mayor for Political Affairs Seoul (1995); Minister of Education (1998–1999); Prime Minister of South Korea (2004–2006); Chairman of the Democratic United Party (2012); Leader of the Democratic Party (2018–2020)
2016	Lee Hae-chan	Independent (Note: Returned to the Democratic Party after the election)	2012–2020	Deputy Mayor for Political Affairs Seoul (1995); Minister of Education (1998–1999); Prime Minister of South Korea (2004–2006); Chairman of the Democratic United Party (2012); Leader of the Democratic Party (2018–2020)
2020	constituency abolished			

== Election results ==
=== 2016 ===
Legislative Election 2016: Sejong
Party	Candidate	Votes	%	±%
Independent	Lee Hae-chan	46,187	43.7	−4.2
Saenuri	Park Jong-joon	38,076	36.0	+22.1
Democratic	Moon Heung-soo	11,191	10.6	−37.3
People	Koo Sung-mo	8,748	8.3	new
People's United	Yeo Mi-jeon	1,432	1.4	new
Rejected ballots		933	–	–
Turnout		106,567	63.5	+4.8
Registered electors		167,748		
Independent hold		Swing		

=== 2012 ===
Legislative Election 2012: Sejong
Party	Candidate	Votes	%	±%
Democratic United	Lee Hae-chan	22,192	47.9	new
Liberty Forward	Sim Dae-pyung	15,679	33.8	new
Saenuri	Shin Jin	6,455	13.9	new
Independent	Park Hee-bu	1,071	2.3	new
Independent	Koh Jin-chun	616	1.3	new
Independent	Park Jae-sung	336	0.7	new
Rejected ballots		1,039	–	–
Turnout		47,388	59.2	
Registered electors		80,028		
Democratic United win (new seat)				
