= WLDC =

WLDC may refer to:

- WLDC-LP, a radio station (105.9 FM) licensed to Goshen, Indiana
- World Long Drive Championship, a golf driving tournament
- Wolseong Low and Intermediate Level Radioactive Waste Disposal Center, a South Korean radioactive waste disposal facility
- WJEZ, a radio station (98.9 FM) licensed to Dwight, Illinois, which held the call sign WLDC from 1998 to 2003
- WLDC, a radio station (640 AM), on the campus of Loyola University New Orleans, which held the call sign WLDC from 1998 to 2003 and now broadcasts as Crescent City Radio
