= Dongdaemun B =

Constituency in Seoul, South Korea

- Single-member constituency for the National Assembly
- Location of the constituency
- District(s): Dongdaemun District (part)
- Region: Seoul
- Electorate: 148,013 (2016)

Current constituency
- Created: 1988
- Seats: 1
- Party: Democratic Party
- Member: Jang Kyung-tae
- Council constituency: Dongdaemun 3rd district Dongdaemun 4th district
- Created from: Dongdaemun

Dongdaemun B (Korean: 동대문구 을) is a constituency of the National Assembly of South Korea. The constituency consists of part of Dongdaemun District, Seoul. As of 2016, 148,013 eligible voters were registered in the constituency.

== List of members of the National Assembly ==
Election	Member	Party	Dates	Notes
1988	Kim Young-goo	Democratic Justice	1988–2001	Floor leader of the Democratic Liberal Party (1993); Minister of Home Affairs (1995)
1992	Kim Young-goo	Democratic Liberal	1988–2001	Floor leader of the Democratic Liberal Party (1993); Minister of Home Affairs (1995)
1996	Kim Young-goo	New Korea	1988–2001	Floor leader of the Democratic Liberal Party (1993); Minister of Home Affairs (1995)
2000	Kim Young-goo	Grand National	1988–2001	Floor leader of the Democratic Liberal Party (1993); Minister of Home Affairs (1995)
2001	Hong Joon-pyo	Grand National	2001–2012	Floor leader of the Grand National Party (2008–2009); Chairman of the Grand National Party (2011); Governor of South Gyeongsang Province (2012–2017); Leader of the Liberty Korea Party (2017–2018); Mayor of Daegu (2022–2025)
2004	Hong Joon-pyo	Grand National	2001–2012	Floor leader of the Grand National Party (2008–2009); Chairman of the Grand National Party (2011); Governor of South Gyeongsang Province (2012–2017); Leader of the Liberty Korea Party (2017–2018); Mayor of Daegu (2022–2025)
2008	Hong Joon-pyo	Grand National	2001–2012	Floor leader of the Grand National Party (2008–2009); Chairman of the Grand National Party (2011); Governor of South Gyeongsang Province (2012–2017); Leader of the Liberty Korea Party (2017–2018); Mayor of Daegu (2022–2025)
2012	Min Byung-doo	Democratic United	2012–2020	
2016	Min Byung-doo	Democratic	2012–2020	
2020	Jang Kyung-tae	Democratic	2020-present	
2024	Jang Kyung-tae	Democratic	2020-present	

== Election results ==
=== 2024 ===
Legislative Election 2024: Dongdaemun B
Party	Candidate	Votes	%	±%
Democratic	Jang Kyung-tae	58,286	54.62	▲0.08
People Power	Kim Kyung-jin	48,408	45.37	▲1.56
Rejected ballots		1,514	–	
Turnout		108,208	70.01	▲3.46
Registered electors		154,549		
Democratic hold		Swing		

=== 2020 ===
Legislative Election 2020: Dongdaemun B
Party	Candidate	Votes	%	±%
Democratic	Jang Kyung-tae	55,230	54.5	−3.7
United Future	Lee Hye-hoon	44,360	43.8	+5.6
Minjung	Kim Jong-min	1,198	1.2	new
National Revolutionary Dividends	Park Gyeong-hui	464	0.5	new
Independent	Min Byung-doo	Resignation	–	–
Rejected ballots		3,216	–	–
Turnout		104,468	66.6	+7.6
Registered electors		156,971		
Democratic hold		Swing		

=== 2016 ===
Legislative Election 2016: Dongdaemun B
Party	Candidate	Votes	%	±%
Democratic	Min Byung-doo	49,942	58.2	+5.3
Saenuri	Park Joon-sun	32,765	38.2	−6.3
People's United	Yoon Mi-youn	3,161	3.7	new
Rejected ballots		1,438	–	–
Turnout		87,306	59.0	+0.9
Registered electors		148,013		
Democratic hold		Swing		

=== 2012 ===
Legislative Election 2012: Dongdaemun B
Party	Candidate	Votes	%	±%
Democratic United	Min Byung-doo	42,960	52.9	+11.8
Saenuri	Hong Joon-pyo	36,182	44.5	−12.3
United Democratic	Kim Jae-jeon	1,238	1.5	new
Real Democratic	Jeong Byung-geol	852	1.1	new
Rejected ballots		468	–	–
Turnout		81,700	58.1	+11.6
Registered electors		140,616		
Democratic United gain from Saenuri		Swing		

=== 2008 ===
Legislative Election 2008: Dongdaemun B
Party	Candidate	Votes	%	±%
Grand National	Hong Joon-pyo	37,618	56.8	+14.1
Democratic	Min Byung-doo	27,187	41.1	new
Family Federation	Park Yong-man	1,388	5.7	new
Rejected ballots		–	–	–
Turnout		66,193	46.5	−17.1
Registered electors		144,162		
Grand National hold		Swing		

=== 2004 ===
Legislative Election 2004: Dongdaemun B
Party	Candidate	Votes	%	±%
Grand National	Hong Joon-pyo	37,058	42.7	−7.9
Uri	Heo In-hoi	35,950	41.4	−3.3
Millennium Democratic	Yoo Deok-yeol	9,981	11.5	−33.2
Democratic Labor	Jeong Ju-yong	2,537	2.9	±0
United Liberal Democrats	Kwak Min-kyung	1,281	1.5	new
Rejected ballots		716	–	–
Turnout		87,523	63.6	+4.6
Registered electors		137,569		
Grand National hold		Swing		

=== 2001 (by-election) ===
By-election 2001: Dongdaemun B
Party	Candidate	Votes	%	±%
Grand National	Hong Joon-pyo	32,095	50.6	+5.5
Millennium Democratic	Heo In-hoi	28,381	44.7	−0.4
Democratic Labor	Chang Hwa-shik	1,850	2.9	new
Socialist	Kim Sook-yi	1,152	1.8	new
Rejected ballots		521	–	–
Turnout		63,999	45.6	
Registered electors		140,280		
Grand National hold		Swing		

=== 2000 ===
Legislative Election 2000: Dongdaemun B
Party	Candidate	Votes	%	±%
Grand National	Kim Young-goo	34,796	45.1	+3.1
Millennium Democratic	Heo In-hoi	34,785	45.1	+12.4
United Liberal Democrats	Kwon Seung-wook	3,512	4.6	−4.5
Democratic People's	Choi Jong-geun	2,608	3.4	new
Youth Progressive	Nam Byung-hee	1,512	2.0	new
Rejected ballots		659	–	–
Turnout		77,872	59.0	−3.2
Registered electors		131,916		
Grand National hold		Swing		

=== 1996 ===
Legislative Election 1996: Dongdaemun B
Party	Candidate	Votes	%	±%
New Korea	Kim Young-goo	37,871	42.0	−2.0
National Congress	Kim Chang-hwan	29,482	32.7	new
Democratic	Kim Sung-shik	12,177	13.5	−28.1
United Liberal Democrats	Kwon Seung-wook	8,202	9.1	new
Independent	Kim Tae-woong	1,837	2.0	new
Nonpartisan People's Union	Park Sang-il	716	0.8	new
Rejected ballots		1,258	–	–
Turnout		91,543	62.2	−8.3
Registered electors		147,094		
New Korea hold		Swing		

=== 1992 ===
Legislative Election 1992: Dongdaemun B
Party	Candidate	Votes	%	±%
Democratic Liberal	Kim Young-goo	49,700	44.0	+13.6
Democratic	Koh Kwang-jin	46,962	41.6	+13.7
Reunification National	Yoon Keum-joong	13,069	11.6	new
New Political Reform	Park Sang-il	3,188	2.8	new
Independent	Koh Dal-joon	0	0.0	new
Rejected ballots		2,621	–	–
Turnout		115,540	70.5	−1.1
Registered electors		164,004		
Democratic Liberal hold		Swing		

=== 1988 ===
Legislative Election 1988: Dongdaemun B
Party	Candidate	Votes	%	±%
Democratic Justice	Kim Young-goo	34,821	30.4	new
Peace Democratic	Koh Kwang-jin	32,017	27.9	new
Reunification Democratic	Song Won-young	23,364	20.4	new
New Democratic Republican	Kim Tae-woong	15,352	13.4	new
Independent	Koh Dal-hu	5,043	4.4	new
People's	Jin Young-hyo	4,054	3.5	new
Rejected ballots		1,124	–	–
Turnout		115,775	71.6	–
Registered electors		161,730		
Democratic Justice win (new seat)				

== See also ==
- List of constituencies of the National Assembly of South Korea
