= Freedom & Innovation Party =

Freedom & Innovation Party 자유와혁신
- Leader: Hwang Kyo-ahn
- Secretary-General: Kim Jin-il
- Founder: Hwang Kyo-ahn
- Founded: July 12, 2025
- Registered: August 18, 2025
- Split from: People Power Party
- Headquarters: Cheongpa, Yongsan-gu, Seoul, South Korea 3rd floor, Bokjo Building
- Youth wing: Youth Committee
- Women's wing: Women's Committee
- Ideology: Conservatism; Anti-communism
- Political position: Right-wing to far-right
- Colors: Freedom & Innovation Red; Freedom & Innovation Navy; Freedom & Innovation Black; Freedom & Innovation White
- Slogan: A Top-Tier Nation: Freedom and Innovation; Securing a Future for Youth by Eradicating Election Fraud; Freedom and Innovation: A New Wave of Young Conservatism

Website
- Website, YouTube

Korean name
- Hangul: 자유와혁신
- Hanja: 自由와革新
- RR: Jayuwa hyeoksin
- MR: Chayuwa hyŏksin

The Freedom and Innovation Party (Korean: 자유와혁신) is a right-wing to far-right political party in South Korea. It was founded on 12 July 2025 by former Prime Minister Hwang Kyo-ahn after he left the People Power Party.

== History ==
Former Prime Minister Hwang Kyo-ahn decided to leave the People Power Party, citing reasons such as disappointment with the party and allegations of election fraud. Subsequently on 6 June 2025, he held an inaugural preparatory meeting in Gwanghwamun Seoul, laying the groundwork for the official launch of a new party with key objectives that included rooting out anti-state forces and ensuring the legitimacy of elections.

On 12 July 2025, the party held its central founding convention at KINTEX in Goyang, Gyeonggi Province. Hwang Kyo-ahn was unanimously appointed as party leader at the event, which was attended by approximately 2,500 members. In his acceptance speech, he pledged to uphold liberal democracy and achieve a transfer of power to a right-wing administration by carrying forward the spirit of liberty championed by Syngman Rhee and the spirit of innovation embodied by Park Chung-hee. He also outlined seven key tasks, including eradicating election fraud, defeating anti-state forces, guarding against the influence of North Korea and China.

An election for Supreme Council members was also held during the party's inaugural convention. Joo Eun-suk, a female candidate, was elected as a Supreme Council member. The voting was conducted via in-person ballot and manual counting. Following the inaugural preparatory meeting, Party Leader Hwang Kyo-ahn announced plans to expand the organisation to establish chapters across 17 cities and provinces nationwide; he stated that the party would prioritise forming chapters in key regions, such as Seoul, Gyeonggi and Incheon, before extending its organisational network to Jeju, Gangwon, Chungcheong and Honam.

== Policy ==
Key pledges include eradicating election fraud, ousting anti-state forces whilst upholding liberal democracy, and strengthening the ROK-US Alliance to establish a robust security posture. The platform also advocates for policies such as improving human rights in North Korea, preparing for unification based on freedom, normalising public education, and expanding measures to address the low birth rate.
