= Hwang Woo-yea =

South Korean politician

The Honourable Hwang Woo-yea
- 황우여
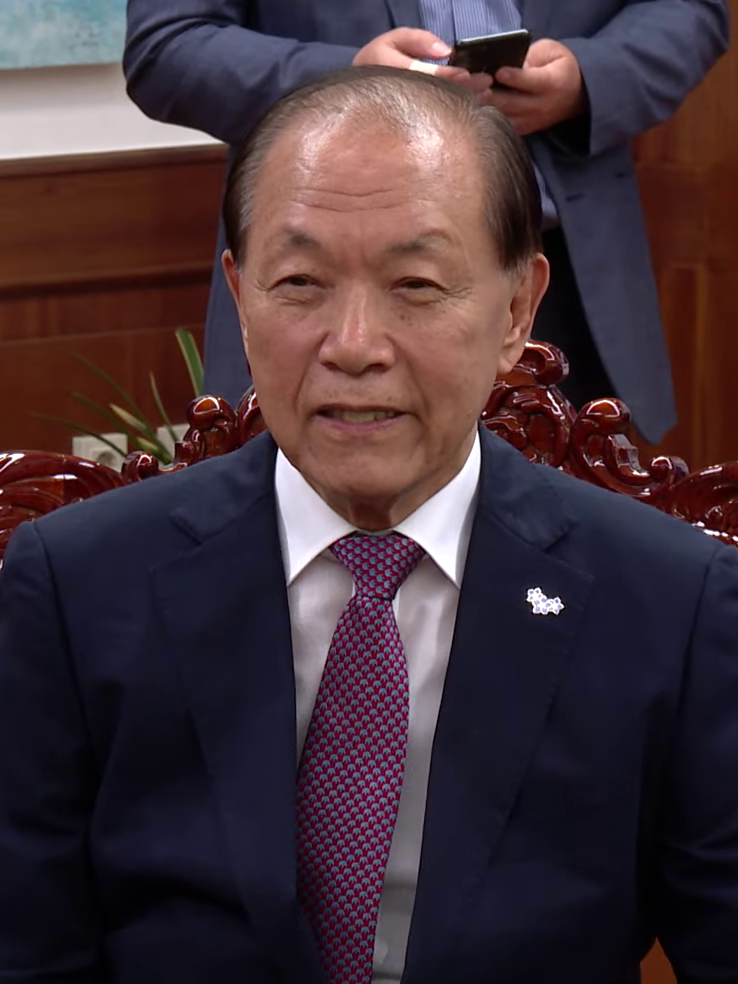
- Hwang in 2024

Head of the Emergency Response Committee of the People's Power Party
- Interim
- In office 2 May 2024 – 23 July 2024
- Preceded by: Yoon Jae-ok (Acting)
- Succeeded by: Han Dong-hoon

Deputy Prime Minister of South Korea
- In office 19 November 2014 – 12 January 2016 Serving with Choi Kyoung-hwan
- President: Park Geun-hye
- Prime Minister: Chung Hong-won; Lee Wan-koo; Choi Kyoung-hwan (Acting); Hwang Kyo-ahn
- Preceded by: Seo Nam-see
- Succeeded by: Lee Joon-sik

Minister of Education
- In office 8 August 2014 – 12 January 2016
- Preceded by: Seo Nam-soo
- Succeeded by: Lee Joon-sik

Chairman of the Saenuri Party
- In office 15 May 2012 – 14 May 2014
- Preceded by: Hong Joon-pyo; Na Kyung-won (Acting); Himself (Interim); Park Geun-hye (Interim)
- Succeeded by: Lee Wan-koo (Interim); Kim Moo-sung

Member of the National Assembly
- In office 30 May 2000 – 29 May 2016
- Preceded by: Seo Han-saem
- Succeeded by: Park Chan-dae (Yeonsu A, Incheon); Min Kyung-wook (Yeonsu B, Incheon)
- Constituency: Yeonsu (Incheon)
- In office 30 May 1996 – 29 May 2000
- Constituency: Proportional representation

Personal details
- Born: 3 August 1947 (age 79) Incheon, South Korea (then under US administration)
- Party: People Power
- Other political affiliations: Liberty Korea (–2020)
- Education: Seoul National University
- Occupation: politician

- Hwang Woo-yea
- Hangul: 황우여
- Hanja: 黃祐呂
- RR: Hwang Uyeo
- MR: Hwang Uyŏ

Hwang Woo-yea (Korean: 황우여; born 3 August 1947) is a South Korean jurist, politician, and former chairman of the Saenuri Party. As of 2012 Hwang represents the electorate centred on Yeonsu District, Incheon in the National Assembly of South Korea.

Hwang studied law at Seoul National University. He was a judge in courts in Seoul and other jurisdictions in South Korea before entering politics. Hwang has been elected to the constituency he represents five times.

In 2016 Hwang placed third on the Rainbow Vote list of 22 most homophobic politicians. He is well known for his role as the chair of the National Breakfast Prayer Committee meeting and as a key architect of anti-gay legislations in Korea. In 2014 he participated in organizing the International Solidarity Agency to Stop Global Homosexuality, a collaboration between Korean evangelicals and their counterparts in Haiti.

== Education ==
- Graduated from Incheon Songnim National School
- Graduated from Incheon Middle School
- Graduation from Jaemulpo High School
- L.L.B Faculty of Law, Seoul National University
- Master's in Constitutional Studies, Seoul National University
- Doctor's in Constitution Studies, Seoul National University

== Election results ==
| Year | Elections | Constituency | Political party | Votes (%) | Results |
|---|---|---|---|---|---|
| 1996 | 15th National Assembly General Election | National (15th) | NKP | 6,783,730 (34.52%) | Elected |
| 2000 | 16th National Assembly General Election | Yeonsu (Incheon) | GNP | 49,285 (52.42%) | Won |
| 2004 | 17th National Assembly General Election | Yeonsu (Incheon) | GNP | 50,156 (47.15%) | Won |
| 2008 | 18th National Assembly General Election | Yeonsu (Incheon) | GNP | 49,791 (59.03%) | Won |
| 2012 | 19th National Assembly General Election | Yeonsu (Incheon) | Saenuri | 63,441 (53.09%) | Won |
| 2016 | 20th National Assembly General Election | Seo B (Incheon) | Saenuri | 37,909 (37.92%) | Defeated (2nd) |
