= Cheongwon County =

Former county in North Chungcheong Province, South Korea

Cheongwon
- Former county
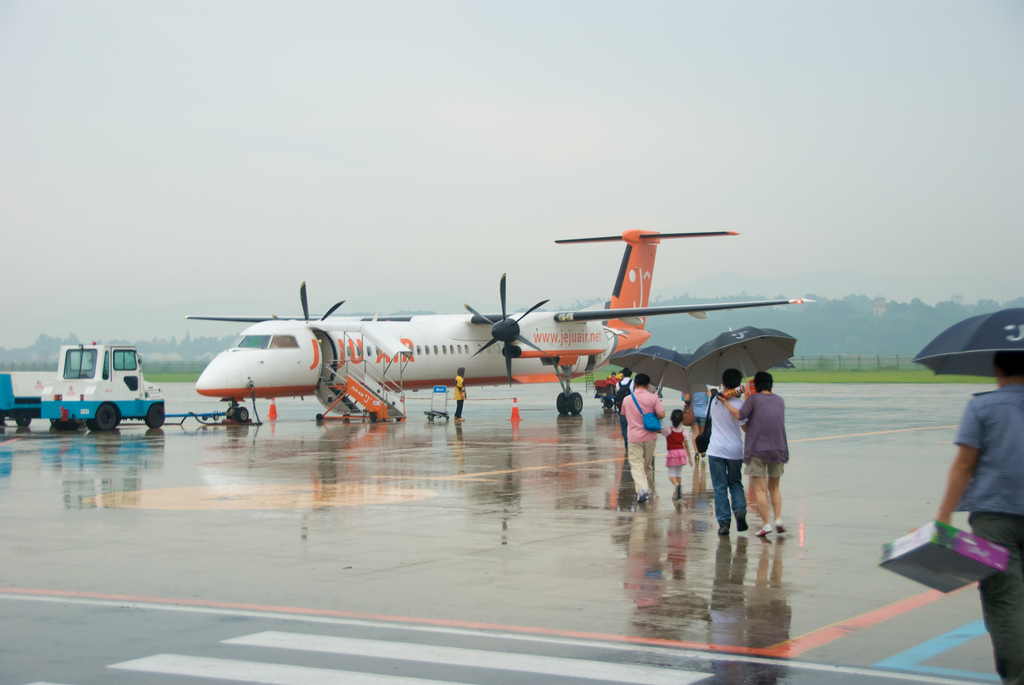
- Cheongju Airport located in Cheongwon

- Emblem of Cheongwon

- Location in South Korea
- Coordinates: 36°38′00″N 127°24′00″E
- Country: South Korea
- Region: Hoseo
- Province: North Chungcheong Province
- Administrative divisions: For present, see Cheongju

Area
  - Total: 779.06 km^{2} (300.80 sq mi)

Population (2001)
  - Total: 123,984
  - Density: 152/km^{2} (390/sq mi)
  - Dialect: Chungcheong

Korean name
- Hangul: 청원군
- Hanja: 淸原郡
- RR: Cheongwon-gun
- MR: Ch'ŏngwŏn-gun

Cheongwon County (Korean: 청원군) was a county in North Chungcheong Province, South Korea. It was dissolved on July 1, 2014 and consolidated to Cheongju.

== Government ==
The Korea Food and Drug Administration (later Ministry of Food and Drug Safety), and Korea Centers for Disease Control and Prevention were/are headquartered in the Osong Health Technology Administration Complex, which was once in Cheongwon County.

== Sister cities ==
Cheongwon was twinned with:

- Cangzhou, Hebei, China
- Kikuchi, Kumamoto, Japan
