= Kim Sung-tae =

South Korean politician (born 1958)

- 김성태
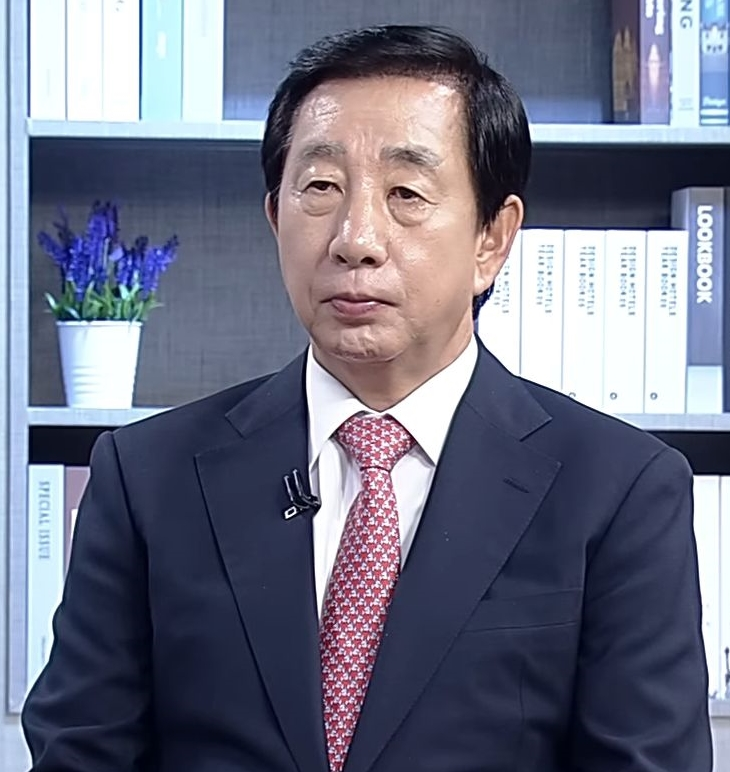

Chairman of the Liberty Korea Party Acting
- In office 15 June 2018 – 16 July 2018
- Preceded by: Hong Joon-pyo
- Succeeded by: Kim Byong-joon (interim)

Member of the National Assembly
- In office 30 May 2008 – 29 May 2020
- Preceded by: Noh Hyun-song
- Succeeded by: Jin Sung-joon
- Constituency: Gangseo B (Seoul)

Personal details
- Born: 23 May 1958 (age 68) Jinju, South Korea
- Party: People Power
- Spouse: Heo Deok-soon
- Children: 2
- Education: Hanyang University

Korean name
- Hangul: 김성태
- Hanja: 金聖泰
- RR: Gim Seongtae
- MR: Kim Sŏngt'ae

Kim Sung-tae (Korean: 김성태; Hanja: 金聖泰; born May 23, 1958) is a South Korean politician who was a labor activist.

== Early life and career ==
Kim Sung-tae was born on 9 July 1958 in Jinju, South Gyeongsang Province. He worked as a labor activist in the Federation of Korean Trade Unions as a young man.

== Political career ==
He was elected in the 1998 local elections and served as the Seoul Metropolitan Council member of the National Congress for New Politics. Later, he moved to the Millennium Democratic Party and the Uri Party, and joined the conservative Grand National Party for the first time in 2008. Then, he ran for the 2008 legislative election and won.

After the 2016 South Korean political scandal, he defected from the Saenuri Party in December 2016 and joined the Bareun Party, but was reinstated in May 2017, before the presidential election. In November 2017, he was elected floor leader of the Liberty Korea Party. Later, In June 2018, when Hong Jun-pyo resigned his party leadership, he assumed the acting leader.

== Election results ==
=== General elections ===
Year	Elections	Constituency	Political party	Votes (%)	Results
2008	18th National Assembly General Election	Gangseo B (Seoul)	GNP	45,284 (47.15%)	Won
2012	19th National Assembly General Election	Gangseo B (Seoul)	Saenuri	61,967 (50.35%)	Won
2016	20th National Assembly General Election	Gangseo B (Seoul)	Saenuri	45,861 (45.92%)	Won

=== Local elections ===
==== Seoul Metropolitan Council ====
Year	Elections	Constituency	Political party	Votes (%)	Remarks
1998	2nd Iocal Election	Proportional representation (2nd)	NCNP	1,718,888 (50.80%)	Elected
