= Kim Byong-joon =

South Korean politician (born 1954)

The Honourable Kim Byong-joon
- 김병준
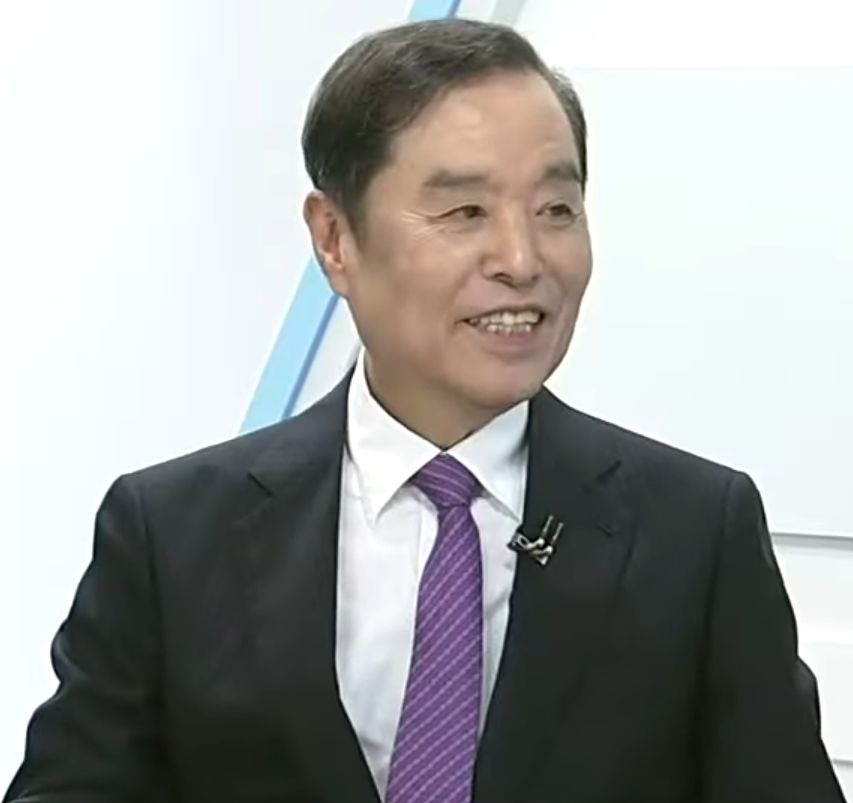

Chairman of the Liberty Korea Party Interim
- In office 17 July 2018 – 26 February 2019
- Preceded by: Kim Sung-tae (Acting)
- Succeeded by: Hwang Kyo-ahn

Minister of Education and Human Resources Development
- In office 21 July 2006 – 7 August 2006
- President: Roh Moo-hyun
- Prime Minister: Han Myeong-sook
- Preceded by: Kim Jin-pyo
- Succeeded by: Lee Chong-suh (Acting); Kim Shin-il

Personal details
- Born: 26 March 1954 (age 72) Goryeong, South Korea
- Party: People Power

Korean name
- Hangul: 김병준
- Hanja: 金秉準
- RR: Gim Byeongjun
- MR: Kim Pyŏngjun

Kim Byong-joon (Korean: 김병준; Hanja: 金秉準; born 26 March 1954) is a former chief of staff (minister), Presidential Office of National Policies, Republic of Korea/ the Deputy Prime Minister and Minister of Education and Human Resources Development. He was designated Prime Minister of South Korea by President Park Geun-hye, on November 2, 2016, but Park withdrew her designate November 8.

== Biography ==
Kim was born in Goryeong, North Gyeongsang Province, South Korea. He received his B.A degree from Yeungnam University in 1976, M.A degree from Hankuk University of Foreign Studies in 1979, and PhD degree from University of Delaware in 1984.

== Election results ==
Year	Elections	Constituency	Political party	Votes (%)	Results
2020	21st National Assembly General Election	Sejong B (Sejong)	UFP	31,495 (39.68%)	Defeated
