= Namjeju County =

Coordinates: 33°22′N 126°42′E

Namjeju
- County
- Flag Emblem of Namjeju

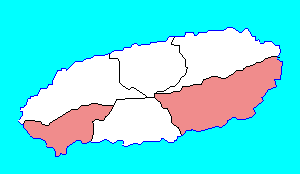
- Country: South Korea
- Region: Jeju

Population
  - Dialect: Jeju

Korean name
- Hangul: 남제주군
- Hanja: 南濟州郡
- RR: Namjeju-gun
- MR: Namjeju-gun

Namjeju County (Korean: 남제주군; lit. 'South Jeju County') was a county in Jeju Province, South Korea until July 1, 2006 when it was merged with Seogwipo City.
