= Wolseong Low- and Intermediate-Level Radioactive Waste Disposal Center =

Waste treatment facility in South Korea

The Wolseong Low- and Intermediate-Level Radioactive Waste Disposal Center (WLDC) is a facility used to safely house low- to intermediate-level radioactive waste (LILW) at Gyeongju in South Korea. The facility features a silo-type design, and its first stage allowed for up to 100,000 barrels of storage, which increased to a total capacity of 800,000 upon completion of the final stage.

South Korea's nuclear power program is fully integrated into the national infrastructure, supplying 30% of its electricity and 8.6% of its total energy usage. As of May 2012, a total of 21 reactors operated in the country generating 18.7 GW. Ongoing and planned projects are estimated to bring South Korea's generating capacity to 32.9 GW by 2030. Waste of low and intermediate levels was stored on-site at each plant; however, after nearly 30 years of energy generation from nuclear power, on-site storage began to reach capacity. Without a separate storage facility, South Korea's government estimated that the storage pools within the Kori Nuclear Power Plant, Ulchin Nuclear Power Plant, and Yonggwang Nuclear Power Plant would have filled by 2016, 2018, and 2021, respectively. The CANDU facility at the Wolseong nuclear power plant would have filled by 2017.

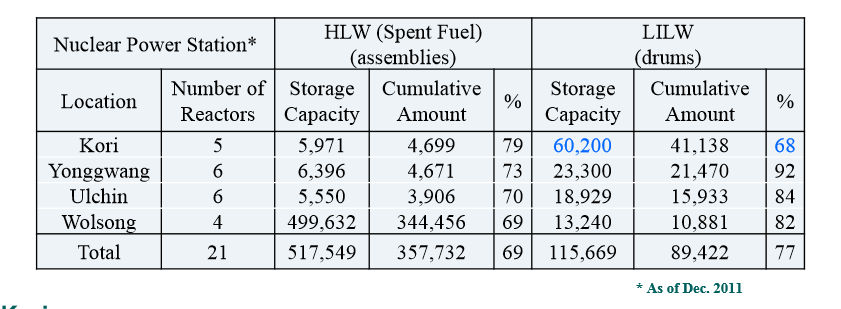
Select nuclear plant storage Capacities

Plans for storage facilities were being drawn up as early as 1986. However, the site was only selected in 2005. After obtaining the permits for the project from the Ministry of Trade, Industry, and Energy, and the construction and operation licenses from the Ministry of Education, Science and Technology, construction began in August 2008. By 2010, 1000 drums of LILW waste had been shipped and stored at the not-yet-completed site at Gyeongju. This was the standard-size shipment to be received on-site. Construction was completed in early 2015.

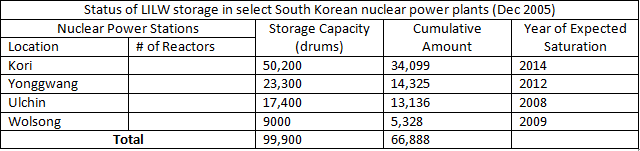
Years of expected saturation of LILW storage at select SK nuclear plants

== Background and Geology of the Gyeongju area ==
Gyeongju, located in a sediment-filled basin within the extreme southeast corner of the North Gyeongsang province of South Korea, boasts a population of 269,343 people as of 2008. In the past, Gyeongju was the capital city of the ancient kingdom of Silla and is now a culturally rich attraction.

The area designated for the disposal facility sits within the Gyeongju Basin, which is built mainly of sediments intruded by plutonic rocks. It is approximately 1.1 km by 1.8 km, with the Wolseong CANDU nuclear power plant to the south. The disposal facility sits above an area composed primarily of granodiorite; to the north, a small portion is underlain by biotite granite.

Nearby are the Taebaek Mountains, formed through ancient thrust faulting and subsequent fault-block motion, whose eastern reaching ranges form a steep fault line stretching to the coast. Korea is relatively geologically stable, though the Taebaek may experience slow but ongoing tectonic uplift.

The main source of water in the region is the Hyeongsan River. Regional topography consists of hills of elevation ranging from 100 to 250 meters with an overall slope eastward towards the sea. Streams mirror this eastward trend and empty towards the sea. Groundwater generally flows in an easterly direction, dependent on topographical hills, ridges, and valleys.

== Overview of Radioactive Waste ==
In Korea, radioactive waste is categorized as one of two types: low-and intermediate-level waste (LILW) or high-level waste based on radioactive concentration and degree of heat generation. LILW is categorized as having less than 4,000 Bq/g of alpha-particle emitting nuclides with a half-live for more than 20 years; additionally, the body's heat generation must be below 2 kW/m.

Low-Level Radioactive Waste (LLRW) includes radioisotope waste generated in industry, hospitals, research, and the objects associated with the nuclear fuel cycle. LLRW rarely needs shielding and consists mainly of items with short-lived radioactivity. Usually, they are compacted and shallowly buried. Materials include paper, clothing, and other materials that may have been exposed to radioactivity. Intermediate Level Radioactive Waste (ILRW)has greater levels and periods of radioactivity. These materials may require a geologic burial. These materials include resins, reactor fuel rod cladding, and strongly contaminated materials. High-level radioactive waste is generated as byproducts of the Nuclear fuel cycle.

== Site Selection and public opinion ==
After years of searching for a radioactive waste disposal site with 9 past failures, 2005 saw both the selection of Gyeongju, of the North Gyeongsang Province by the government and approval of the provincial populace for the site. With a 70% voter turnout, there was approximately 90% approval for hosting the disposal facility. The site is approximately 2.1 km^{2}. Data collected during the site characterization were used for an assessment of long-term performance-based partly on Hydrogeological and Geochemical characteristics and groundwater flow modeling. An environmental impact assessment was derived from this data as well. The permeability of the soils underlying the silo site is on the lower bound of regional values. This was in favor of selecting the site for a storage facility, as lower permeability is correlated to slower movement of groundwater and minerals. The local population approved the site due to increased incentives: the prospect of jobs, the promise of an initial payment of 300 billion Won ($270 million) with additional payments of 637,500 Won per waste drum, and the relocation to the city hosting the silo site of the headquarters of Korean Hydro and Nuclear Power.

Historically, there has been public mistrust of the government regarding environmental and nuclear issues. There have been past attempts at siting disposal facilities where initial reports indicated geologically safe conditions, but with issues springing up following initiation of the project. Additionally, the general public was troubled by past siting attempts, which were by their very nature undemocratic, lacked disclosure of information, and employed oppressive countermeasures against locals. These events promoted public skepticism towards the governmental expression of urgency over the need for a disposal site and gave opposing parties fuel against the use of nuclear energy. There is a fundamental difference in how either party (government vs. environmentalists) view radioactive waste. The government defines it as an indispensable by-product that is inevitably generated in an effort to solve the energy problem. The opposing side, usually joined by the locals, has it defined as a disastrous side effect caused by the use of nuclear energy, which should be fundamentally avoided. Often there is a conflict of interest between promoting the nation's productivity and the local economy. Additionally, there is a large gap between public perception of events and what is reported by experts, such as groundwater contamination. During the siting and negotiation process involving the Gyeongju site, the South Korean government included and highlighted economic incentives and benefits to locals for the hosting of a disposal site, rather than simply state safety statistics. In addition, tours of facilities were conducted in an effort to widen the scope of the public and gain acceptance of nuclear programs.

Site selection and operation falls under guidelines and restrictions set by the Atomic Energy Act.

== Construction and specifications ==
Designs were drawn for a LILW facility as early as 1993, with an ideal plan detailing five interconnected disposal caverns holding either ILRW or LLRW. Plans were also drawn for two disposal caverns for ILRW, one for dry LLRW, two for concentrated and dry active waste LLRW, and one LLRW repository for spent resins, filters, and concentrated wastes. Each cavern is designed to slope towards the entrance to prevent the pooling of groundwater.

The facility was planned to hold 100,000 drums containing LILW in its initial stage and 800,000 drums of waste upon completion. Deadlines indicated the operation of the waste site from 2008; however, the site began accepting waste in 2010 and was completed by January 2013. The repository type was finalized as a "near-surface vault".

- January 2006 saw Gyeongju as the selected site for LILW storage
- By February 2006, detailed site investigations and specific site designs were underway
- July 2006 saw the confirmation of an underground silo-type disposal method
- July 2007: Ministry of Trade, Industry, and Energy (formerly Ministry of Knowledge Economy) approves the project
- July 2008: Ministry of Education, Science and Technology grants construction and operation permits
- By 2010 the first 1000 drums of waste were stored
- January 2013 marks the start of a fully operational facility

== Nuclear power plant specifications ==
The four reactors at the Wolseong nuclear power plant are of CANDU, heavy water type, whereas the other seventeen reactors currently in South Korea are of the type LWR. CANDU reactors have the potential to use any uranium recovered from the waste from LWR reactors. These twenty-one reactors contribute about 70% of the LILW waste needing treatment and storage.

== LILW Management ==
LILWs are created from commercial nuclear power plants (NPP), research institutes, nuclear fuel manufacturing facilities, and spent radioisotopes. NPP LILWs consist of miscellaneous radioactive solids, spent resins, and cartridge filters. All compressible solids are compressed in an effort to reduce volume.

Volume reduction methods aimed at solid waste include concentrate waste drying systems and spent resin waste drying systems. Within all LWRs, ion exchange and evaporation is used to concentrate the waste.

Transport of nuclear waste will be done by ship 'HJ', which has a carrying capacity of 1520 drums; shipments will be made in groups of 1000. On-site, waste drums will be sequestered in baskets or containers for ease of handling. Loading for LLRW will be handled by forklifts, whereas loading of ILRW will be handled by overhead cranes.

== Risk ==
The concrete lining surrounding the disposal site will slowly increase its permeability over time due to degradation. This presents the possibility of a radionuclide leak into the groundwater system. Degradation occurs in part due to attacks by sulfates, corrosion, and expansion of steel reinforcements, leaching and loss of calcium, and other various chemical interactions caused by interaction with the water table. Dissolution by sulfate attacks is estimated to be 1.03*10^-3 cm/yr, which has been determined to be negligible. Leaching of calcium hydroxide is calculated to be 2*10^-3 cm/yr, also determined to be insignificant. However, attack by chlorides on the steel has determined to be 4.3*10^-2 cm/year, resulting in complete degradation after 1400 years; these values are hardly negligible and represent warnings of the possibility of leaching of radionuclides due to a weakened barrier.

The hydraulic conductivity of the underlying soils is about 2.6–4.5 * 10^-6 m/s with a mean bulk porosity of 0.34. The permeability of the soil regime underlying the waste disposal site is 4.5x10^-8 m/s. The area underlying the silo's site contains minerals indicating hydrothermal circulation and alteration. Alteration minerals demonstrate the presence of actively circulating waters, and the region presents the potential of moving radioactive elements from a leak at a rate of at least 1/5-meter per day during periods of groundwater flow.

Safety assessment of radionuclide leak through several scenarios satisfied regulatory criteria.

== Korea Radioactive Waste Agency ==
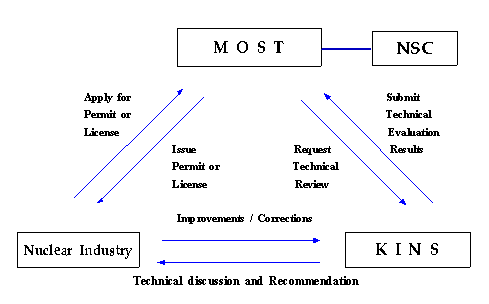
South Korean Nuclear Agency Interplay

The Ministry of Education, Science, and Technology (MEST) contains both KAERI and KINS under it.

The Korean Atomic Energy Commission (KAEC) is the highest order policy-making body on nuclear matters. South Korea's Prime Minister is the chairperson overseeing such matters.

As of 2009, all nuclear waste disposal falls under the authority of the Korea Radioactive Waste Agency (KORAD), formerly the Korea Radioactive Waste Management Corporation (KRMC). Their responsibilities include the construction of disposal sites, actual disposal, and research and development with regards to waste management.

The Ministry of Science and Technology (South Korea) has general responsibilities of protecting the public's health and safety by establishing and carrying out nuclear regulatory policies concerning research and design of various aspects of nuclear energy and its peaceful application.

Carrying out safety reviews and inspections required to enforce the policies set in place by the Ministry of Science and Technology (South Korea), as well as setting standards for safety, is the Korea Institute of Nuclear Safety (KINS).

The Nuclear Safety Commission (NSC), a branch within the KINS, has the task of being the decision-making body on nuclear safety and regulatory policies, as well as licensing.
