= Korea Baptist Theological University and Seminary =

Private university in Daejeon, South Korea

Coordinates: 36.3851°N 127.3268°E

Korea Baptist Theological University
- Type: Private
- Established: 1953
- Affiliations: Korea Baptist Convention
- President: Kuk-won Bae
- Location: San 14, Hagi-dong, Yuseong-gu, Daejeon, 305-358, Korea, Daejeon, Daejeon, South Korea
- Campus: Urban(Daejeon Campus)
- Website: Official website

Korean name
- Hangul: 침례신학대학교
- Hanja: 浸禮神學大學校
- RR: Chimnye sinhak daehakgyo
- MR: Ch'imnye sinhak taehakkyo

Korea Baptist Theological University and Seminary (KBTUS) is a private Baptist University in Daejeon, South Korea. It is affiliated with the Korea Baptist Convention.

== History ==
It was founded in 1953 by the Korea Baptist Convention. Established departments include the Department of Theology, Christian Education, Church Music, Social Welfare, Early Childhood Education, Counseling Psychology, and English.

== See also ==
- List of colleges and universities in South Korea
- Education in South Korea
