= Peaceful Unification Advisory Council =

South Korean government organization

- 민주평화통일자문회의

Constitutional Agency overview
- Formed: 27 October 1980 (Advisory Council on Peaceful Unification); 29 October 1987 (National Unification Advisory Council)
- Preceding Constitutional Agency: National Conference for Unification
- Jurisdiction: South Korea
- Headquarters: 84 Jangchungdan-ro, Jung-gu, Seoul 04605, Republic of Korea
- Minister responsible: Lee Jae-myung, President of South Korea, Chairperson of National Unification Advisory Council
- Constitutional Agency executives: Kang Chang-il, Executive Vice-Chairperson and Chair of the Steering Committee of the Agency; Bang Yong-seung, Secretary General
- Website: www.nuac.go.kr/english/ (in English)

Korean name
- Hangul: 민주평화통일자문회의
- Hanja: 民主平和統一諮問會議
- RR: Minju pyeonghwa tongil jamun hoeui
- MR: Minju p'yŏnghwa t'ongil chamun hoeŭi

The Peaceful Unification Advisory Council (Korean: 민주평화통일자문회의) is the constitutional organization, established in accordance with the Article 92 of the Constitution of the Republic of Korea and the National Unification Advisory Council Act (Korea) to advise the President of South Korea on the formulation of peaceful unification policy. This had been organized in October 1980. The National Unification Advisory Council is established at 27 October 1980, under South Korean President Chun Doo-hwan, as Advisory Council on Peaceful Unification Policy.

The Chairperson of the Council is the President of South Korea and the Executive Vice-Chairperson is a minister-levelled officer. Upon the inauguration of the new executive vice-person, the organization changed its English name from NUAC to PUAC, The Peaceful Unification Advisory Council. In 2017, the 18th National Unification Advisory Council was launched.

== History ==
After the Korean War, the divided South and North Korea was under an unsettling environment of hostility. Multiple violent clashes along the Joint Security Area, assassination of the Korean President Park Jung-hee, and diplomatic competition drove the two nations only but further from each other. The National Unification Advisory Council is established at 27 October 1980 as Advisory Council on Peaceful Unification Policy. The Act of the Advisory Council on Peaceful Unification Policy (Act No. 3383) was promulgated on 14 March 1981. The Secretariat of the Advisory Council on Peaceful Unification Policy was established on 7 April 1981. The 1st Advisory Council on Peaceful Unification Policy was launched on 5 June 1981.

The Advisory Council on Peaceful Unification Policy was renamed into National Unification Advisory Council as Article 92 of the Constitution on 29 October 1988. The National Unification Advisory Council Act (Act No. 4000, partially amended) was promulgated on 17 February 1988. The 16th NUAC was launched on 1 July 2013. The 17th NUAC was launched on 1 July 2015.

== Functions ==
The Peaceful Unification Advisory Council advises by request and makes proposals to the President of the Republic of Korea regarding policy development and implementation for a democratic and peaceful inter-Korean unification. The function of Peaceful Unification Advisory Council are:

1. Gathering public opinion in Korea and foreign countries concerning unification
2. Gathering the national consensus concerning unification
3. Focusing the nation's intent and capacity concerning unification
4. Other matters necessary for advising and making recommendations on the President's policies for peaceful unification.

The specific positions and departments of the organization are as follows:

1. Chairman - The incumbent president serves as the president.
  1. Senior Vice Chair
    1. Secretary to the Senior Vice Chair - This is a Level 5 bureaucrat.
  2. Steering Committee - Consists of 50 members. The Senior Vice Chair will serve as the Steering Committee Chairman.
  3. Secretariat
  4. Standing Committees
    1. Subcommittees - Specialized committees for each subdivision are composed of 10 subcommittees: Planning/Coordination, Peace/Legislation, International Cooperation, Economy/Science, Society/Culture, Health/Environment, Religion/Humanitarian Cooperation, Regional Cooperation, Public Communication, and Youth/Education.
  5. Regional Meetings - There are 17 regional conferences in Korea and 5 regions in Japan, China, Asia-Pacific, the Americas, and Europe, the Middle East, and Africa. Regional meetings are represented by the Regional Vice Chair
    1. Regional councils - It is composed of 228 cities, counties, and districts in Korea and 45 regions in 131 countries overseas.

== Composition and activities ==
Peaceful Unification Advisory Council members are appointed by President of the Republic of Korea to represent the national aspiration and determination towards a democratic and peaceful unification on the Korean Peninsula both domestically and across the globe. As of November 1, 2025, there are 45 regions in 137 countries.. The members comes from local representatives elected by local residents, and the representatives of political parties, functional organizations, major social groups and overseas Korean communities. In particular, with the balanced participation of local assembly persons elected by local citizens and leading figures from every corner of the Korean community at home and abroad, the NUAC serves as a truly nationwide, non-partisan organization, encompassing every region, class, political affiliation and generation.

=== Appointment procedure ===
Peaceful Unification Advisory Council members are appointed by President of the Republic of Korea on recommendations from those stipulated by the NUAC Act and the Enforcement Decree. NUAC members is grouped into three groups, those are local representatives, functional representatives and overseas representatives. Local Representatives members are Local Assemblypersons elected by local residents which recommended by Secretary General of the NUAC. Functional Representatives are group of leaders of each city, province, county and district, five North Korean province representatives, leaders recommended by chairpersons of political parties or a National Assembly member, representatives of major social and vocational organizations, and other persons who have contributed to or are capable of contributing to carrying out unification duties. Overseas representatives are recommended by heads of relevant diplomatic offices.

== See also ==
- Ministry of Unification
- Foreign relations of South Korea
- Division of Korea
- Minister of Intra-German Relations
- Committee for the Peaceful Reunification of the Fatherland
