= Bukjeju County =

Bukjeju
- Former county
- Flag Emblem of Bukjeju

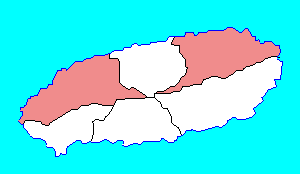
- Country: South Korea
- Region: Jeju

Population
  - Dialect: Jeju

Korean name
- Hangul: 북제주군
- Hanja: 北濟州郡
- RR: Bukjeju-gun
- MR: Pukcheju-gun

Bukjeju County (Korean: 북제주군; lit. 'North Jeju County') was a county in Jeju Province, South Korea until July 1, 2006, when it was merged with Jeju City.
