= Korea Baptist Convention =

Christian denomination in South Korea

- Abbreviation: KBC
- Classification: Protestant
- Orientation: Baptist
- Scripture: Protestant Bible
- Theology: Evangelical Baptist
- Associations: Baptist World Alliance
- Headquarters: Seoul, South Korea
- Origin: 1949
- Congregations: 3,442
- Members: 530,000
- Missionary organization: Council of Foreign Missions
- Tertiary institutions: Korea Baptist Theological University and Seminary
- Official website: koreabaptist.or.kr

The Korea Baptist Convention is a Baptist Christian denomination in South Korea. It is affiliated with the Baptist World Alliance. The headquarters is in Seoul.

== History ==
The Korea Baptist Convention has its origins in the early Baptist churches established by Canadian missionary Malcolm Fenwick in 1896. The International Mission Board of Southern Baptist Convention also contributed to the planting of churches. The Convention is officially founded in 1949. According to a census published by the association in 2023, it claimed 3,442 churches and 530,000 members.

== Schools ==
It has 1 affiliated University, the Korea Baptist Theological University and Seminary in Daejeon founded in 1953

== Missionary Organization ==
The Convention has a missionary organization, the Council of Foreign Missions.

== See also ==
- Bible
- Born again
- Baptist beliefs
- Jesus Christ
- Believers' Church
