= Bo-ra =

- Hangul: 보라
- RR: Bora
- MR: Pora

Bo-ra (Korean: 보라) is a Korean given name. The word itself is a native Korean word meaning "purple" and does not have corresponding hanja. However, since Korean given names can be created arbitrarily, it may also be a name with hanja (e.g. 寶羅 or 補羅).

People with this given name include:

- Geum Bo-ra (born Son Mi-ja, 1961), South Korean actress
- Hwang Bo-ra (born 1983), South Korean actress
- Jin Bora (born 1987), South Korean jazz pianist
- Sunday (singer) (born Jin Bo-ra, 1987), South Korean singer, member of girl group The Grace
- Lee Bo-ra (born 1986), South Korean speed skater
- Nam Bo-ra (born 1989), South Korean actress
- Shin Bo-ra (born 1987), South Korean comedian
- Shin Yeon-suh (born Shin Bora, 1993), South Korean singer and actress
- Kim Bora (disambiguation), multiple people:
  - Kim Bo-ra (politician) (born 1969), South Korean politician
  - Kim Bora (born 1981), South Korean filmmaker
  - Kim Bo-ra (born 1995), South Korean actress
  - Bora (singer) (born Kim Bo-ra, 1999), South Korean singer and actress
- Bora Yoon (American musician) (born 1980), American experimental musician
- Yoon Bo-ra (born 1989), South Korean singer

== See also ==
- List of Korean given names
