= Albanian–Yugoslav border conflict (1948–1954) =

1948–1954: A period of tension and disputes between Albania and Yugoslavia

Albanian–Yugoslav conflict
- Part of the Cold War and the Informbiro period
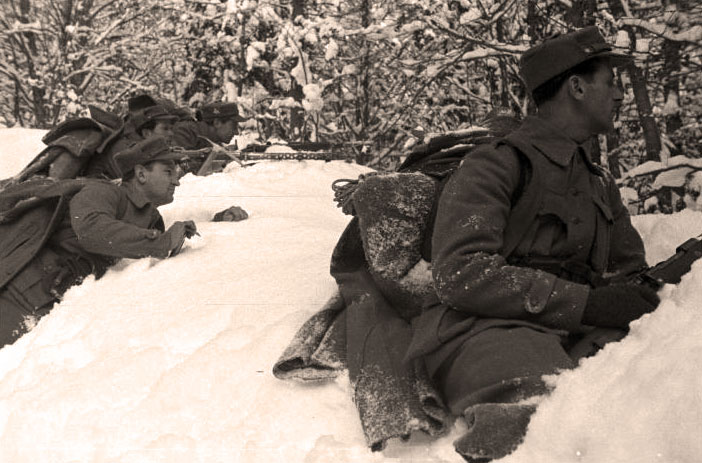
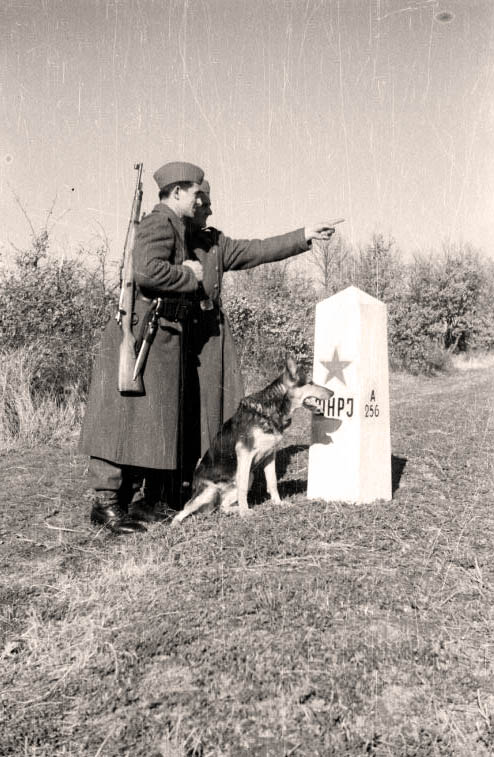
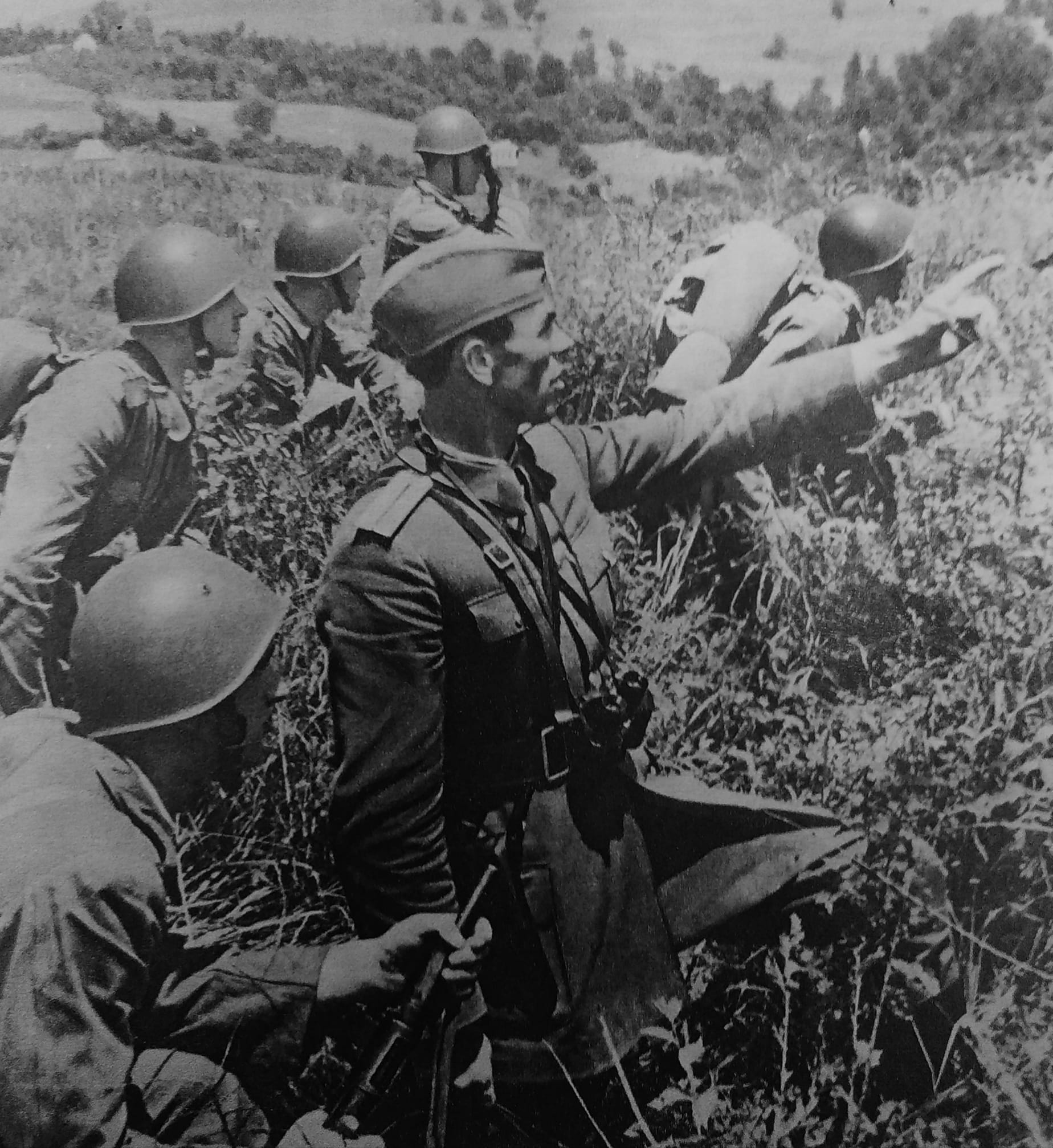
- Yugoslav border guards
Date	June 1948 – December 1954 (6 years and 5 months)
Location	Albanian-Yugoslav border
Result	Pogradec Agreement: Cessation of border clashes; Restoration of border markers
Territorial changes	Border area between Yugoslavia and Albania divided into three sectors

Belligerents
PR Albania	(Socialist Federal Republic of Yugoslavia) FPR Yugoslavia Financial/Military Support: United States

Commanders and leaders
Enver Hoxha; Mehmet Shehu; Kadri Hazbiu	(Socialist Federal Republic of Yugoslavia) Josip Broz Tito (Socialist Federal Republic of Yugoslavia) Koča Popović (Socialist Federal Republic of Yugoslavia) Peko Dapčević (Socialist Federal Republic of Yugoslavia) Aleksandar Ranković

Units involved
Albanian People's Army; Albanian People's Ground Force; Albanian People's Navy; Sigurimi	Yugoslav People's Army; Yugoslav Ground Forces; Yugoslav Navy; Corps of National Defense of Yugoslavia (CNDY); UDBA; (Socialist Federal Republic of Yugoslavia) People's Militia

Strength
4 border battalions (Note: Each of the four border battalions of the Albanian army consisted of around 2,500 soldiers, meaning a total of approximately 10,000 soldiers secured the border); 800 military security services of the Sigurimi.	(Socialist Federal Republic of Yugoslavia) 2 Yugoslav Army divisions (Note: In May 1951, Yugoslav troops were stationed along the Albanian border. Two divisions of the Yugoslav army had recently been transferred to the border area with Albania, one stationed near Titograd (now Podgorica), a motorized division positioned in Skopje, and another between Debar and Ohrid)

Political support
Party of Labour of Albania	League of Communists of Yugoslavia

Casualties and losses
7 Albanian soldiers killed 16 arrested	(Socialist Federal Republic of Yugoslavia) 11–34 Yugoslav soldiers and militiamen killed (Note: The number of fallen soldiers varies, with authors like Marko Miletić and Aleksandar Zivotić claiming that only 11to 12 Yugoslav soldiers were killed. However, other authors like Ivan Laković assert that 18 Yugoslav border soldiers were killed, indicating variations in the reported figures. Additionally, Western author Judith Bell claims there were 12 casualties, while Serbian author Ranko Petković contends that 34 Yugoslav soldiers were killed) (Socialist Federal Republic of Yugoslavia) 18–38 injured (Note: The number of injured soldiers also varies. Marko Miletić claims there were 18 wounded, Aleksandar Zivotić asserts there were 19, and Ivan Laković claims there were 38, indicating discrepancies in the reported figures.) (Socialist Federal Republic of Yugoslavia) 8–15 were kidnapped including UDBA agents

The Albanian–Yugoslav border conflict, was a period of armed confrontations between the armed forces of Albania and Yugoslavia between the years 1948 and 1954. This period of heightened tensions between Albania and Yugoslavia stemmed from territorial disputes and ideological divisions between the Yugoslav Leader Josip Broz Tito and Albanian Leader Enver Hoxha. During the Cold War period, the border between Albania and Yugoslavia became one of the most contentious in the Eastern Bloc.

The conflict also encompassed contentious issues, including the status of Kosovo, with its significant Albanian population. Hoxha's regime regarded Kosovo as part of its historical and ethnic territory, further fueling the tensions between the two nations.

The Sigurimi, Albania's secret police, played a significant role in fomenting separatism in Kosovo and advocating for the idea of a "Greater Albania". The Sigurimi actively supported early planners in exile, working to cultivate support for an independent Kosovo among Albanians in Yugoslavia. It was reported that Hoxha brought Albanian separatists into Yugoslavia to advance his aim of supporting separatism in Kosovo and implementing the Greater Albania project, as asserted by authors and the Yugoslav government.

== Background ==
=== Albanian–Yugoslav relations ===
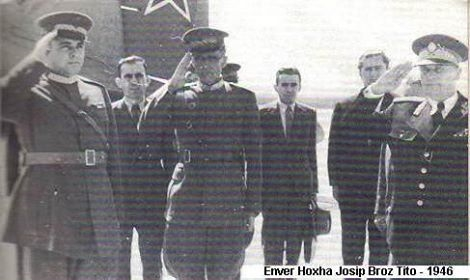
In 1946, a parade in Tirana showcased Enver Hoxha (left), the First Secretary of the Albanian Party of Labour, alongside Yugoslav President Josip Broz Tito (right).

After World War II, Yugoslavia and Albania developed close relations, particularly due to their shared communist ideology and the fight against fascist occupation. Josip Broz Tito, the Yugoslav leader, supported Enver Hoxha and the Communist Party of Albania in resisting Italian and German occupation. However, tensions between the two countries began to emerge shortly after the end of World War II. Different visions of communism and territorial claims were central points of contention. Tito pursued a policy of "Titoism," distancing himself from the Soviet leadership under Stalin, while Hoxha followed a more Stalinist line. These ideological differences led to a rift between the two communist leaders.

Additionally, there were territorial disputes between Yugoslavia and Albania, particularly concerning control over border areas and access to the sea. Albania was concerned about Yugoslav dominance in the region and sought to maintain its independence and sovereignty. This led to conflicts and provocations along the shared border between the two countries.

=== Relations during the Cold War ===
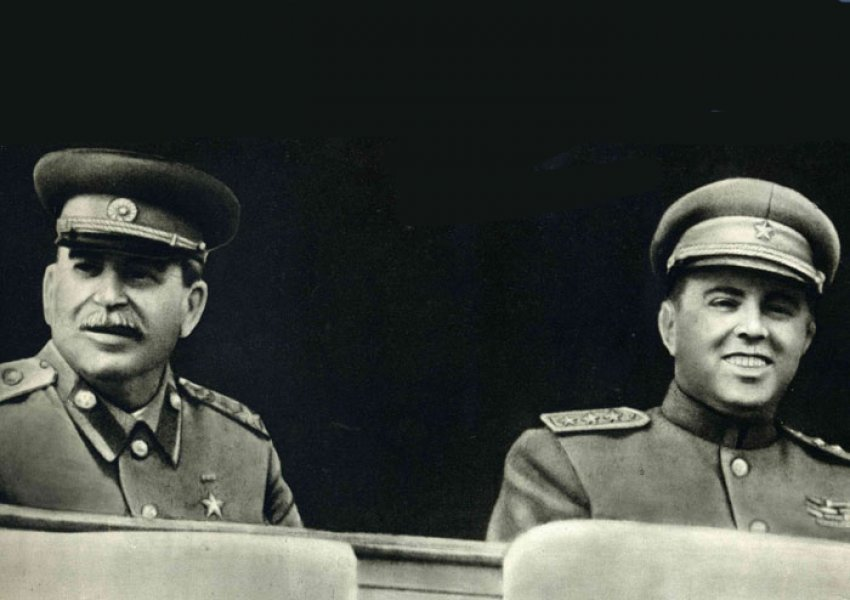
In 1946, Enver Hoxha, the First Secretary of the Party of Labour of Albania, attended the Moscow Victory Parade alongside the Soviet leader Joseph Stalin.

After the split between Stalin and Tito in 1948, Albania, under the leadership of Enver Hoxha, initially turned to the Soviet Union. Albania hoped for Stalin's support to counter Yugoslav influence. Albania joined the anti-Titoist front and supported the Soviet positions against Yugoslavia. However, this alliance with Stalin brought about a dependence on the Soviet Union and resulted in a strong Soviet presence in Albania. Despite the initial alignment with the Soviet Union, Albania later pursued an independent foreign policy, distancing itself from both Soviet and Yugoslav influence. This led to Albania expelling all Yugoslav citizens and military personnel who remained in the country in 1948.

=== Closure of the borders with Yugoslavia ===
In 1948, diplomatic relations between Albania and Yugoslavia were severed following Tito's break with Stalin. This rupture led to the closure of Albania's border with Yugoslavia for over forty years. Albania became the most isolated country in Europe. After the sealing of the border with Yugoslavia, from 1948 to 1953, there were 7,877 border 'incidents', of which 142 were substantive clashes, which led to an armed conflict at the border.

=== Kosovo issue ===
A central issue of the conflict was the status of the Kosovo region. With a significant Albanian population, Kosovo held great historical and ethnic-cultural significance for Albania. Albania viewed Kosovo as an integral part of its territory and supported the independence aspirations of the Albanian population in the region. In contrast, Yugoslavia claimed control over Kosovo and pursued a policy of integration into the Yugoslav state.

== Course of the border conflict ==
=== Start of confrontations ===
On February 19, 1949, Albania accused Yugoslavia of engaging in what it described as "border provocations." Two days later, Yugoslavia countered with allegations of its own, claiming that Albania had fired shots across the border 16 times, detained Yugoslav citizens at the border on 10 occasions, conducted numerous flights over Yugoslav territory, allowed Albanian patrols to cross the border, and even permitted an Albanian naval vessel to enter Yugoslav waters, all since July 1948. It was also reported that a total of 649 frontier incidents occurred during the course of the Border conflict, resulting in 12 deaths. Hoxha's regime was accused of instigating these incidents since 1948. Additionally, Yugoslav officials alleged that the Albanian Minister of the Interior, Mehmet Shehu, was personally in charge of the frontier incidents.

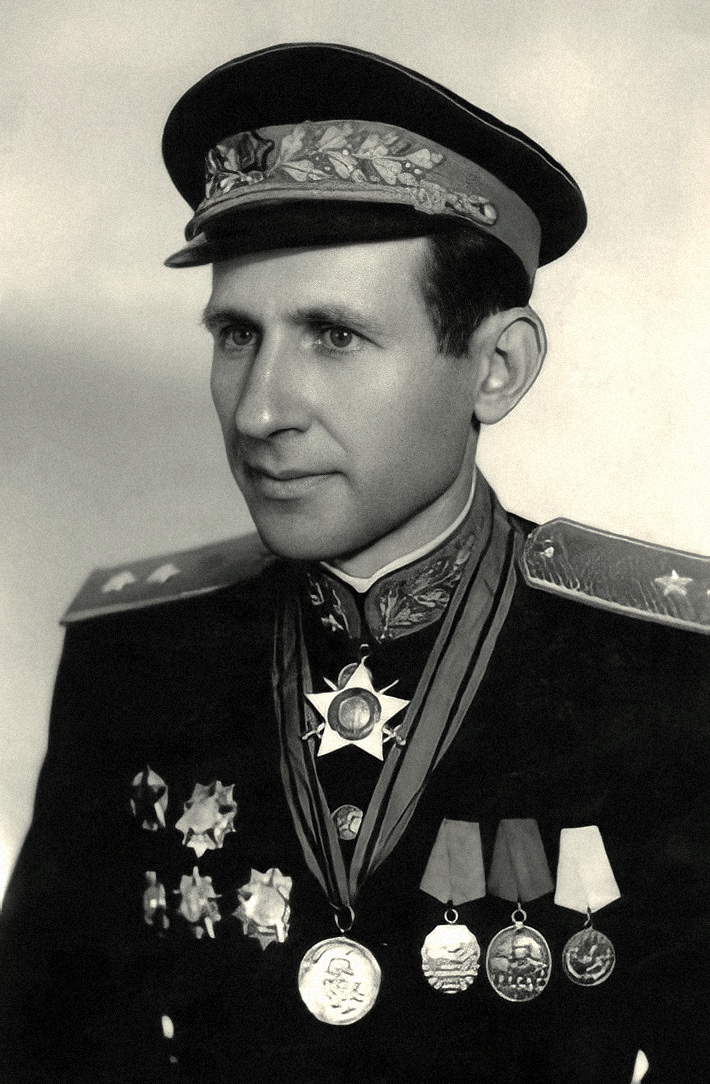
In 1946, Mehmet Shehu as Chief of the General Staff of the Albanian People's Army.

The worst frontier is the Albanian. Yugoslav officials say that the Albanian Minister of the Interior, Mehmet Shehu, was personally in charge of the frontier incidents.

A classified CIA document states that Mehmet Shehu personally ordered the formation and training of the Frontier Guard Commando units. These units were specifically tasked with raiding Yugoslav posts and instructed to shoot Yugoslav military personnel or civilians on sight. It is noted that very few commandos were captured alive by the Yugoslavs, and there have been no cases of desertion. Successful operations are rewarded with decorations, extra rations, and cash awards of up to 1,000 lek.

The armed confrontations between Yugoslavia and Albania began as early as June 1948 with the first documented incidents at the border. On June 25, 1948, soldier Tanasije Krstic was wounded in an incident near the village of Trebište and on October 20, 1948, another incident occurred when soldier Ivan Balesh was wounded near Debar. He was involved in a clash with an unidentified armed group attempting to cross from Albania into Yugoslavia.Hoxha's regime responded to the escalating tensions by concentrating stronger military forces along the border with Yugoslavia. By August 1948, Albania had undertaken a limited mobilization, increasing its military capacity to around 40,000 armed personnel. In response to the Informbiro Resolution, Albania promptly bolstered its deployment of border guards along the Yugoslav border. This reinforcement was particularly evident in July and August 1949 during a reorganization period. During this time, four out of eight Albanian border battalions, comprising approximately 2,500 personnel, were stationed along the Albanian border, resulting in a density of five guards per kilometer. Additionally, about 800 personnel from the Sigurimi (internal security) brigade were deployed to secure the border line.

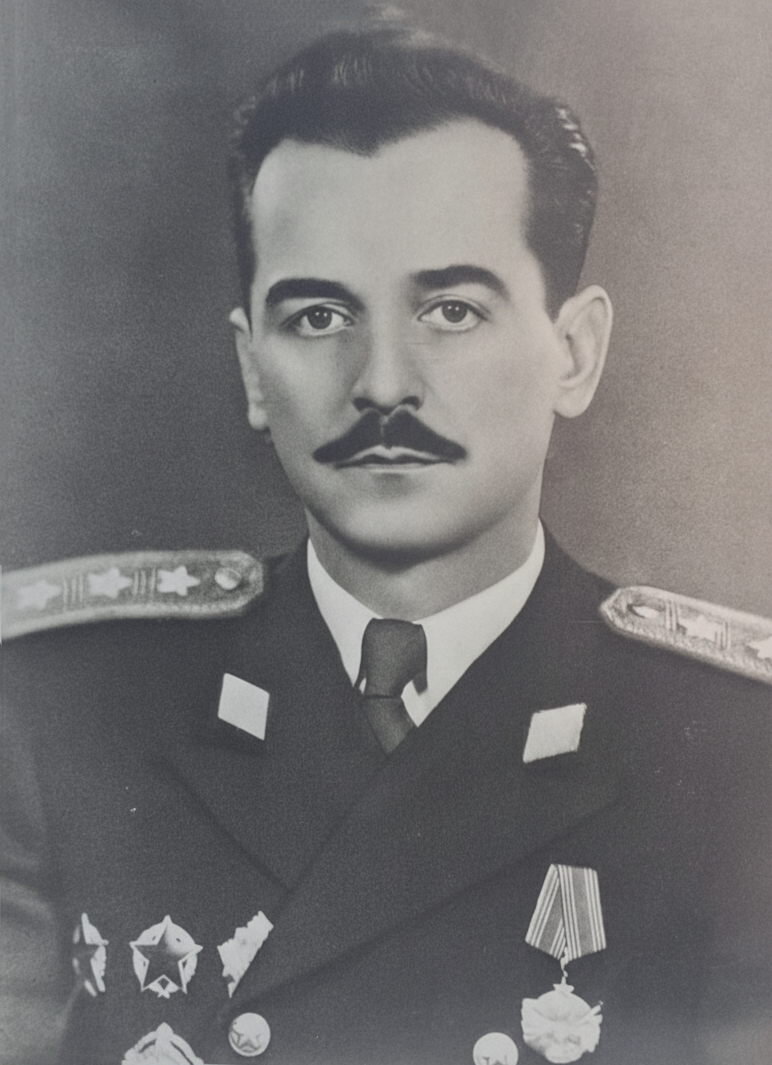
In 1948, the Chief of the General Staff of the Yugoslav People's Army, Koča Popović.

In the following months, violence escalated, with shootings, illegal border crossings, and acts of sabotage becoming commonplace. Conflicts between the border troops of both countries intensified, signaling the beginning of a phase of heightened confrontation between Yugoslavia and Albania. On May 10, 1949, the Yugoslav government reported that Albanian frontier guards shot up a Yugoslav motor boat carrying a lieutenant and three soldiers on Lake Shkodër, killing them. On October 11, 1949, Yugoslav border guard Mitar Vojnović was killed by some Albanian soldiers near the border. The Albanian government was then requested to pay compensation in the amount of 500,000 dinars.

=== High-level armed conflict ===
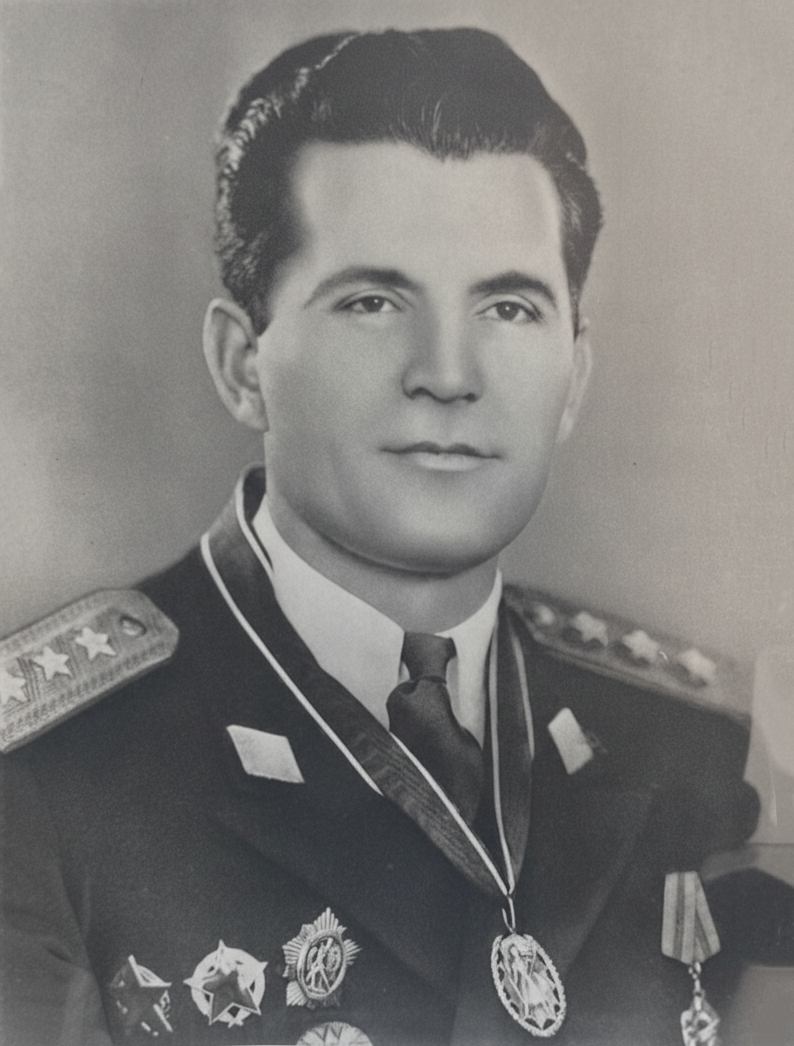
Deputy Chief of the General Staff of the Yugoslav People's Army, Peko Dapčević (from 1953 Chef of the General Staff of the YPA).

In 1951, the armed provocations at the Yugoslav-Albanian border reached their peak. At the beginning of that year, General Peko Dapčević informed Josip Broz Tito that he had received reports that approximately hundred Soviet fighters and bombers had flown from Bulgaria towards Albania that morning. Tito reacted promptly, convening a meeting with Aleksandar Ranković, Edvard Kardelj, Milovan Đilas, Ivan Gošnjak, Koča Popović, and Boris Kidrič. Initially, it seemed that an imminent attack by the Soviets and their satellites on Yugoslavia was looming. However, Tito remained reserved, believing that it was not a sign of an impending Soviet attack but rather suspected that the Soviets were attempting to turn Albanian territory into a strategic position. The conflict further escalated as both countries bolstered their military presence along the border, resulting in a volatile situation characterized by sporadic violence and diplomatic tensions. In May 1951, Yugoslav troops were stationed along the Albanian border. Two divisions of the Yugoslav army had recently been transferred to the border area with Albania, one stationed near Titograd (now Podgorica), a motorized division positioned in Skopje, and another between Debar and Ohrid. Albanian authorities are reported to have been alarmed, resulting in the arrest of more than 150 individuals considered dangerous or suspicious in border areas with Yugoslavia.

=== First Attacks ===
A series of serious incidents occurred at the border. On May 23, shots were fired from some Albanian soldiers at a Yugoslav border patrol near Dragaš, resulting in the death of Yugoslav border guard Hezy Zdrala. Another incident occurred on August 7 in the region of Trnki Gora, where Vladislav Marinkovic was killed from Albanian border guards. Two fatal incidents took place in October 1950: Meho Kamari was injured on October 5 while attempting to stop individuals from illegally crossing into Yugoslavia from Albanian territory, and Milorad Burić was injured on October 12 during an ambush set by Albanian insurgents near the border line. Additionally, Sylvester Vukanović was injured on November 18 during clashes with Albanian border guards who had set up ambushes for Yugoslav patrols.

These incidents led to diplomatic responses between Albania and Yugoslavia. Throughout the year, Yugoslav border authorities prevented 22 attempted illegal crossings from Yugoslav to Albanian territory, mostly involving individuals associated with the Informbiro Resolution or crossing for family reasons. On January 30, young Sergeant Simo Čolić was wounded near Drijenak while attempting to respond to fire from the Albanian side. On May 16, a group of Albanian soldiers infiltrated deep into Yugoslav territory near Blato, laid an ambush, and attacked a Yugoslav border patrol. In the brief fight, soldier Stojan Mitrović was lightly injured. On July 18, a clash occurred near the village of Vusanje between Yugoslav border guards and an infiltrated Albanian diversionary group. In this battle, border policeman Milan Nikolić was killed. The most serious incident occurred on September 2, 1951, near the village of Zhur, when a two-member Yugoslav patrol noticed a group of nine Albanians in civilian and military clothing. The patrol signaled them to stop, but the group began to retreat towards the border, prompting gunfire. Three of them were killed and one Albanian was injured.

Yugoslav Chief of the General Staff Peko Dapčević (left) on an official visit to the US, meeting with US Army Chief of Staff J. Lawton Collins during the height of the border conflict, March 1953.

A group of about 40 Albanian soldiers opened fire on the Yugoslav patrol, allowing the remaining members to retreat to Albanian territory. Soldier Miodrag Stojanović died the same evening from the wounds received, while soldier Miodrag Đuričić was wounded. On the night of August 22–23, near the village of Vlashnjë near Prizren, approximately ten kilometers deep into Yugoslav territory, soldier Petar Rakić was killed in a clash with Albanian guerrillas. In 1951, a United Nations report indicates that west of the village of Gorna Belica in the Struga region, a detachment of fifteen Albanian soldiers laid an ambush at the frontier line for a Yugoslav patrol consisting of three soldiers. All of these Yugoslav soldiers were killed.

In 1952, the number of border incidents gradually declined both in frequency and severity. In the region of the village Sukobina on July 2, a Yugoslav patrol fell into an ambush on Yugoslav territory set by Albanian separatists.After a brief exchange of fire, the Albanian separatists withdrew to their own territory under the cover of machine gun fire. An official protest was lodged by the Albanian government, but neither this nor many previous protests yielded results. During this incident, border guard Slobodan Radosavljević was lightly wounded.

On July 24, shots were fired by some Albanian border guards directly at the Yugoslav patrol stationed at the border line northeast of Andrijevica. Border guard Franz Skrad was seriously injured in the firefight. In the vicinity of the village Žirovnica on August 20, a serious clash occurred between a patrol of the Yugolav border police and a detected Albanian sabotage group. Three militiamen were injured in this fight: Karanfilovski, Ristovski, and Androvski. During the pursuit of the same group on Yugoslav territory on August 22 near the village of Rubnice, militiaman Milivoje Krati was injured.

Following this incident, the Yugoslav Ministry of Foreign Affairs lodged a protest with the Albanian government demanding compensation for the families of the deceased and the injured militiaman, but the Albanian government turned a deaf ear to this demand. In 1952, 13 attempts or attempted attempts by sabotage groups from Albanian territory into Yugoslav territory were registered. It was presumed that the number of detected groups did not cover all intrusions. In nine cases, the sabotage groups suffered no losses in clashes with Yugoslav border guards, while in two cases, one saboteur was killed.

In the vicinity of Vrbnica on August 2, a border patrol fell into an ambush set by Albanian soldiers on Yugoslav territory. Commander of the patrol, with 15 border guards, quickly arrived for assistance. During the ensuing clash, Yugoslav commander Mileta Gavrović was fatally wounded.In the vicinity of Vrbnica on August 2, a border patrol fell into an ambush set by Albanian separatists Dragi Pajuh and Milan Milosavljević. Two major incidents resulting in fatalities occurred that year. In the Decani Mountains, about two kilometers into Yugoslav territory, on July 24, Corporal Boško Žilović was killed in a clash with a detected Albanian sabotage group. Subsequently, the saboteurs, dressed in Albanian uniforms, withdrew to Albanian territory. During the renovation of border markers on July 30, Corporal Momčilo Malčić was killed 25 kilometers from Prizren. In April of the same year, a sabotage group unsuccessfully attempted to cross into Yugoslav territory near Ohrid, with six groups attempting to infiltrate Yugoslavia (three near Debar, two near Shkodër, and one near Peja). In July, four attempts were observed (two near Prizren and one each near Peja and Debar), and in August, four more attempts (two near Prizren and one each near Peja and Debar). In September, there were two attempts near Prizren and one each near Peja and Debar, while in October, two failed attempts were noted (one near Kolašin and one near Prizren).

In 1953, there were 11 cases of smuggling propaganda material, with three cases in Cizmovo in February, two in Cizmovo and two in the vicinity of Prizren in April, and one each in May and October in the vicinity of Prizren. Additionally, there were 18 incidents of violations of territorial waters, 21 cases of shooting at border guards, with 18 on Yugoslav territory, four cases of rocket attacks, 19 detected sabotage groups, three instances of illuminating territory, and two instances of reconnaissance.

In 1953, although the number of incidents decreased, their severity remained palpable. On July 29, near Junik, a Yugoslav patrol fell into an ambush set up by Albanian soldiers on Yugoslav territory. Soon after, the guard commander rushed with 15 soldiers to aid the patrol. In a fierce battle, Soldier Mileta Gavrović was severely injured. On August 2, near Vrbnica, a Yugoslav border patrol laid a trap for an Albanian sabotage group. During this skirmish, Yugoslav soldiers Dragić Rajić and Milan Milosavljević sustained minor injuries. Additionally, two major incidents resulting in fatalities occurred during the year. On June 24, in the mountains near Dečani, approximately two kilometers deep into Yugoslav territory, Sergeant Boško Žilović was killed in a clash with an infiltrated Albanian sabotage group. The infiltrators, trained in Albanian uniforms, retreated to Albanian territory thereafter. On July 30, during the renewal of border markings, 25 kilometers from Priština, Sergeant Momčilo Malčić was killed. In the same year, in April, an unsuccessful attempt by a sabotage group to enter Yugoslav territory near Ohrid was made. In June, six groups attempted incursions into Yugoslavia (three near Debar, two near Shkodra, and one near Peja).

In July, four attempts were made (two near Junik, and one each near Debar and Peja). In August, four more attempts occurred (two near Prizren, and one each near Peja and Debar), followed by two more in September (one each near Prizren and Peja). In October, two unsuccessful attempts were made (one near Kolašin, and one near Prizren). In 1953, 11 cases of smuggling propaganda material from Albania into Yugoslav territory were recorded (five cases via the Cijevna River in February, two via Cijevna and two near Prizren in April, and one each in May and October near Prizren). During the same year, Yugoslav territory was damaged by Albanian sources on 10 occasions, the airspace violated 18 times, border guards fired upon 21 times, the territory targeted in 18 cases, rockets fired four times, 19 sabotage groups infiltrated, the area illuminated three times, and border guards provoked twice.

During Yugoslavia's border conflicts with other neighboring Soviet allied states, Albania caused the most significant provocations and armed confrontations, despite reporting fewer border incidents overall. More than half of the Yugoslav border guards killed or injured during these conflicts fell victim to Albanian provocations, with 11 fatalities and 18 injuries. In total, there were 4,750 incidents on the Hungarian border, 1,761 on the Romanian border, 1,176 on the Bulgarian border, and 574 on the Albanian border.

== Aftermath ==
=== Casualties ===
During the conflict, both sides suffered losses. The Serbian author Aleksandar Zivotić reported that a total of 7 Albanian soldiers were killed and 16 of them were arrested, including 3 officers of the Albanian intelligence service.

The numbers of casualties and wounded on the Yugoslav side vary during the border conflict. According to different authors, such as Marko Miletić and Aleksandar Zivotić, the reported figures for Yugoslav soldiers killed range from 11 to 12. Ivan Laković, on the other hand, claims that 18 Yugoslav border soldiers lost their lives. Additionally, Judith Bell, a Western author, mentions 12 casualties. In terms of injuries, Marko Miletić reports 18 wounded, while Aleksandar Zivotić states there were 19. Ivan Laković, however, claims that 38 Yugoslav soldiers were injured.

=== Peace talks and Agreement ===
The first indication of a shift in political stance occurred when the Albanian government invited the Yugoslav government to discuss specific issues regarding their shared border and the armed clashes. General Dušan Mugoša noted the difficulties in engaging in discussions with the Albanian officer delegates. Despite these challenges, both sides managed to reach an agreement, laying the groundwork for further negotiations and cooperation.

Pogradec Agreement
- Type: Ceasefire agreement
- Signed: 9 December 1953
- Location: Pogradec, Albania
- Effective: December 1954
- Condition: Division of borders into three sectors
- Original signatories: Yugoslavia; Albania
- Signatories: (Socialist Federal Republic of Yugoslavia) Dušan Mugoša (People's Socialist Republic of Albania) Mehmet Shehu
- Languages: Albanian; Serbo-Croatian

This initial dialogue paved the way for subsequent discussions, ultimately leading to the signing of separate agreements in Pogradec on December 9, 1953. These agreements established a joint commission to address border issues, dividing the border into three sectors and regulating it based on a protocol from 1926. The prompt implementation of measures to mark the border line, completed by December 1954, marked a significant step towards resolving territorial disputes and fostering future collaboration. Additionally, it facilitated the withdrawal of Yugoslav troops from the border with Albania.
