= Anti-Slavic sentiment =

Hostility, prejudice, or discrimination against Slavic peoples

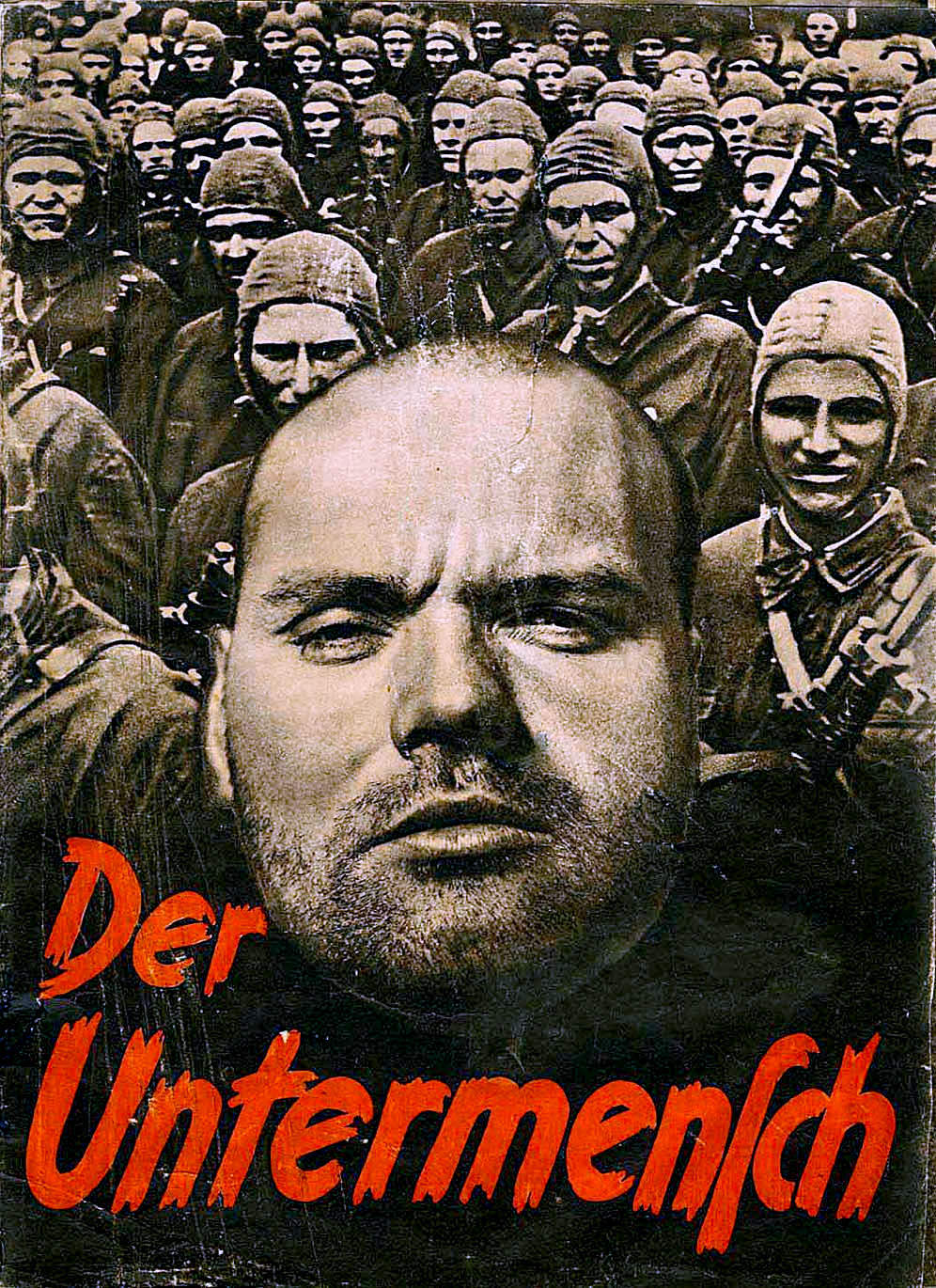
A cover of the SS brochure "Der Untermensch" (lit. The Subhuman), 1942. The booklet portrayed Slavs and various other ethnic groups within Eastern Europe as primitive people.

Anti-Slavic sentiment, also called anti-Slavic racism or Slavophobia, refers to different types of negative attitudes, prejudices, collective hatred or animosity, stereotypes, discrimination, and violence (economic, physical, political, psychological, verbal, etc.) directed at one or more ethnic groups of Slavic peoples. Accompanying racism and xenophobia, the most common manifestation of anti-Slavic sentiment throughout history has been the assertion that some Slavs are inferior to other peoples.

Anti-Slavic sentiment reached its highest point during World War II, when Nazi Germany and its collaborators classified most of the Slavs, especially the Belarusians, Poles, Russians, Serbs, and Ukrainians, as "subhumans" (Untermenschen), murdering millions of them through the Generalplan Ost and Hunger Plan.

Slavophobia also emerged twice in the United States. The first time was during the Progressive Era, when immigrants from Eastern Europe were met with opposition from the dominant class of Western European–origin American citizens, who drew on a mix of Puritanism, Anglo-Saxonism, Teutonism, Social Darwinism, and Eugenics to frame Eastern Europeans as racially inferior, culturally unassimilable, and a threat to national vitality; and again during the Cold War, when the United States became locked in an intensive global rivalry with the Soviet Union.

== By country ==
=== Albania ===
Albanian slavophobia can be found in The Highland Lute by the "Albanian Homer" Gjergj Fishta, who wrote after massacres and expulsions of Albanians by their Slavic neighbours. The Albanian intelligentsia proudly asserted, "We Albanians are the original and autochthonous race of the Balkans. The Slavs are conquerors and immigrants who came but yesterday from Asia."

=== Italy ===
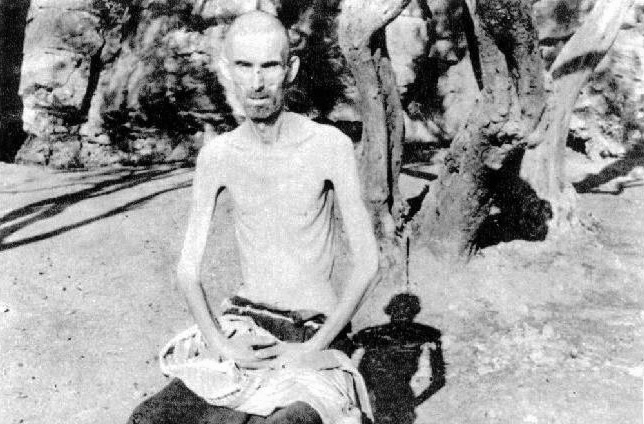
A Slovenian emaciated male inmate suffering from severe malnutrition in the Italian Rab concentration camp on the island of Rab in what is now Croatia. Most of the people who were detained in this camp were Slavs (primarily Croats and Slovenes).

For many Italian irredentists, hatred of Slavs had been strongly pronounced since the beginning of the 20th century, because there were still “unredeemed” territories with Slavic populations under Habsburg rule, that were considered necessary for the formation of the Italian nation-state. Anti-Slav sentiment deepened through the First World War, in which Slavs fought for Austria-Hungary against Italy. The fact that Italy was awarded only parts of Dalmatia at the end of the war also intensified this hostility. In the 1920s, Italian fascists propagated animosity towards people from the neighboring Yugoslavia, especially the Croats, Serbs, and Slovenes. Among others, they fabricated many chauvinistic tropes, for example, claims that the Croats, Serbs, and Slovenes had "atavistic impulses," alongside perpetuating the made-up accusations that the Yugoslavs were conspiring on behalf of "Grand Orient Masonry and its funds." Additionally, some of these prejudices, stereotypes, and racial tropes were connected with anti-semitic conspiracy theories, such the belief that the Serbs were involved in a "social-democratic, masonic Jewish internationalist plot."

The leader of fascist Italy, Benito Mussolini, considered the Slavic race inferior and barbaric. Furthermore, he believed that the Croats posed an existential threat to Italy as they supposedly intended to seize Dalmatia, a region which was claimed by Italy, while he also claimed that the threat rallied Italians at the end of World War I: "The danger of seeing the Yugoslavians settle along the whole Adriatic shore had caused a bringing together in Rome of the cream of our unhappy regions. Students, professors, workmen, citizens—representative men—were entreating the ministers and the professional politicians." These claims often tended to emphasize the "foreignness" of the Yugoslavs by stating that they were newcomers to the area, unlike the ancient Italians, whose territories were occupied by the Slavs.

=== Canada ===
In Canada, many xenophobic white supremacists were deeply tied to their nation's "Anglo-Saxon" culture, especially from the early 1900s to the end of World War II. The Ku Klux Klan in Canada was prominent in the provinces of Saskatchewan and Alberta, both of which have had a relatively high share of Eastern European ethnic population. Consequently, many immigrants from Ukraine, Russia, and Poland were frequently faced with public defamation, acts of harassment, and physical assaults.

Furthermore, during World War I, thousands of Ukrainian Canadians were perceived as "enemy aliens" as Canadian nativists considered their presence as a "threat" to Canada's Western European heritage. Due to this, many of them were interned in concentration camps. What is more, there was constant discrimination towards Ukrainians who recently immigrated from the Austro-Hungarian Empire.

=== Germany ===
==== Middle Ages ====
Though anti-Slavic sentiments reached their peak during Nazi Germany, Germany has had a long history of Slavophobia. Thietmari merseburgensis episcopi chronicon (see: Wikisource), an important chronicle written in the 1010s by Thietmar, Prince-Bishop of Merseburg, contains negative, prejudicial depiction of Slavic people, defined as population living between the rivers Elbe and Oder (Polabians)—although Thietmar recognized that inhabitants of Poland and Bohemia speak "Slavic language", he did not refer to them as Slavs in the ethnic sense. Later, the Germanic people of Prussia often depicted Polish people in a negative light, which paralleled future Slavophobia in the Nazi regime. The Teutonic Order played a foundational role in shaping early German anti-Slavic sentiment through its participation in the Drang nach Osten ("Drive to the East"), a medieval and later nationalistic concept referring to German expansion into Slavic and Baltic lands. Beginning in the 13th century, the order launched crusades against pagan and Slavic populations in the eastern Baltic region, including Prussians, Lithuanians, and Pomeranians, under the pretext of Christianization and a civilizing mission. The conquest and colonization of these territories involved the suppression of native Slavic and Baltic cultures, forced conversions, and the settlement of German colonists. These actions were justified by portraying Slavic peoples as barbaric, morally deficient, and politically inferior, a narrative reinforced by Teutonic chroniclers such as Peter of Dusburg. The order imposed German legal systems and language, contributing to a lasting cultural hierarchy in which German identity was seen as superior.

==== 19th century ====
Nikolay Ulyanov in his 1968 article "Замолчанный Маркс" (Hushed-up Marx) provides ample evidence of anti-Slavism by the founders of Marxism, Karl Marx and Friedrich Engels. For example, in his 1849 article "The Magyar Struggle," Engels wrote that the Slavs living in the Austrian Empire were "barbarians" who "needed to be saved" by the German Austrians, and predicted that a future revolutionary upheaval would enable the "Austrian Germans and Magyars" to "wreak a bloody revenge on the Slav barbarians." He described German Austrians and Magyars (Hungarians) as progressive forces acting as a “wedge” driven between the Slavic groups—namely the Czechs, Slovaks, South Slavs, and Ruthenians—and argued that the German nobility "in Bohemia, Moravia, Carinthia and Kraina" had "Germanised them and so drew them into the European movement", while the "Magyar nobility likewise" ruled, "in Croatia, Slavonia and the Carpathian territories."

Gustav Freytag's 1855 novel Soll und Haben ("Debt and Credit") was one of the most-read German novels of the 19th century, and contained antisemitic sentiments as well as depictions of Poles as incompetent.

Polish people in the Prussian Partition (territories that belonged to the Polish–Lithuanian Commonwealth before 1772, but became part of the Kingdom of Prussia — and, later, German Empire — following the Partitions) were discriminated against in multiple ways. For example, Michał Drzymała was prohibited from building a house on his own land by the Prussian authorities because of his ethnicity (there was legislation intended to restrict Polish settlement in the Prussian eastern provinces). Another famous anti-Polish actions of Germans are activities of the German Eastern Marches Society, events that led to the Września children's strike and other ways of Germanisation.

==== Nazi Germany ====
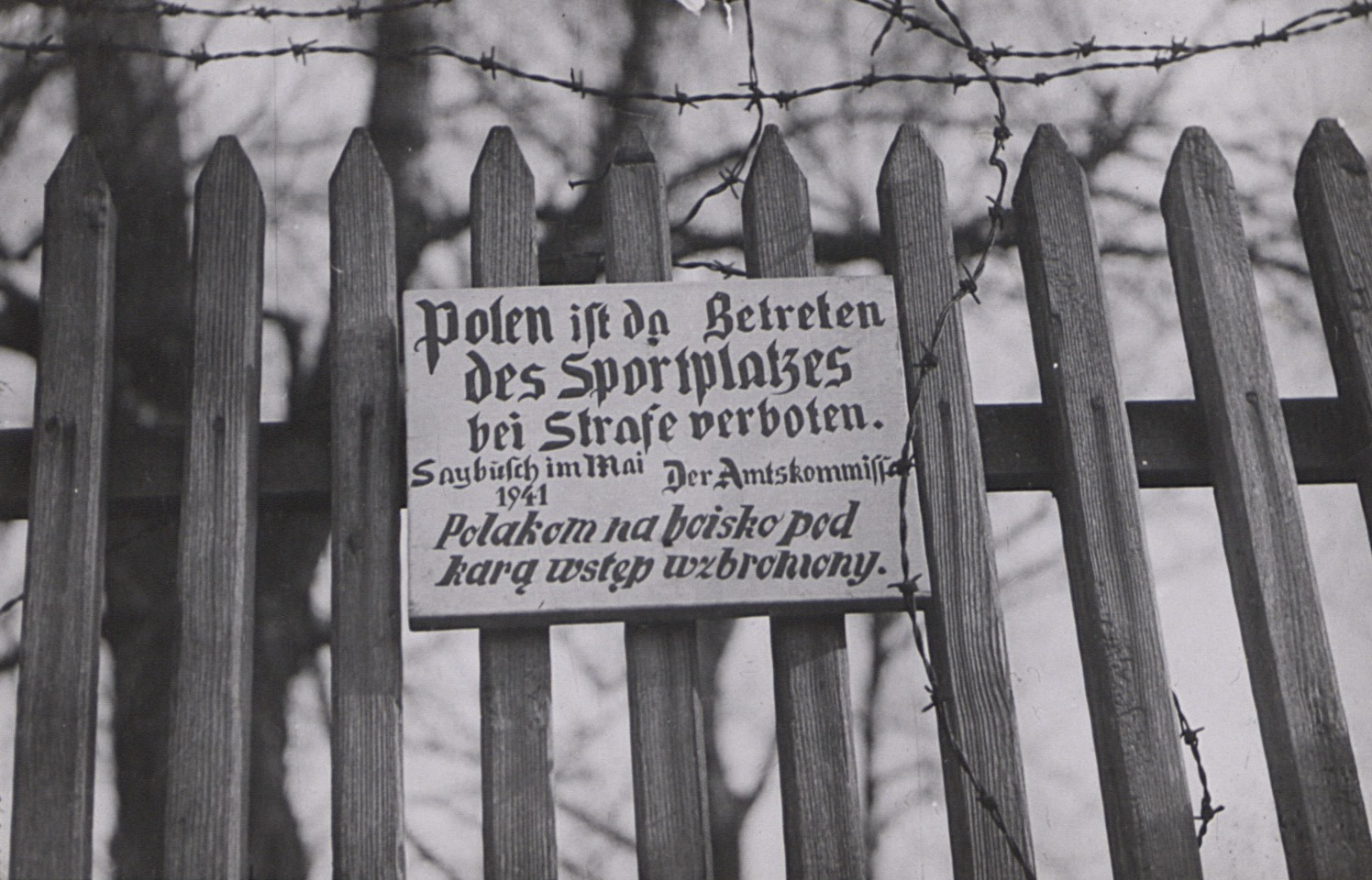
A sign in Nazi-occupied Poland that reads "Entry to the field is forbidden for Poles under penalty"

Anti-Slavic racism played a significant role within the ideology of Nazism. Adolf Hitler and the Nazi Party held the belief that Slavic countries - particularly Poland, the Soviet Union, and Yugoslavia, as well as their respective peoples - were "Untermenschen" (subhumans). According to their viewpoint, these Slavic nations were deemed to be foreign entities and were not considered part of the Aryan master race. Nazi Germany depicted the Soviet Union as an "Asiatic enemy" of Europeans, in addition to portraying its population as inferior subhumans controlled by Jews and communists.

Hitler’s autobiography, Mein Kampf, expressed anti-Slavic views. Among others, he wrote: “One ought to cast the utmost doubt on the state-building power of the Slavs,” and from the beginning, he rejected the idea of incorporating the Slavs into Greater Germany.

Hitler considered the Slavs to be racially inferior, because, in his view, the Bolshevik Revolution had put the Jews in power over the mass of Slavs, who were, by his own definition, incapable of ruling themselves but were instead being ruled by Jewish masters. He considered the development of modern Russia to have been the work of Germanic, not Slavic, elements in the nation, but believed those achievements had been undone and destroyed by the October Revolution, in Mein Kampf, he wrote, “The organization of a Russian state formation was not the result of the political abilities of the Slavs in Russia, but only a wonderful example of the state-forming efficacity of the German element in an inferior race.” Heinrich Himmler and the SS in particular interpreted the medieval conflicts between feudal rulers of German, Polish, and Russian-speaking lands as a "racial struggle" of the Germanic peoples against the Slavs. Himmler regarded himself as the reincarnation of the Saxon king Henry the Fowler, who had been victorious against the Slavs. This interpretation influenced Germany's war planning and conduct during World War II in Eastern Europe. A few days before the invasion of Poland, Hitler declared in a speech before military commanders:

The objective is the elimination of the living forces. In the initiation and conduct of war, what matters is not right, but victory ... brutal action, utmost severity.

Following the German conquest, members of the Polish intelligentsia were murdered by Einsatzgruppen of the SD under the command of Reinhard Heydrich. Poles deemed "incapable of Germanization" were deported to the General Government, where they were intended to serve as migrant labourers for the German authorities. Prior to the invasion of the Soviet Union, the Decree on the Exercise of Military Jurisdiction in the Barbarossa Area of 13 May 1941 authorized collective reprisals against the civilian population, while the Commissar Order directed that captured political officers of the Red Army were to be executed immediately. Newsreels also displayed images of Russians whom many contemporary Germans perceived as "ugly, underdeveloped ... faces like apes, with enormous noses, ragged, dirty".

Because, according to the Nazis, the German people needed more territory to sustain its surplus population, an ideology of conquest and depopulation was formulated for Central and Eastern Europe according to the principle of Lebensraum, itself based on an older theme in German nationalism which maintained that Germany had a "natural yearning" to expand its borders eastward (Drang Nach Osten). The Nazis' policy towards Slavs was to exterminate or enslave the vast majority of the Slavic population and repopulate their lands with millions of ethnic Germans and other Germanic peoples. According to the resulting genocidal Generalplan Ost, millions of German and other "Germanic" settlers would be moved into the conquered territories, and the original Slavic inhabitants were to be annihilated, removed, or enslaved. The policy was focused especially on the Soviet Union, as it alone was deemed capable of providing enough territory to accomplish this goal.

"Hitler gave the already existing ideas of anti-Semitism, anti-Bolshevism, and anti-Slavism the form of a genocidal alternative: either we survive or the Jews, Bolsheviks, Slavs – the people of the East – do. Based on theories of a racial hierarchy, he built the directives for an extermination programme aimed at part of the population of Europe and Asia and the creation of a Teutonic “New Order”. ... The concept of Nazi Lebensraum cannot be fully explained without bluntly stating an important motivational element of his conquests in the East: anti-Slavism."

— Polish historian Jerzy Wojciech Borejsza

As part of the Generalplan Ost, Nazi Germany developed the Hunger Plan, a forced starvation programme which involved the seizure of all of the food that was produced in Eastern European lands and the delivery of it to Germany, primarily to the German army. The full implementation of this plan would have ultimately resulted in the starvation and death of 20 to 30 million people (mainly Russians, Belarusians, and Ukrainians). It is estimated that in accordance with this plan, over four million Soviet citizens were starved to death from 1941 to 1944. The resettlement policy reached a much more advanced stage in occupied Poland because of its immediate proximity to Germany.

For strategic reasons, the Nazis deviated from some of their ideological theories by forging alliances with the Independent State of Croatia, the Slovak State, and Bulgaria. Yugoslav general Milan Nedić would also lead Nazi Germany's Serbian puppet government. The Nazis officially justified these alliances by stating that the Croats were "more Germanic than Slav," a notion which was propagated by Croatia's leader Ante Pavelić, who espoused the view that the "Croats were the descendants of the ancient Goths" who "had the pan-Slavic idea forced upon them as something artificial". Hitler also believed that the Bulgarians were "Turkoman", while the Czechs and Slovaks were Mongolians in their origins. After conquering Yugoslavia, attention was instead focused on targeting mainly the nation's Jewish and Roma (Gypsy) population.

=== Greece ===
Traditionally, in Greece, Slavic people were considered "invaders who separated the glory of Greek Antiquity, by bringing an era of decline and ruin to Greece – the Dark Ages." In 1913, after the First and Second Balkan wars, when Greece took control of Slavic-inhabited areas in Northern Greece, the Slavic toponyms were changed to Greek, and according to the Greek government, this was "the elimination of all the names which pollute and disfigure the beautiful appearance of our fatherland."

After the Tarlis incident in which 17 Bulgarian peasants were killed by a Greek soldier on July 27, 1924, near the Greco-Bulgarian border, tensions between the two countries increased. As a result, on 29 September 1924 a protocol was signed at the League of Nations in Geneva, concerning the "Protection of the Bulgarian minority in Greece". The protocol obliged Greece to treat all members of this minority according to the terms of the Treaty of Sèvres. Meanwhile, in Greece, internal reaction against the Protocol arose because public opinion stood against the recognition of any "Bulgarian" minority. On February 2, 1925, the Greek Parliament, refused to ratify the agreement.

Anti-Slavic sentiment escalated during the Greek Civil War, when Macedonian partisans, who aligned themselves with the Democratic Army of Greece, were not treated as equals and suffered discrimination everywhere, they were accused of committing a "sin" because they chose to identify themselves as Slavs rather than Greeks. The Macedonian partisans were subjected to threats of extermination, physical attacks, murder, attacks on their settlements, forcible expulsions, restrictions on freedom of movement, and bureaucratic problems, among other discriminatory acts. Although they were allied with the Greek Left, due to their Slavic identity, the Macedonians were viewed with suspicion and animosity by the Greek Left.

In 1948, the Democratic Army of Greece evacuated tens of thousands of child refugees, both Greek and Slavic in origin. In 1985, the refugees were allowed to re-enter Greece, claim Greek citizenship, and reclaim property, but only if they were "Greek by genus", thus prohibiting those with a Slavic identity from obtaining Greek citizenship, entering Greece, and claiming property.

Today, the Greek state does not recognize its ethnic Macedonian and other Slavic minorities, claiming that they do not exist, with Greece therefore having the right not to grant them any of the rights that are guaranteed to them by human-rights treaties.

=== United States ===
The United States of America has a long history of Slavophobia. Slavophobia began in earnest during the "second wave" of European immigration in the early 1900s, when many people from Southern and Eastern Europe were immigrating to the US. They faced opposition from the "old" immigrants, who were mostly from Northern and Western Europe. These attitudes culminated in the Immigration Act of 1924, which established quotas for and limited the numbers of people from Southern and Eastern European countries who were allowed to enter the US. Slavic peoples were considered to be people of an "inferior race" who were unable to assimilate into American society. They were popularly not considered to be "fully white" (and thus fully American), and Slavic peoples' "whiteness" continues to be a debate to this day.

Slavophobia in the US ramped up again during the Cold War, when Slavic peoples of all nationalities were considered enemies due to the United States' distrust of the Soviet Union. War in the Balkans (which America often had a part in) was considered inevitable due to the Balkan peoples' "propensity for extreme war violence." The United States government, while claiming to advocate for national determination for small countries, has denied national determination to many of the countries in Eastern Europe and the Balkans. As a result, many Slavic people in the US and Western countries felt pressure (and continue to feel pressure) to Anglicize their surnames and downplay their Slavic culture. For example, as shown in the film The Founder, Czech-American Ray Kroc stubbornly insisted on seizing control of the McDonald's brand from the McDonald brothers, when he could have easily stolen their system and built his own company. He recognized that the real value of the company was in its name; people were less likely to eat at a restaurant called "Kroc's".

In American pop culture, Slavic people (specifically Russians) are usually portrayed as either nefarious, violent criminals or as unintelligent, oblivious comic relief. "Dumb Pole" jokes or "Polish jokes" (derogatory jokes towards Polish people) are just one manifestation of anti-Polish sentiment in America, and can be found in all sorts of media from many time periods.

== See also ==
- Anti-Catholicism
- Anti-Croat sentiment
- Anti-Polish sentiment
- Anti-Russian sentiment
- Anti-Serbian sentiment
- Anti-Ukrainian sentiment
- Expulsion of Yugoslavs from Albania (1948–1954)
- Final Solution of the Czech Question
- Pan-Slavism
- Persecution of Eastern Orthodox Christians
- Refugees of the Greek Civil War
- Slavic speakers of Greek Macedonia
- Zamość Uprising
- Slavophilia
