= Kim Youn Bae =

Korean poet

Kim Youn Bae (Korean: 김윤배; born 1944) is a Korean poet. Since his debut in 1986, he has consistently written in a variety of genres, including lyrical, serial, and epic poems. His lyrical poems show his affection and respect for the lives of ordinary people, and his serial and epic poems exhibit his sense of responsibility to record history with the people as its protagonists.

== Life ==
Kim was born in 1944 in Cheongju, Chungcheongbuk-do. He made his debut through the literary journal World Literature in 1986. For 30 years, he worked at a local elementary school as a teacher and continued to write at the same time. After the publication of his first poetry collection Gyeoul supeseo (겨울 숲에서, In Winter Forest) in 1986, he persistently wrote and crossed many genres, such as poetry, criticism, children's story, and prose. After 2004, he began to especially focus on writing epic poetry whose main characters are the people in history. Since he retired from teaching in 2006, he has continued to write in his workroom and literature hall Mipyeong Literature Hall Sigyeongjae, located in Anseong.

== Writing ==
Kim's poetry conveys his respect for the lives of individuals but also his sense of responsibility for the history of the people. Above all, he has been highly acclaimed for his serial poems that show his interest in history, in the Korean literary world where not many of them have been published.

=== Ddeodoriui norae (떠돌이의 노래, Songs of Tramps) ===
Kim's poetry collection Ddeodoriui norae, subtitled Yurang gwandae (유랑광대, Vagabond Clown), was published in 1990 and consists of 60 serial poems about sadangpae, a group of traveling entertainers who were active in the late Joseon period. He incorporated into his poems the style of Korean traditional folk songs, which goes well with the main subject. Sadangpae symbolizes the lives alienated from the modern capitalist civilization, implying the Koreans living in the midst of drastic modernization and industrialization are also wanderers, not so different from the traveling entertainers.

=== Sadang Baudeogi (사당 바우덕이, Vagabond Clown Baudeogi) ===
The poetry collection Sadang Baudeogi is made up of epic poems that reconstitute the life of the real person in history called Baudeogi, who was a famous traveling entertainer of the late Joseon. Its verses with dynamic rhythm and its style inspired from madanggeuk, a traditional Korean performance, effectively embody the life of the protagonist. Just like the protagonists of other pre-existing epic poems featuring the people, she is a typical, ordinary commoner, other than her unique quality of being an entertainer who is excellent at singing, dancing, and tightrope. She is a modern woman who improves her life by herself despite the feudal caste system and gender inequalities of the Joseon period, but also a nomad who shows the world her talents as an entertainer.

=== Siberia-ui chimmuk (시베리아의 침묵, Silence of Siberia) ===
The main characters of his second long poetry collection Siberia-ui chimmuk are also real people in history. They are the two hundred thousand Koreans who moved to the Maritime Province of Siberia to escape the Japanese colonization, and the book deals with the hardships they experienced during the migration to Central Asia in 1937 forced by Stalin's administration. The poet followed their travel route for about a month and listened to the stories recounted by Ekaterina and Victor, which he uses as the motif for the poem.

== Major works ==
=== Poetry collections ===
《겨울 숲에서》, 열음사, 1986 / Gyeoul supeseo (In Winter Forest), Yeoreumsa, 1986

《떠돌이의 노래》, 창작과비평사, 1990 / Ddeodoriui norae (Songs of Tramps), Changbi, 1990

《강 깊은 당신 편지》, 문학과지성사, 1991 / Gang gipeun dangsin pyeonji (Your Letter, Deep in the River), Moonji, 1991

《굴욕은 아름답다》, 문학과지성사, 1994 / Guryogeun areumdapda (Humiliation Is Beautiful), Moonji, 1994

《따뜻한 말 속에 욕망이 숨어 있다》, 문학과지성사, 1997 / Ddaddeuthan mal soge yokmang-i sumeo itda (Desire hides in Warm Words), Moonji, 1997

《슬프도록 비천하고 슬프도록 당당한》, 세계사, 1999 / Seulpeudorok bicheonhago seulpeudorok dangdanghan (So Lowly That It's Sad, So Unapologetic That It's Sad), Segyesa, 1999

《부론에서 길을 잃다》, 문학과지성사, 2001 / Buroneseo gireul ilta (Lost in a Hollow Discussion), Moonji, 2001

《사당 바우덕이》, 문학과지성사, 2004 / Sadang Baudeogi (Vagabond Clown Baudeogi), Moonji, 2004

《혹독한 기다림 위에 있다》, 문학과지성사, 2007 / Hokdokhan gidarim wi-e itda (It Lies on a Harsh Waiting), Moonji, 2007

《바람의 등을 보았다》, 창작과비평사, 2012 / Baramui deung-eul boatda (I Saw the Back of the Wind), Changbi, 2012

《시베리아의 침묵》, 문학과지성사, 2013 / Siberia-ui chimmuk (Silence of Siberia), Moonji, 2013

=== Study ===
《온 몸의 시학 김수영》, 국학자료원, 2003 / On momui sihak kim su-young (The Poetics of the Body, Kim Su-Young), Kookhak, 2003

=== Children's stories ===
《비를 부르는 소년》, 산하, 2001 / Bireul bureuneun sonyeon (The Boy Makes It Rain), Sanha, 2001

《두노야, 힘내》, 네버엔딩스토리, 2010 / Dunoya, himnae (Cheer up, Duno), Never Ending Story, 2010

=== Prose collections ===
《시인들의 풍경》, 문학과지성사, 2000 / Si-in deurui punggyeong (Landscape of Poets), Moonji, 2000

《최울가는 울보가 아니다》, 작가, 2004 / Cheo ulga neun ulboga anida (Cheo Ulga Is Not a Crybaby), Jakga, 2004

== Translation ==
English, Poems by 50 Korean Potets, A GALAXY OF WHALE POEMS, Munhaksasang, Inc, 2005, translated by Kim Seong-Kon and Alec Gordon

== See also ==
"Poet Kim Youn Bae's Website," accessed November 27, 2019, http://www.kimyounbae.com

"Forced Migration of Korean Residents in Russia," Encyclopedia of Korean Culture, accessed November 27, 2019, https://terms.naver.com/entry.nhn?docId=3327186&cid=46623&categoryId=46623

"Korean Cooperative, Support Center for Goryeoin in Gwangju Metropolitan City," accessed November 27, 2019, http://www.koreancoop.com/
