= Sōshi-kaimei =

1939, 1940 Japanese regulations on names in Korea

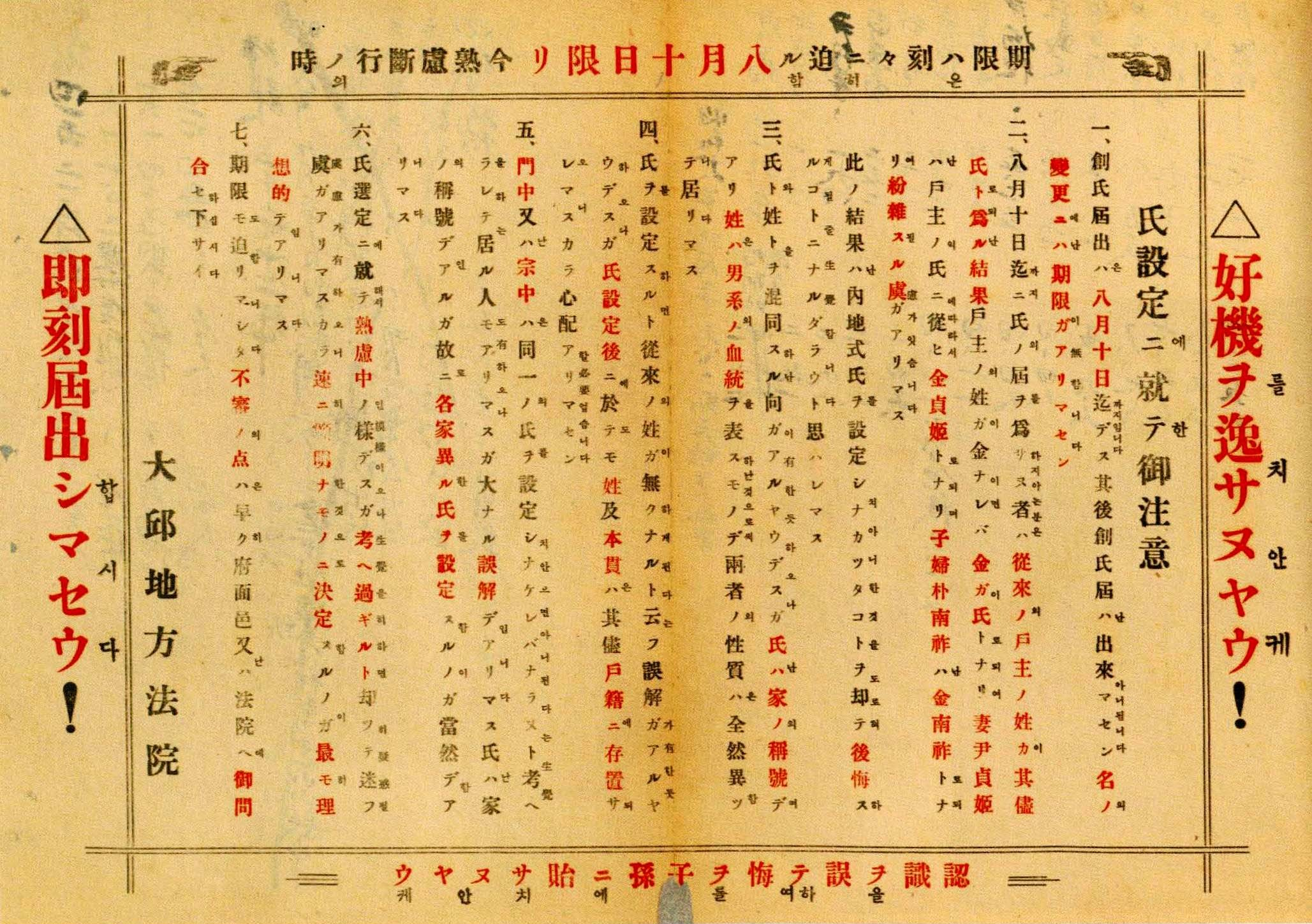
- Announcement of the sōshi-kaimei policy issued by the Taikyu court, written bilingually in Japanese and Korean, in a special parallel style in which hanja/kanji were printed only once and were "shared" by the hangul and kana texts

Korean name
- Hangul: 창씨개명
- Hanja: 創氏改名
- Lit.: Create a surname (shi) and change (your) given name
- RR: changssigaemyeong
- MR: ch'angssigaemyŏng

Sōshi-kaimei (Japanese: 創氏改名; Korean: 일본식 성명 강요, 창씨개명; RR: ilbeunsik seongmyeong gang'yo, changssigaemyeong) was a policy of pressuring Koreans under Japanese rule to adopt Japanese names and identify as such. The primary reason for the policy was to forcibly assimilate Koreans, as was done with the Ainu and the Ryukyuans. The sōshi-kaimei has been deemed by historians as one of the many aspects of cultural genocide that the Japanese attempted to impose on their non-Japanese territories.

It consisted of two parts. The first was the 1939 Ordinance No. 19, which required sōshi, literally "creation of a family name" (氏, shi); see bon-gwan. The second was the 1940 Ordinance No. 20, which permitted kaimei (change of one's given name). These ordinances, issued by Governor-General Jirō Minami, effectively reversed an earlier government order which forbade Koreans to take up Japanese names.

== Order No. 124 ==
In 1909, the Korean Empire established a civil registration law, starting the creation of a modern family registry system. With regard to the recording of details about women such as the father's surname, age, and connection to the registry holder, due to attention that needed to be given to avoiding conflict with Korean customs, the drafting of the law was not completed until April 1910, just before the annexation of Korea. By that time, a portion of Koreans had already registered Japanese-style names and the like, which generated confusion. As a result, on the basis of memoranda such as Order No. 124, "Document regarding name changes by Koreans" issued by the Governor-General of Korea on November 11, 1911, the use by Koreans of "names which might be mistaken for those of native Japanese" was no longer permitted, and strict controls were placed on the registration of Japanese-style names for newborn children. Additionally, Koreans who had registered Japanese-style names there were required to revert to their original names.

== Ordinances No. 19 and 20 ==
In 1939 and 1940, a new name-change policy came into effect by means of Ordinances No. 19 and 20. Originally, as in Taiwan, the new name-change policy was intended simply to allow change of surname (sei/seong) and given name, but because Korea had a long-established custom (recently abandoned) whereby people of the same bon-gwan (surname and clan) were not allowed to marry each other, in order that this custom could continue, it was decided that the policy would be implemented by leaving the clan name and sei the same in the family register while permitting a new family name (shi/ssi) to be registered. On the other hand, in Taiwan, which was also under Japanese rule in the same period, but did not have an analogous custom, the policy was not described as the "creation of a shi", but was simply "change of sei and na (family and given names)" (改姓名).

With regard to the creation of a family name (shi), there were both "shi created by (individual) selection" (設定創氏) and "shi created by law" (法定創氏). In the half-year between February 11 and August 10, 1940, those who provided notification could create a shi of their own choosing, while those who did not provide any notification would have their shi defined by the clan name (sei) of the head of the household. After the "creation of a family name", a Korean had three names which are a family name shi, a clan name sei, and a personal name mei (first name), all of which are recorded in a person's family register along with the origin place of the clan, bon-gwan. Since all members of a family share the same family name shi, the wife's shi, and hence the first character in her legal name, would be the same as her husband's, which differed from the traditional Korean clan name sei, whereby a wife kept her original sei even after marriage (see table). Besides that, selection of a shi with a Japanese-style reading could also be approved; to go along with such a shi, it was also permissible to change one's given name to a Japanese-style name; as the change of given name was voluntary, a fee would be charged for it. Additionally, at the same time, the mukoyōshi system, i.e. an adoption of a daughter's husband (婿養子制度), which up until then had been forbidden under Korean law, was also introduced. This case was also included in the sōshi-kaimei policy.

Declaration of individually selected shi and changes of given name initially (in February 1940) were conducted on the basis of voluntary notification. However, at the April prefectural governors' meeting, because of instructions such as "Special consideration should be taken so that the shi registration of all households can be completed by the coming July 20" the administration began to seriously promote the policy, and as a result, starting from April, the number of households registering individually selected shi began to rise sharply. As of April, only 3.9% of all households had provided notification for the creation of a shi, but by August 10, that figure had risen to 80.3%. Also, statements opposing the policy of sōshi-kaimei were censored according to the internal security laws.

There are several viewpoints regarding this sudden increase. Most argue that official compulsion and harassment existed against individuals who would not create a new Japanese-style shi, but disagree whether this was the result of individual unauthorized practices by low-level officials, the policy of some regional government organizations, or an overall intention of the colonial government. Others argue that Koreans seeking to avoid discrimination by the Japanese voluntarily created Japanese-style family names.

Regardless, of Koreans living in Korea, the proportion of those who changed their given name reached only 9.6%. Among Koreans living in mainland of Japan, the proportion of those who created a new shi by individual selection reached 14.2%.

== Disadvantages if refused/opted out ==
Refusal to comply with, rejecting, or opting out of sōshi-kaimei typically came with negative consequences. Such consequences included the following:

=== Employment ===
Koreans refusing to comply with sōshi-kaimei were usually dismissed as a result with no other reason given. However, retention of employment or reinstatement (for those dismissed) was a possibility if Koreans complied with sōshi-kaimei.

Workplaces usually prohibited employment of Koreans who rejected sōshi-kaimei, and those Koreans who remained employed but refused sōshi-kaimei were typically punished severely under the auspices of the Japanese Government-General.

Koreans refusing to comply with sōshi-kaimei also had their salaries cut/reduced or withheld entirely prior to being threatened with penalties and dismissal.

=== Education ===
Korean faculty and staff at all levels of education were obligated to change their names under sōshi-kaimei, and Korean principals and teachers were required to pressure their Korean students into changing their names. Faculty and staff who refused to comply were dismissed. Students who refused to comply were typically suspended, threatened with penalties and expulsion, and expelled. If an entire school or a department within that school was non-compliant, the school was closed.

Korean students who used Korean names on documents after the sōshi-kaimei edict were punished and the school's faculty and staff penalized. Korean students, faculty, and staff also had their families threatened with punishment for refusing to comply.

=== Healthcare and public services ===
Koreans who rejected/did not comply with sōshi-kaimei were usually refused treatment in hospitals and those Koreans who received treatment had to be recorded under a Japanese name in charts and other medical records.

Newborn Koreans were required to be registered under a Japanese name.

Physicians, nurses, and other medical staff were required to obey the sōshi-kaimei edict as applicable to patients; hospitals and clinics that refused to do so were closed.

Koreans who rejected/did not comply with sōshi-kaimei were also excluded from other public services such as welfare.

== Restoration of original names ==
- Name Restoration Order
- Hangul: 조선 성명 복구령
- Hanja: 朝鮮姓名復舊令
- RR: Joseon seongmyeong bokguryeong
- MR: Chosŏn sŏngmyŏng pokkuryŏng

After the liberation of Korea from Japanese rule, the Name Restoration Order was issued on October 23, 1946, by the United States military administration south of the 38th parallel, enabling Koreans to restore their Korean names if they wished to. However, not all Koreans returned to using their original names, especially Koreans living outside of Korea. Many Zainichi Koreans chose to retain their Japanese names, either to avoid discrimination, or later, to meet the requirements for naturalization as Japanese citizens, while some Sakhalin Koreans who had taken Japanese names were registered by Soviet authorities under those names (which appeared on their Japanese identity papers) after the Red Army liberated South Sakhalin, and up to the present day have been unable to revert their legal names to their original Korean ones.

== Name registration of prominent individuals ==
=== Those who took or were given a Japanese-style name ===
- Kim Suk-won (金錫源), a.k.a. Kaneyama Shakugen (金山錫源), Major General in the Imperial Japanese Army
- Park Chung-hee (朴正熙), a.k.a. Takagi Masao (高木正雄), Lieutenant in the army of Manchukuo, later president of South Korea
- Lee Myung-bak (李明博), a.k.a. Tsukiyama Akihiro (月山明博), former president of South Korea
- Kim Dae-jung (金大中), a.k.a. Toyota Daiju (豊田大中), former president of South Korea

=== Those who retained their Korean-style name ===
- Hong Sa-ik (洪思翊), Lieutenant General in the Imperial Japanese Army
- Pak Chun-geum (朴春琴), member of the House of Representatives (see Japanese Wikipedia article)
- Han Sang-ryong (韓相龍), member of the House of Peers (see Korean Wikipedia article)
- Yi Gi-yong (李埼鎔), member of the House of Peers

== Timeline of family registration procedures in Korea ==
Year	Individual	Clan name; bon-gwan (本貫) and seong (姓)	Family name; ssi (氏)	First name; mei (名)	Full name/record
Prior to 1909: Recording in family register (族譜) (The family register was typically managed by the head of the clan; however, some citizens did not have a Seong)	Husband	Gimhae Kim (金海金)	None	Mu-Hyeon (武鉉)	Kim Mu-Hyeon (金武鉉)
Prior to 1909: Recording in family register (族譜) (The family register was typically managed by the head of the clan; however, some citizens did not have a Seong)	Wife	Gyeongju Yi (慶州李)	None	None	No record, as the woman's name was not recorded in the register (族譜)
1910 to 1940: Minseki law system (民籍法制定)	Husband	Gimhae Kim (金海金)	None	Mu-Hyeon (武鉉)	Seong and given name Kim Mu-Hyeon (金武鉉)
1910 to 1940: Minseki law system (民籍法制定)	Wife	Gyeongju Yi (慶州李)	None	Mu-a (撫兒)	Seong and given name Yi Mu-a (李撫兒)
1940 to 1945: sōshi-kaimei (the legal name, which used to be seong and given name, becomes ssi and given name)	In the case of a ssi created by law				
1940 to 1945: sōshi-kaimei (the legal name, which used to be seong and given name, becomes ssi and given name)	Husband	Gimhae Kim (金海金)	Gim	Mu-Hyeon (武鉉)	Ssi and given name Kim Mu-Hyeon (金武鉉)
1940 to 1945: sōshi-kaimei (the legal name, which used to be seong and given name, becomes ssi and given name)	Wife	Gyeongju Yi (慶州李)	Gim	Mu-a (撫兒)	Ssi and given name Kim Mu-a (金撫兒)
1940 to 1945: sōshi-kaimei (the legal name, which used to be seong and given name, becomes ssi and given name)	In the case of a ssi created by the individual				
1940 to 1945: sōshi-kaimei (the legal name, which used to be seong and given name, becomes ssi and given name)	Husband	Gimhae Kim (金海金)	Yamato (大和)	Takehiro (武鉉)	Ssi and given name Yamato Takehiro (大和武鉉)
1940 to 1945: sōshi-kaimei (the legal name, which used to be seong and given name, becomes ssi and given name)	Wife	Gyeongju Yi (慶州李)	Yamato (大和)	Nadeshiko (撫子)	Ssi and given name Yamato Nadeshiko (大和撫子)
After 1946 Name Restoration Order	Husband	Gimhae Kim (金海金)	None	Mu-Hyeon (武鉉)	Seong and given name Kim Mu-Hyeon (金武鉉)
After 1946 Name Restoration Order	Wife	Gyeongju Yi (慶州李)	None	Mu-a (撫兒)	Seong and given name Yi Mu-a (李撫兒)

- The application period for the creation of a ssi was limited to six months in length, while there was no time limit placed on the change of given name
- Children inherited their father's clan and family name
- Children of an unmarried woman inherited the woman's clan and family name
- Even if one married, the recorded native region and clan name could not be changed
- According to customary Korean law (now no longer followed), one can not marry a person of the same clan name and the same clan origin related within 6 or 8 degrees

== See also ==
- Japanese name
- Korean name
- Koreans in Japan
- Ethnic issues in Japan
- Legislation on Chinese Indonesians
- Thai cultural mandates
- Final Solution of the Czech Question
- Cultural genocide
