= Hong Sa-ik =

Korean-Japanese war criminal 1889–1946

- 홍사익
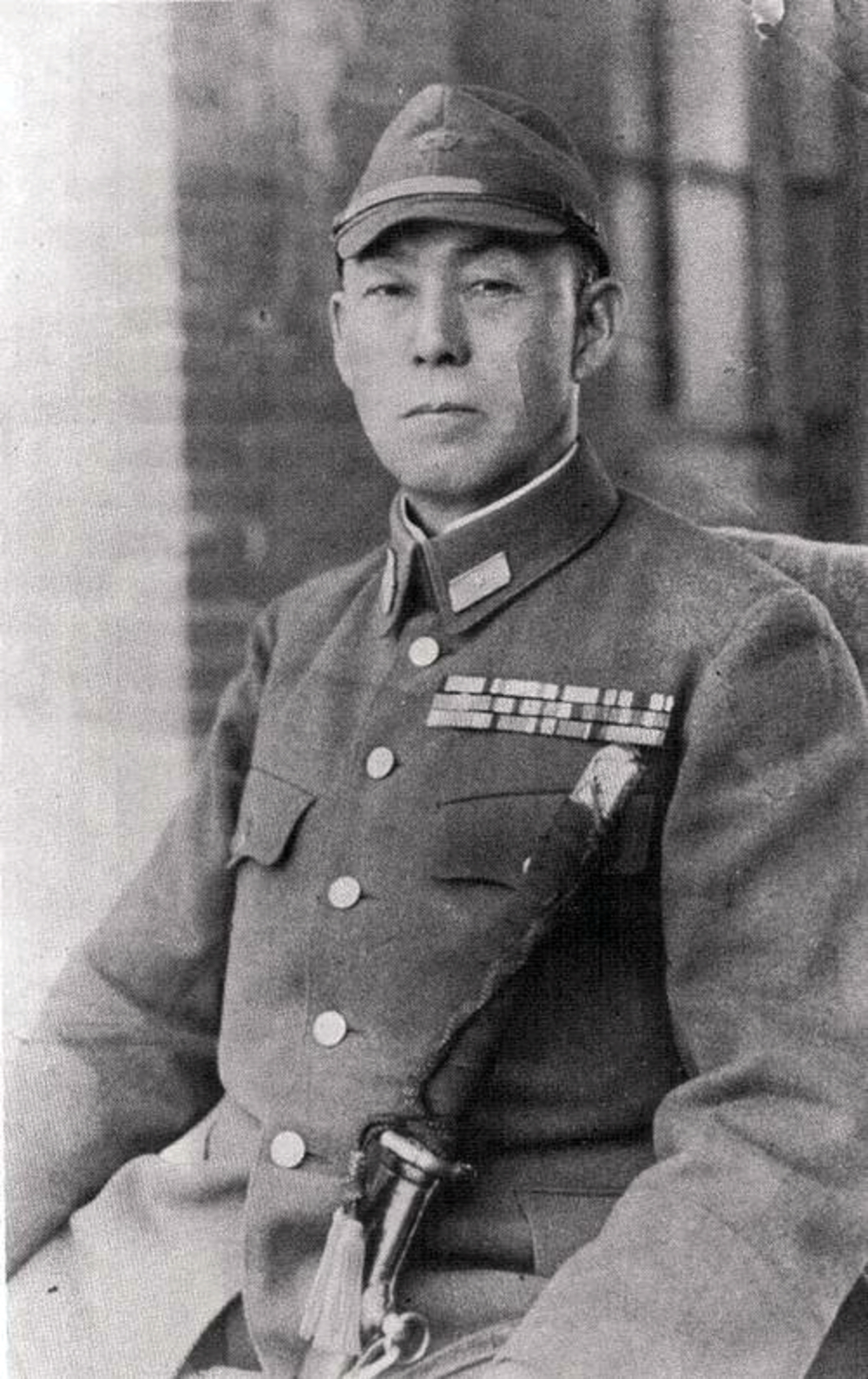
- Born: 4 March 1889; Anseong, Gyeonggi Province, Joseon
- Died: 26 September 1946 (aged 57); Manila, Commonwealth of the Philippines
- Cause of death: Execution by hanging
- Military career
- Allegiance: Empire of Japan
- Branch: Imperial Japanese Army
- Service years: 1914–1946
- Rank: Lieutenant General
- Unit: Fourteenth Area Army
- Conflicts: World War II; Philippines campaign (1944–1945)

Hong Sa-ik

Japanese name
- Kana: ホン・サイク
Transcriptions
- Romanization: Hon Saiku

Alternative Japanese name
- Kana: こう しよく
Transcriptions
- Romanization: Kō Shiyoku

Korean name
- Hangul: 홍사익
- Hanja: 洪思翊
Transcriptions
- Revised Romanization: Hong Saik
- McCune–Reischauer: Hong Saik

Hong Sa-ik (Korean: 홍사익; 4 March 1889 – 26 September 1946), also known by the Japanese reading of his name Kō Shiyoku (洪 思翊), was a lieutenant general in the Imperial Japanese Army and the top-ranking ethnic Korean in Japan to be charged with war crimes relating to the conduct of the Empire of Japan in World War II.

A graduate of the Imperial Japanese Army Academy, Hong was placed in command of the Japanese camps holding Allied (primarily U.S. and Filipino) prisoners of war in the Philippines during the latter part of World War II, where many of the camp guards were of Korean ethnicity.

Hong was held responsible for all the atrocities committed by Imperial Japanese Army prison guards against Allied POWs in Philippines, and was hanged in 1946.

== Early career ==
Hong, a member of the Namyang Hong clan, was born in 1889 to a yangban family in Anseong, Gyeonggi Province, Joseon. In 1905, when the Eulsa Treaty was signed, he entered the military academy of the Korean Empire. With the abolition of the academy in 1909, he transferred to Japan's Central Military Preparatory School (陸軍中央幼年学校, Rikugun Chūō Yōnen Gakkō) as a government-financed student along with Crown Prince Yi Un on the orders of dethroned Emperor Gojong.

Soon after, he advanced to the Imperial Japanese Army Academy. At that time, several students from the Empire of Korea were enrolled at the military academy, and with the 1910 annexation of Korea by Japan, a few left the academy to join the movements for Korean independence, but most followed the lead of Ji Cheong-cheon, who argued that they should leave to fight only after having studied and developed their skills. A few, such as Hong, attempted to stay aloof from either movement, and largely parted ways with their classmates.

In 1914, Hong graduated in the 26th class of the academy and was commissioned as a lieutenant into the Imperial Japanese Army, and in 1923 graduated from the Army War College. However, despite this, he secretly maintained his friendship with Ji and other anti-Japanese activists in the Korean Liberation Army, and even supported Ji's family with his own funds, an action which could have put Hong himself in danger if he made even a small mistake.

== Rising through the ranks ==
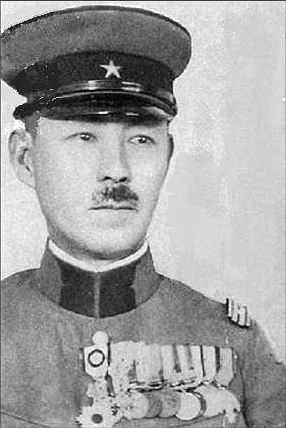
Hong as a Major

With the implementation of the sōshi-kaimei policy, Hong was under strong pressure to change his Korean name to a Japanese-style name, but he ignored the pressure and in the end did not change his name and kept his surname as Hong.

Hong continued to demonstrate exceptional ability and was rapidly promoted through the ranks, eventually rising to the rank of lieutenant general. From 1939 to 1940, he was with the China Expeditionary Army. From 1940 to 1941, he was assigned to the 1st Depot Division, and in 1941, he became the commander of the IJA 108th Infantry Brigade as a major general.

In March 1944, he went to the Philippines to command all prisoner-of-war camps. He was promoted to lieutenant general in October of the same year, and remained in the Philippines with the 14th Area Army, serving as its chief logistics officer until the cessation of hostilities.

== Trial and execution ==
After the war, Hong was tried in Manila before a military tribunal by the Allies over the conduct of his prison guards while he was commandant. The Manila tribunal sentenced Hong to death as a war criminal on 18 April 1946. He was executed by hanging on 28 September 1946. Hong, who converted to Christianity while in custody, asked a clergyman to read Psalm 51 from the Bible in his final moments.

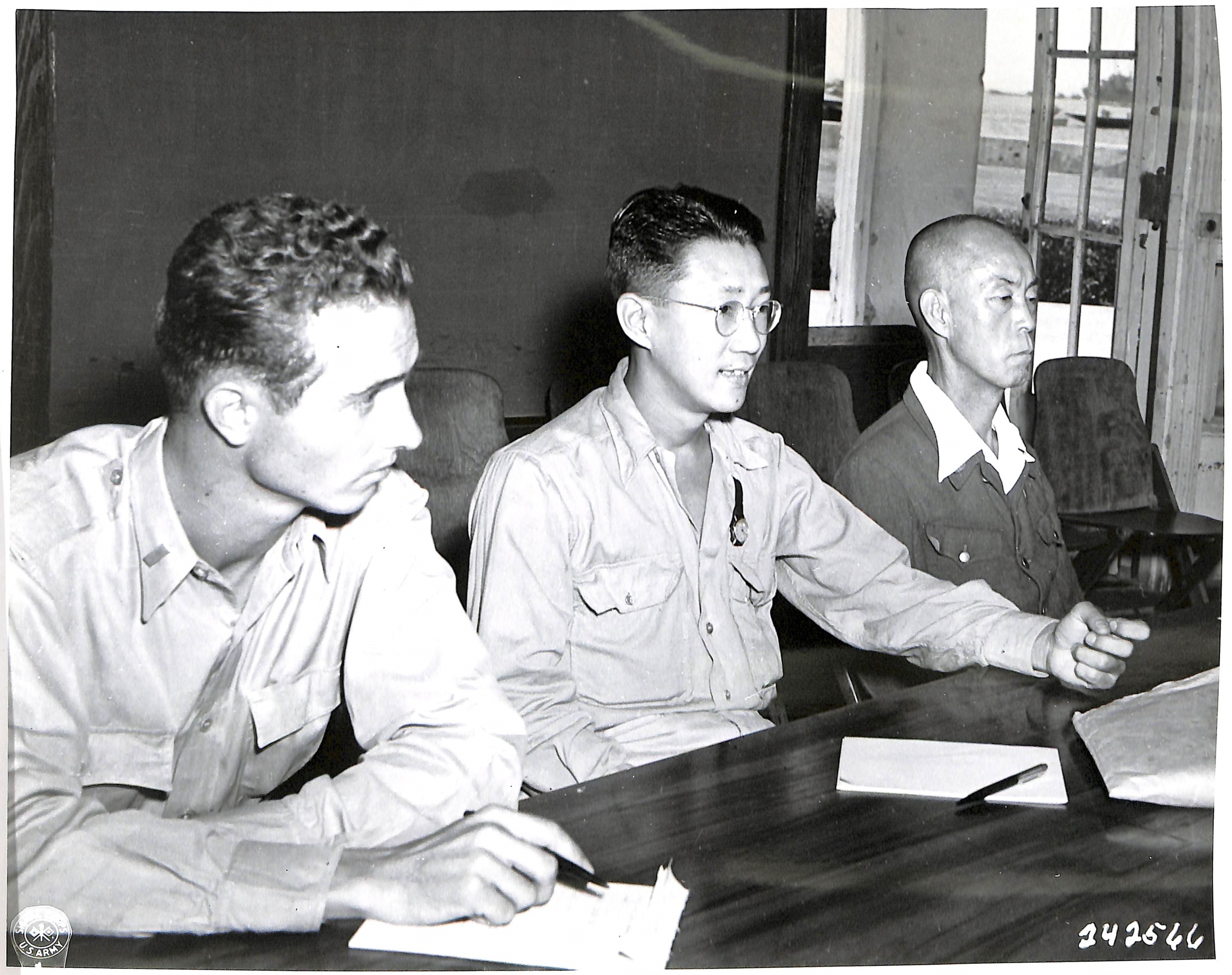
Hong (right) at his war crimes trial in 1946

== Later views ==
After Korea regained its independence, Hong's family became the target of blame and ostracism by various factions in Korea. His eldest son, Hong Guk-seon, graduated from Japan's Waseda University and afterwards worked in the Bank of Joseon, but was removed from his position on the orders of Syngman Rhee. He and his mother, Hong's widow, later emigrated to the United States.

== See also ==
- Chinilpa

== Bibliography ==
- Yamamoto, Shichihei (October 2006). 洪思翊中将の処刑 (The execution of General Hong Sa Ik). Japan: Chikuma Shobo.
- Ammenthorp, Steen. "Kou, Shiyoku". The Generals of World War II.
