= Kim Suk-won (general) =

Japanese and South Korean officer (1893–1978)

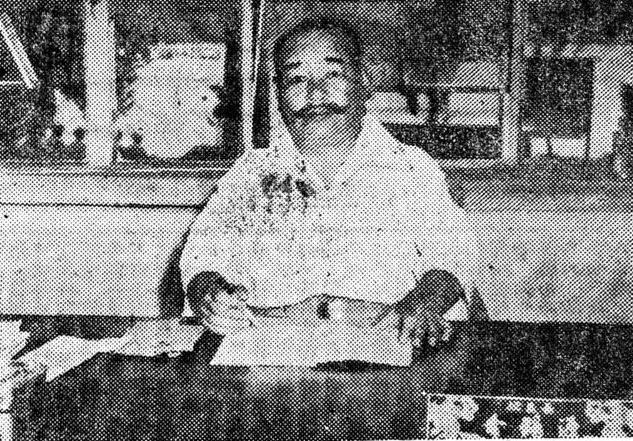
- Kim Suk-won in 1955
- Born: 29 September 1893; Seoul, Joseon
- Died: 6 August 1978 (aged 84); Seoul, South Korea
- Military career
- Allegiance: Empire of Japan/Republic of Korea
- Branch: Imperial Japanese Army; Republic of Korea Army
- Service years: 1915–1945; 1948–1950, 1950–1956
- Rank: Major general
- Conflicts: Second Sino-Japanese War; World War II; Korean War

Kim Suk-won

Japanese name
- Kanji: 金山錫源
Transcriptions
- Romanization: Kaneyama Sakugen

Korean name
- Hangul: 김석원
- Hanja: 金錫源
Transcriptions
- Revised Romanization: Gim Seogwon
- McCune–Reischauer: Kim Sŏgwŏn

Kim Suk-won (29 September 1893 – 6 August 1978) was a Korean officer in the Imperial Japanese Army during World War II. Kim was one of the highest-ranking ethnic Koreans in the Japanese Army during the Second World War. He later became a general in the Republic of Korea Army during the Korean War.

== Biography ==
Born in Seoul, Kim was sent to Japan for studies in 1909 just before the Empire of Korea was annexed by Japan.

Kim entered the 27th class of the Imperial Japanese Army Academy in 1913. At that time, there were several students from Korea enrolled at the military academy. Many of those who opposed the annexation had already left to join in the movements for Korean independence; others followed the advice of Ji Cheong-cheon, who argued that they should stay and learn military skills from the Japanese before joining the independence movements. However, Kim saw the annexation of Korea as an opportunity for advancement, and a chance to prove his loyalty to Japan. Following his 1915 graduation, Kim was assigned to the IJA 4th Division, based in Osaka. In 1917, Kim was promoted to the rank of first lieutenant.

=== Invasion of Manchuria ===
During the 1931 invasion of Manchuria, Kim was captain of a mechanised artillery division, which had a distinguished combat record. After the 1937 outbreak of the Second Sino-Japanese War, Kim was further promoted to major, and assigned to the IJA 20th Division based outside of Seoul, which was a singular indication of the trust that he had attained within the Japanese military.

=== Second Sino-Japanese War ===
Kim was dispatched to mainland China in July 1937. Prior to departing, he announced that he intended to die for the Emperor in battle and asked that a school be established in his memory, to be financed partly by the 700 won reward money he had received from Emperor Hirohito for his previous victories in Manchuria. However, this request alarmed the officials in the Japanese administration in Korea, who felt that such a school in honor of an ethnic Korean might foster Korean nationalism.

Kim distinguished himself again at the Battle of Dingwon on 28 July 1937, where he led two companies of Japanese soldiers in a seven-hour hand-to-hand combat that smashed a Chinese division. He was awarded several medals and the Governor-General of Korea gave his permission for a school, the "Won Suk Academy", to be founded in 1938. This academy is known today as Seongnam Junior and Senior High Schools.

Following the 1939 implementation of the sōshi-kaimei (name change) policy, Kim adopted the Japanese style name Kaneyama Shakugen, by adding the character for "mountain" to his Korean surname Kim; his Japanese given name "Shakugen" was just the Japanese reading of his Korean name.

In March 1939, Kim was promoted to lieutenant colonel soon after returning Seoul, reassigned to the 78th Infantry Regiment of the IJA 20th Division, located in Yongsan. He was awarded the Order of the Golden Kite, 3rd class. In 1944, Kim was further promoted to colonel; he was active on the home front in Korea during this time, giving speeches at schools and publishing articles in the official newspaper Maeil sinbo encouraging Korean youths to volunteer to serve in the Imperial Japanese Army. He was also instrumental in the implementation of the draft on the Korean peninsula, which began from 20 January 1944.

=== After World War II ===
After the surrender of Japan ended World War II, Kim joined the Provisional Government of the Republic of Korea's military affairs commission, and later the Republic of Korea Army, where he held the rank of brigadier general. In 1948, President Syngman Rhee put Kim in charge of the South Korean border units, and attempted to name him commander of the Republic of Korea Army, but was overridden by General Walton H. Walker of the United States Eighth Army, who distrusted Kim's background.

Kim retired from active duty, but was recalled in early July 1950 due to the outbreak of the Korean War. He was promoted to major general and retired again in 1956. Kim published his memoirs in 1977. After his death in 1978, he was buried next to Seongnam High School, of which he was one of the founders. A bronze bust of him remains standing on the school ground; in 2002, protestors attempted to have it taken down.
