= Hankyong National University =

University in Anseong, South Korea

Coordinates: 37.01159°N 127.26429°E

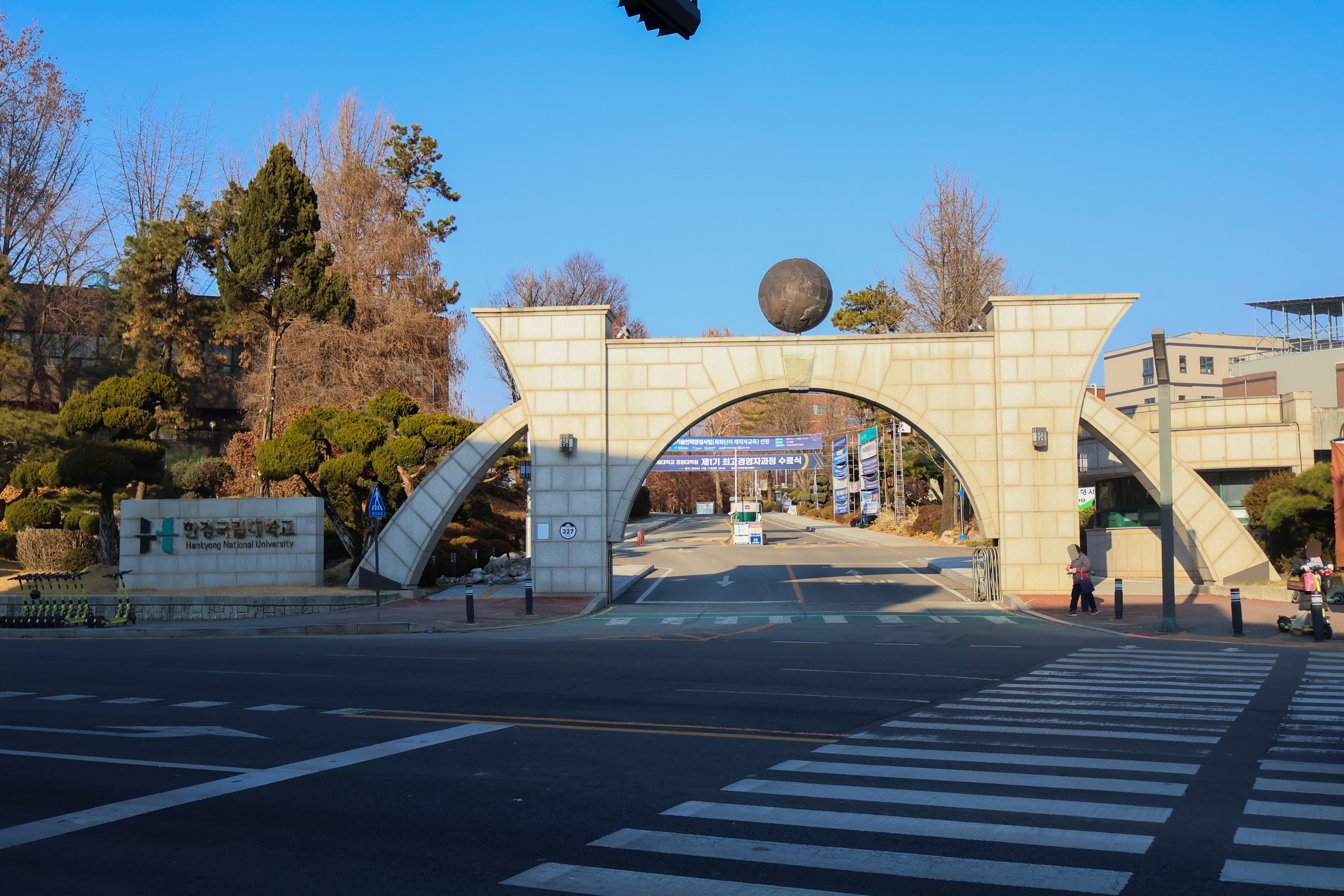
- Type: National
- Established: 1939
- Students: 7,168
- Location: Anseong, Kyonggi, South Korea
- Website: www.hknu.ac.kr

- Hankyong National University
- Hangul: 한경대학교
- Hanja: 韓京大學校
- RR: Hangyeong daehakgyo
- MR: Han'gyŏng taehakkyo

Hankyong National University (Korean: 한경대학교) is the only national university in Gyeonggi Province. It is located in Anseong, a city approximately 80 kilometres from Seoul. The university specialises in fields such as environmental engineering, agricultural science, biotechnology, information technology and computer engineering. It was founded in 1939.

== Notable people ==
- Song Seung-heon, actor

== See also ==
- List of national universities in South Korea
- List of universities and colleges in South Korea
- Education in Korea
