= Final Solution of the Czech Question =

Nazi plan for Germanification of Czechs

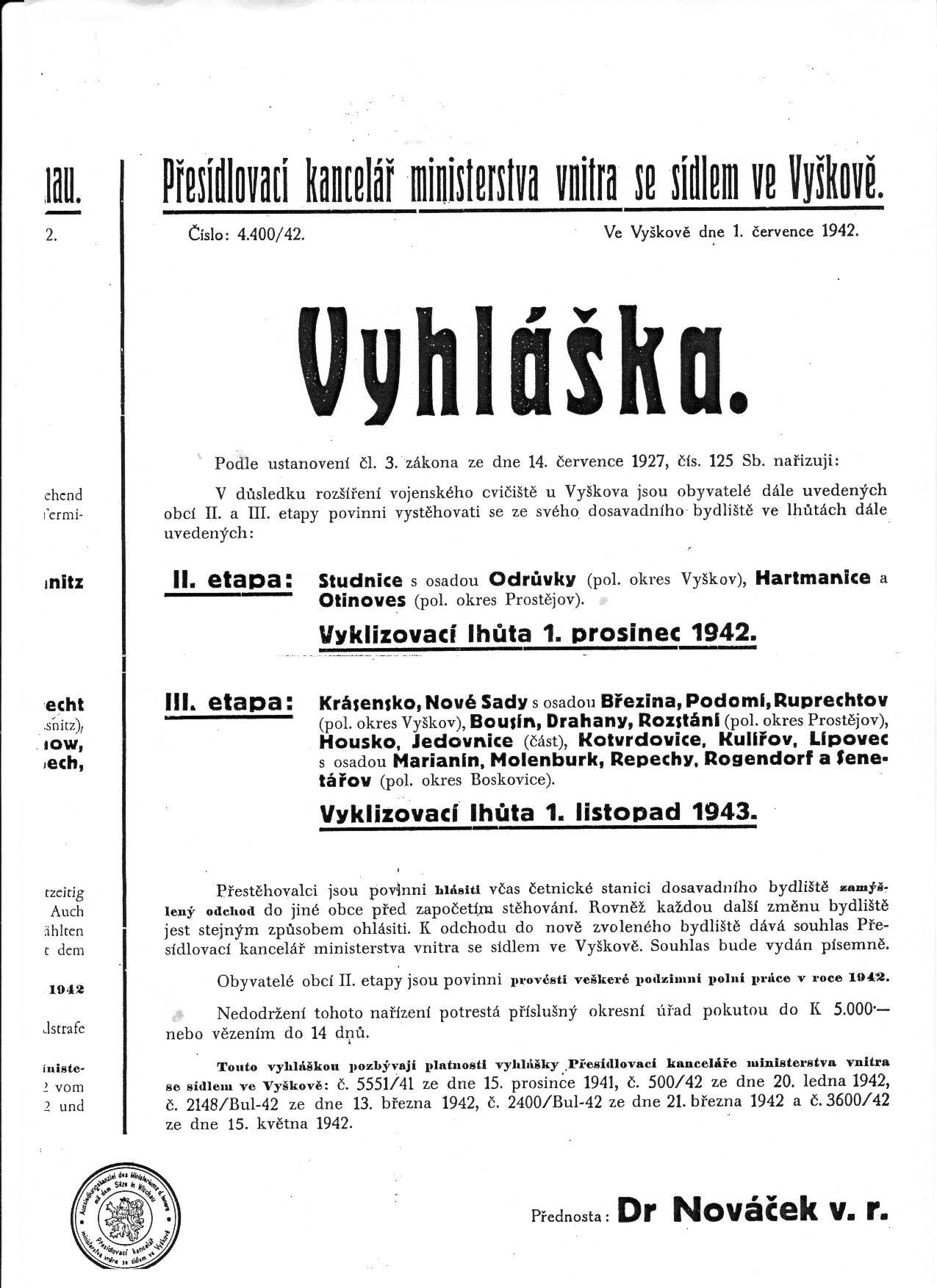
Declaration (Czech-language version) of the order for displacement of 33 municipalities on Drahan highlands

The Final Solution of the Czech Question (German: Endlösung der tschechischen Frage; Czech: Konečné řešení české otázky) was the Nazi German plan for the complete Germanization of the Protectorate of Bohemia and Moravia. Nazi German sociologist and anthropologist Karl Valentin Müller asserted that at least half (50%) of the Czech nation was "racially Nordic" and could be Germanized. This was in stark contrast to Germany's Final Solution to the Jewish question, which called for the total extermination of the Jews save for a select few "honorary Aryans". Müller asserted that Germanization of the Czechs could be first attempted without coercion; instead, he suggested a system of social incentives.

On 27 September 1941, Reinhard Heydrich was appointed Deputy Reich Protector and assumed control of the Protectorate of Bohemia and Moravia – the part of Czechoslovakia incorporated into the German Reich on 15 March 1939. This part of the Czech lands did not include the Sudetenland, which mostly consisted of ethnic Germans and were directly annexed into the Reich. The Reich Protector, Konstantin von Neurath, remained titular head but was sent on "leave" because Hitler, Himmler, and Heydrich felt his "soft approach" to the Czechs had promoted anti-German sentiment and encouraged resistance via strikes and sabotage. On his appointment, Heydrich told his aides: "We will Germanize the Czech vermin."

Heydrich came to Prague and enforced such policies, fought resistance to the Nazi regime, and kept up production quotas of Czech motors and arms that were "extremely important to the German war effort". He viewed the area as a bulwark of Germandom and condemned the Czech resistance's "stabs in the back". In the furtherance of his goals, Heydrich decreed racial classification of those who could and could not be Germanized. He explained: "Making this Czech garbage into Germans must yield to methods based on racist thought." He was eventually assassinated by the Czech resistance as part of Operation Anthropoid, which led to a wave of reprisals by Schutzstaffel (SS) troops, including the destruction of villages and mass killings of civilians, notably the Lidice massacre.

In 1940, Hitler agreed that around half of the Czech population were suitable for Germanization, including the kidnapping of thousands of Czech children to be brought up as Germans, while the others deemed not "racially valuable" (i.e. "Untermensch") and the Czech intelligentsia were not to be Germanized and were instead to be “deprived of [their] power, eliminated, and shipped out of the country by all sorts of methods.” Under Generalplan Ost, the Nazis had intended to displace the un-Germanizable population to Siberia. However, due to the war effort's need for labor, this plan was never implemented.

== See also ==
- Anti-Slavic sentiment
- Occupation of Czechoslovakia (1938–1945)
- German war crimes
- Sōshi-kaimei

== Sources ==
- Mikš, Ing. Josef (February 2006). "Německo a řešení české otázky" [Germany and the Czech Question] (in Czech). Křesťanskosociální hnutí. Archived from the original on 2007-08-11.
