= Doowon Technical University College =

Private college in Anseong, South Korea

Coordinates: 37.06540°N 127.42222°E

- Hangul: 두원공과대학교
- Hanja: 斗源工科大學校
- RR: Duwon gonggwa daehakgyo
- MR: Tuwŏn kongkwa taehakkyo

Doowon Technical College is a private college in Anseong, South Korea. The current president is Jung, Sang-Whan (정상환). The maximum enrollment capacity is 4,800.

== Academics ==
The school's Korean name means "Doowon Engineering College," and engineering is the primary focus of education. There are 17 academic departments at Doowon, covering fields such as mechanical engineering, digital electronics, information and communication, computer graphics, and architecture.

== Location ==
The campus is located in Juksan-myeon, a rural district of Anseong city.

== History ==
The college opened in 1994. At the time, it bore the name Doowon Technical Junior College. The name was changed in 1998.

== See also ==
- Education in South Korea
- List of colleges and universities in South Korea
