= Kim Bora (disambiguation) =

Kim Bora (born 1981) is a South Korean filmmaker.

Kim Bo-ra may also refer to:

- Kim Bo-ra (born 1995), South Korean actress
- Kim Bo-ra (politician) (born 1969), South Korean politician based in Anseong
- Bora (singer) (Kim Bo-ra, born 1999), main vocalist of South Korean pop group Cherry Bullet
