= Hangyeore High School =

School for refugees in South Korea

Coordinates: 37.03004°N 127.42223°E

Hangyeore High School Korean: 한겨레고등학교

Location
- Anseong, Gyeonggi Province; South Korea

Information
- Established: 2006; 19 years ago
- Enrollment: 144 (2010)

Hangyeore High School (한겨레고등학교) is a government-funded middle and high school for North Korean refugees adjusting to life in South Korea. It is located in Anseong, Gyeonggi Province, 80 kilometres (50 mi) south of Seoul. It opened on March 1, 2006.

Depending on a pupil's performance, he or she may stay for a period from six months to two years. The school intends for students to transition to regular South Korean schools. The school has no tuition fees. It serves three meals per day and has a school uniform. Only children and teenagers originating from North Korea are allowed to attend. The only exception to this was in 2019 when six exchange students (one from the United States, two from Germany, two from France, and one from Sweden) were allowed to attend.

As of 2010, 144 students attend the school. Of them, 79 said that they had watched South Korean media while in North Korea.
