= Drijenak =

Drijenak Дријенак
- Village
- Location within Montenegro
- Coordinates: 42.840730°N 19.508951°E
- Country: Montenegro
- Region: Northern
- Municipality: Kolašin

Population (2011)
  - Total: 525
- Time zone: UTC+1 (CET)
  - Summer (DST): UTC+2 (CEST)

Drijenak (Montenegrin Cyrillic: Дријенак) is a village in the municipality of Kolašin, Montenegro.

== Demographics ==
According to the 2011 census, its population was 525.

Ethnicity in 2011
| Ethnicity | Number | Percentage |
|---|---|---|
| Montenegrins | 268 | 51.0% |
| Serbs | 209 | 39.8% |
| other/undeclared | 48 | 9.1% |
| Total | 525 | 100% |
