= Expulsion of Yugoslavs from Albania =

- Part of the Cold War, Informbiro period and the Albanian–Yugoslav border conflict (1948–1954)
- Type: Military Expulsion
- Location: Albania
- Commanded by: (Albania) Enver Hoxha (Albania) Kadri Hazbiu
- Target: (Socialist Federal Republic of Yugoslavia) Yugoslavs: Politicians; Military advisors from the Yugoslav People's Army; Civilians
- Date: 1948–1954
- Executed by: Albanian People's Army; Sigurimi
- Casualties: Bosniak family was executed (Socialist Federal Republic of Yugoslavia) Purge of Yugoslav factions (Socialist Federal Republic of Yugoslavia) 3,500 Yugoslavs were expelled

During the Albanian–Yugoslav border conflict, the People's Republic of Albania under Enver Hoxha expelled approximately 3,500 Yugoslav civilians and personnel.

== Background ==
In 1948, relations between Communist Albania and Yugoslavia deteriorated dramatically. The two countries, which had previously maintained close political and economic ties, came into conflict due to ideological differences between the Albanian leadership under Enver Hoxha and the Yugoslav government led by Josip Broz Tito. This led to tensions between the two nations and had a profound impact on the Yugoslav minority in Albania.

== Course of events ==
Throughout 1948, many Yugoslavs in Albania were expelled on charges of espionage and loyalty to Tito. This occurred in response to the ideological rift between Albania and Yugoslavia, as well as Albania's foreign policy alignment with the Soviet Union.

The expulsions often took place under difficult conditions, and those affected frequently lost their property and livelihoods in Albania. As a result, a total of 3,500 Yugoslav civilians, politicians, military personnel and advisors were expelled from all over Albania by the Albanian People's Army and the Sigurimi led by Enver Hoxha and Kadri Hazbiu.

Also, during the expulsion, a Bosniak family was executed by Kadri Hazbiu and his Albanian Security Services agents for being Yugoslav agents of the UDBA.

== Aftermath ==
After the expulsion of the Yugoslavs from Albania, Enver Hoxha began closing the borders between Yugoslavia and Albania. He then initiated a campaign to hunt down and eliminate Yugoslav factions that remained in Albania. This purge continued beyond 1948, with Hoxha also targeting pro-Yugoslav sympathizers, which lasted until 1954. As an example, he ordered the execution of the Albanian agent, Koçi Xoxe, who was affiliated with Tito.
