= Anseong =

City in Gyeonggi, South Korea

- Municipal City
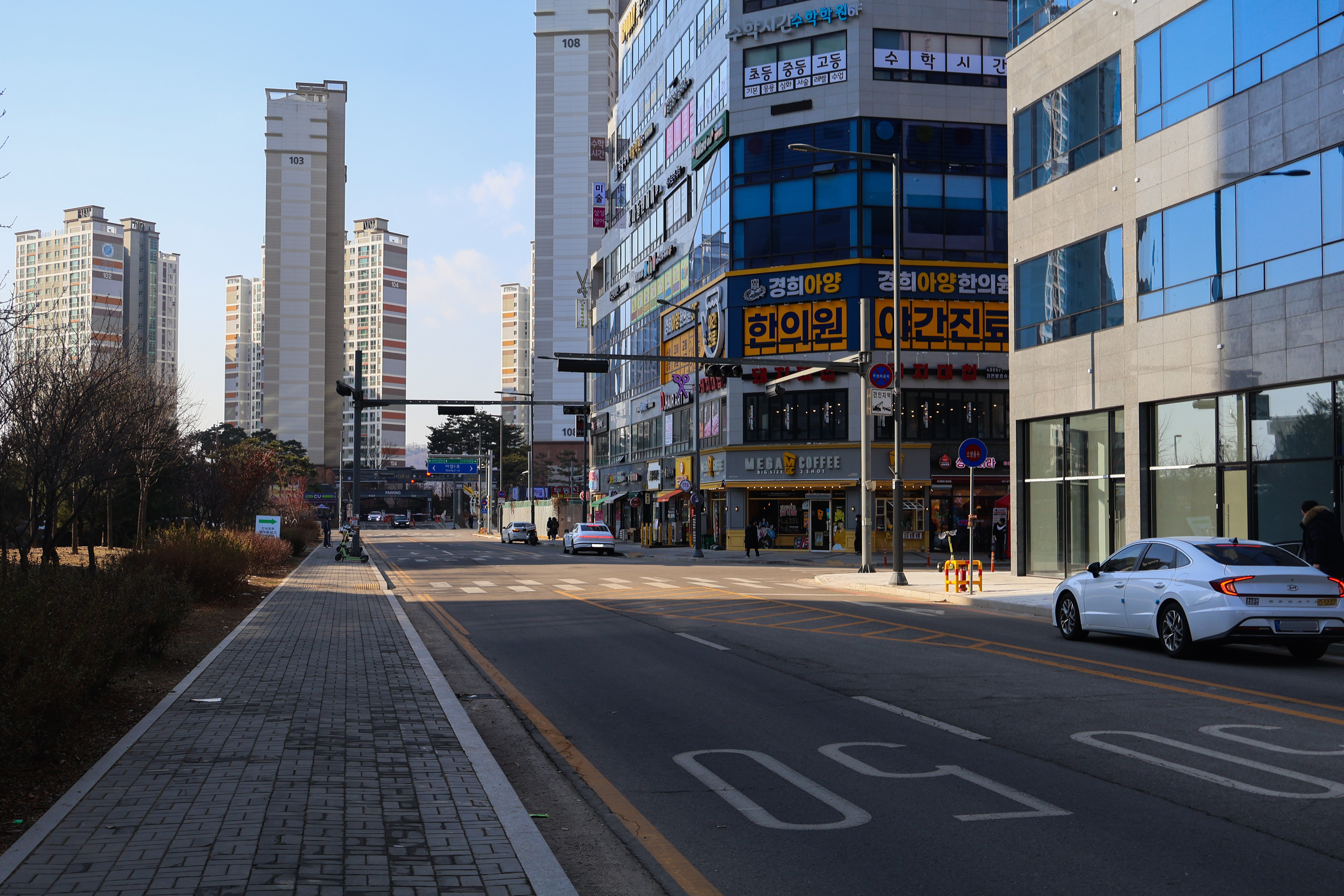
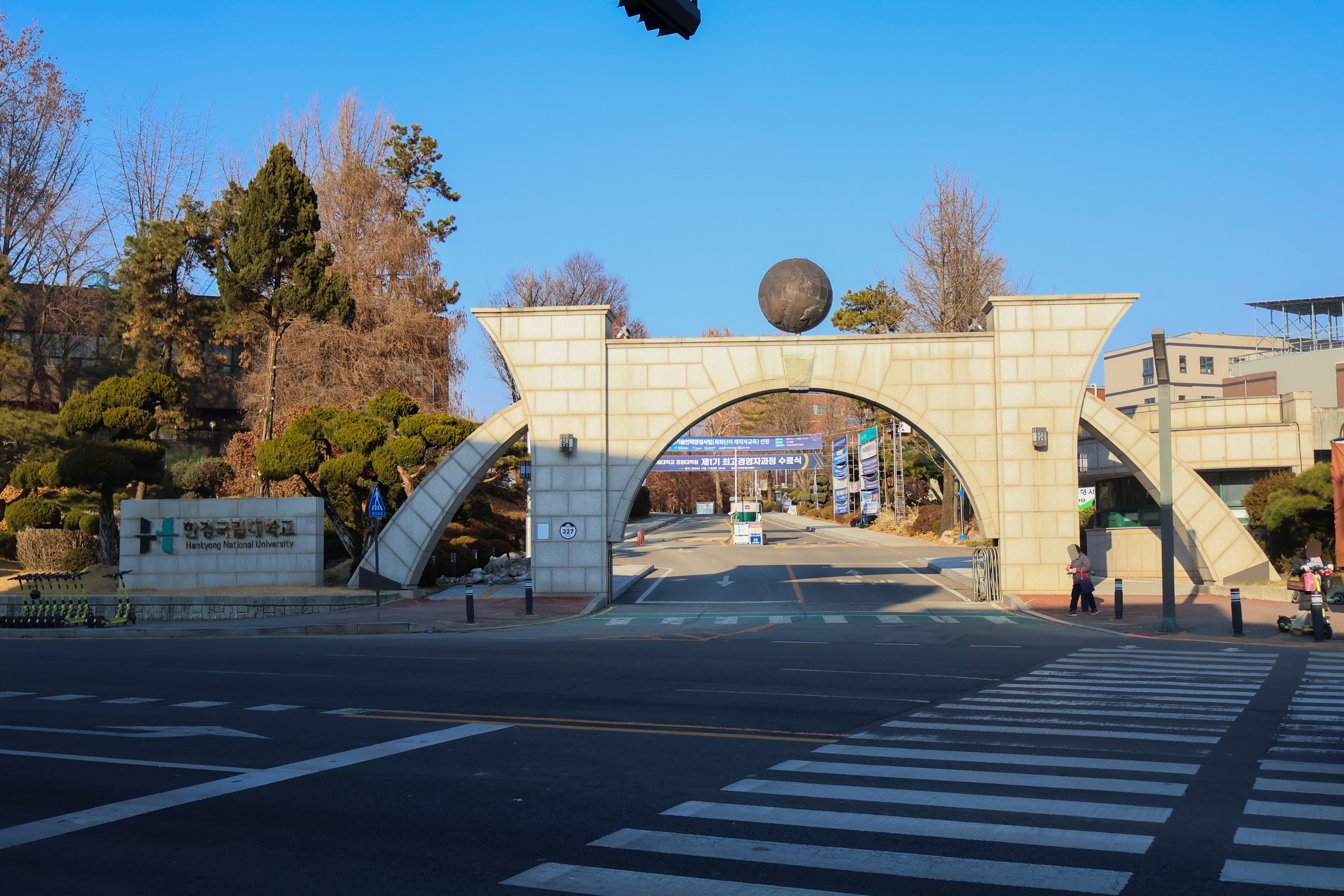
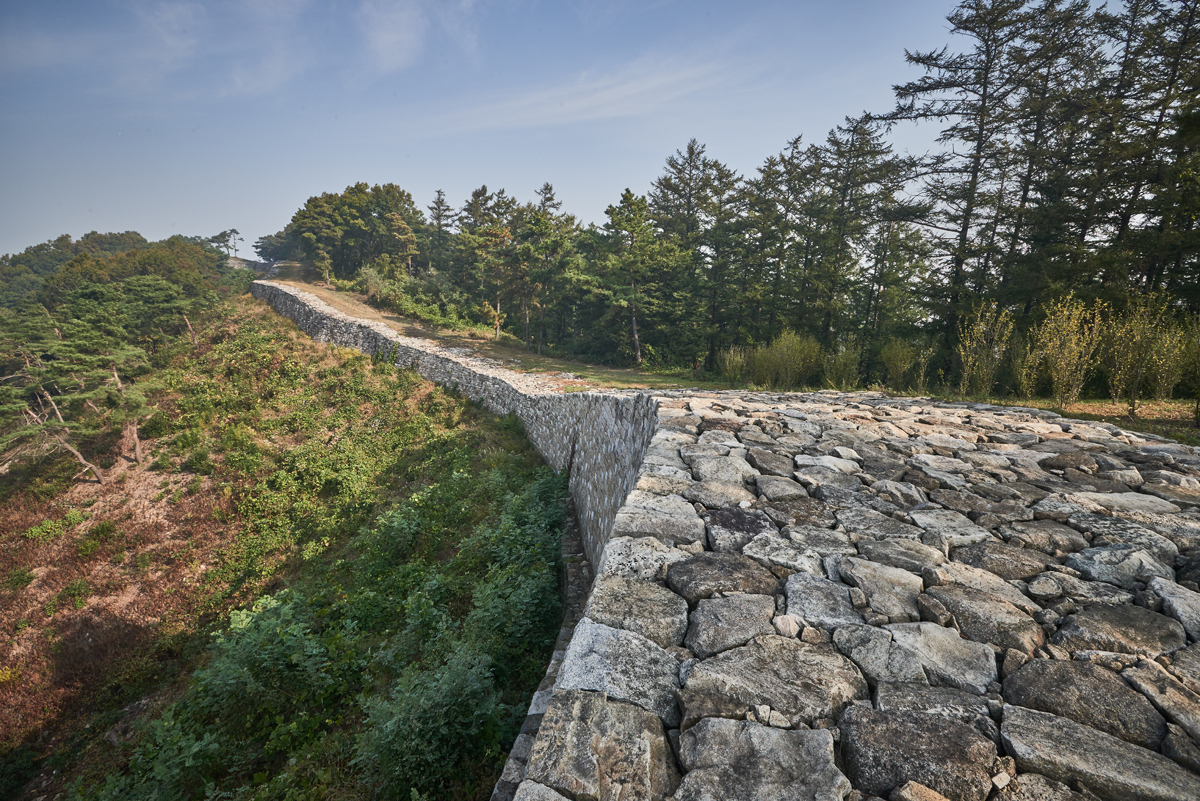
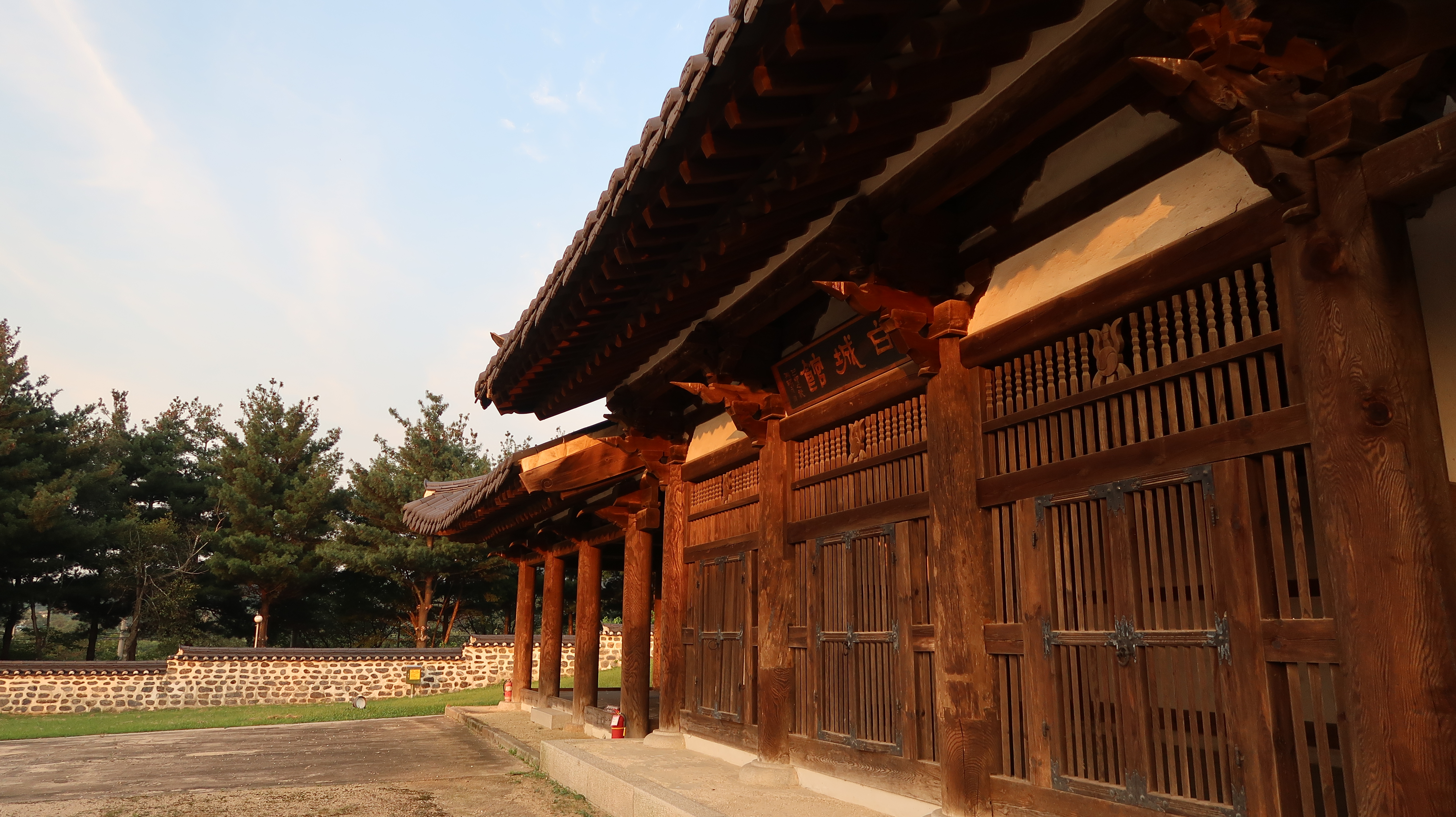
- Oksan-Dong Hankyong National University Jukjusanseong Fortress Anseong Gaeksa

- Flag
- Interactive map of Anseong
- Country: South Korea
- Region: Gyeonggi Province (Sudogwon)
- Administrative divisions: 1 eup, 11 myeon, 33 dong

Government
  - Mayor: Kim Bo-ra (Democratic)

Area
  - Total: 554.2 km^{2} (214.0 sq mi)

Population (July 2025)
  - Total: 196,303
  - Density: 354.2/km^{2} (917.4/sq mi)
  - Dialect: Gyeonggi

Korean name
- Hangul: 안성시
- Hanja: 安城市
- RR: Anseong-si
- MR: Ansŏng-si

Anseong (Korean: 안성; Korean pronunciation: [an.sʌŋ]) is a city in Gyeonggi Province, South Korea, 80 kilometres (50 mi) south of Seoul. Anseong promotes itself as "The City of Masters". It is known for producing brassware and arts and crafts. From late spring to fall, Anseong holds its own Namsadang Neuri Festival. The agriculture of Anseong is centered around Asian pears, grapes, ginseng, and rice, while Hanwoo is considered to be the most famous and high-quality. Anseong joined the UNESCO Global Network of Learning Cities in 2025.

Anseong is the center of all traffic in Korea. It is connected to all highways in the country, and there are nine interchanges, the most in South Korea.

The pronoun AnseongMachum ("Anseong Perfect") is a word that was born from Anseong Yugi. And in addition, AmseongPyeongya (Anseong Plain), Anseongcheon (Anseong River), Anseong Line (Train) are all Anseong is the source (The railway was closed in 1990, and it is preparing to revive the railway again after 30 years *2028–2032*).

== Modern history ==
In 1963, Gosam town of Yongin was incorporated by Anseong, which was still a county at the time. In 1983, Anseong 6 jurisdictions Compulsory incorporation without the consent of the residents to district of Pyeongtaek. In 1998, Anseong was upgraded from county to city status.

It borders Pyeongtaek to the west, Yongin to the north, Icheon and Eumseong-gun to the east, and Cheonan, South Chungcheong Province and Jincheon-gun, North Chungcheong Province to the south. It is located in the southernmost part of Gyeonggi Province and is adjacent to Chungcheong Province along with Pyeongtaek, so it serves as a gateway to the rest of the country. For this reason, in the past, it was counted as one of three major commercial centers in Korea with Daegu and Jeonju. At that time, Anseong was a bustling city. In particular, the 5-day market held on the 2nd and 7th of every month was one of the three largest markets in Joseon.

- On April 1, 1998, Anseong City was established with jurisdiction over the entire Anseong County.
- On June 1, 2001, Gongdo-myeon was promoted to Gongdo-eup.

== Population ==
- Anseong, Gyeonggi-do population trend &key developments (1966~present)
- 1966: 144,274
- 1970: 133,404
- 1975: 132,888
- 1980: 127,891
- 1983: Yong'e-ri, Jukbaek-ri, Cheongyong-ri, Wolgok-ri, Wongok-myeon, Sosa-ri, Gongdo-myeon were transferred to Pyeongtaek-eup, Pyeongtaek-gun.[Compulsory incorporation without collecting and consent from residents]
- 1985: 121,752
- 1990: 118,260
- 1995: 124,671
- 1998: Anseong was upgraded from county to city status.
- 2000: 136,590
- 2005: 157,130
- 2010: 177,937
- 2015: 180,199
- 2020: 187,012
- 2022: 189,648
- June 2024: 191,272

The populations given are based on the administrative districts at the time, not the current administrative district.

1966–1990: National Statistical Office Census, 1995–Present: Resident Registration Population Statistics of Ministry of Public Administration and Security

== Education ==
Institutions of higher learning in Anseong include:

- Ansung Women's Polytechnic College
- Capital Baptist Theological Seminary
- Chung-Ang University (Anseong campus)
- Dong-Ah Broadcasting College
- Doowon Technical College
- Hankyong National University

Hangyeore Middle and High School, a special school for North Korean refugees, is in Anseong.

Valor international school (Anseong Campus) [2017 Open]

== Geography ==
Land area by type and usage:

- Overall, the northeast is high and the southwest is gentle, so the Cheongmicheon Mountain Range, which runs north to south, becomes a watershed that divides the region into east and west. To the east, Cheongmicheon flows, and to the west, Anseongcheon, Jollingcheon, and Hancheon join and flow into the West Sea. To the south, Seounsan Mountain (547m) rises, forming a boundary with Chungcheongnam-do and Chungcheongbuk-do, and large, low mountains surround the entire region like a folding screen. To the south and west, there are hills for middle-aged and elderly people, and wide plains due to the development of rivers.

== Climate ==
Anseong has a humid continental climate (Köppen: Dwa), but can be considered a borderline humid subtropical climate (Köppen: Cwa) using the −3 °C (27 °F) isotherm.

Climate data for Anseong (1993–2020 normals)
Month	Jan	Feb	Mar	Apr	May	Jun	Jul	Aug	Sep	Oct	Nov	Dec	Year
Mean daily maximum °C (°F)	2.8 (37.0)	5.8 (42.4)	12.2 (54.0)	19.0 (66.2)	24.6 (76.3)	28.3 (82.9)	30.2 (86.4)	31.0 (87.8)	26.7 (80.1)	20.8 (69.4)	12.7 (54.9)	4.7 (40.5)	18.2 (64.8)
Daily mean °C (°F)	−2.4 (27.7)	0.2 (32.4)	5.6 (42.1)	12.2 (54.0)	18.1 (64.6)	22.7 (72.9)	25.6 (78.1)	26.1 (79.0)	21.2 (70.2)	14.3 (57.7)	6.9 (44.4)	−0.4 (31.3)	12.5 (54.5)
Mean daily minimum °C (°F)	−7.3 (18.9)	−4.8 (23.4)	−0.2 (31.6)	5.9 (42.6)	12.2 (54.0)	17.9 (64.2)	22.1 (71.8)	22.5 (72.5)	16.8 (62.2)	8.8 (47.8)	1.7 (35.1)	−5.1 (22.8)	7.5 (45.5)
Average precipitation mm (inches)	19.0 (0.75)	23.3 (0.92)	34.9 (1.37)	68.5 (2.70)	72.6 (2.86)	125.3 (4.93)	323.1 (12.72)	267.0 (10.51)	149.1 (5.87)	50.7 (2.00)	41.4 (1.63)	20.0 (0.79)	1,194.9 (47.04)
Average precipitation days (≥ 0.1 mm)	4.5	3.7	5.8	7.0	6.6	7.2	12.8	11.6	7.6	5.1	6.8	5.1	83.8
Source: Korea Meteorological Administration

== Administrative districts ==
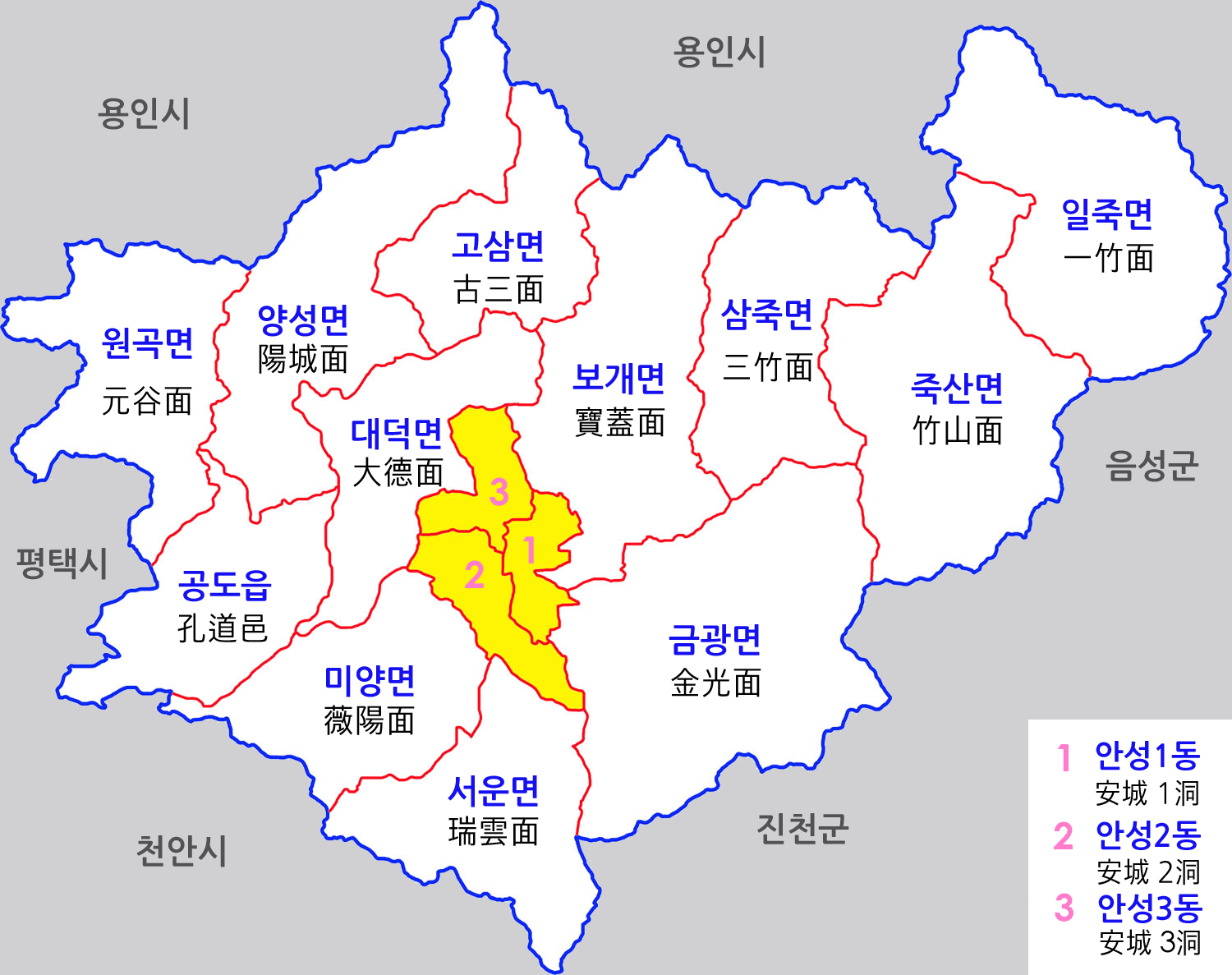
Map of Anseong in Korean

The city is divided into one eup (town) and 11 myeon (townships) and three dong (neighborhoods):

Name	Hangul	Hanja	Population	Households	Area (km^{2})
Gongdo-eup	공도읍	孔道邑	57,948	21,161	31.96
Bogae-myeon	보개면	寶蓋面	6,574	2,606	53.01
Geumgwang-myeon	금광면	金光面	8,755	3,515	71.71
Seoun-myeon	서운면	瑞雲面	4,479	1,739	36.28
Miyang-myeon	미양면	薇陽面	8,167	3,033	33.73
Daedeok-myeon	대덕면	大德面	12,606	6,362	31.16
Yangseong-myeon	양성면	陽城面	6,137	2,506	53.17
Wongok-myeon	원곡면	元谷面	5,607	2,253	37.83
Gosam-myeon	고삼면	古三面	2,163	918	27.79
Iljuk-myeon	일죽면	一竹面	9,229	3,669	55.54
Juksan-myeon	죽산면	竹山面	7,842	3,400	57.26
Samjuk-myeon	삼죽면	三竹面	4,113	1,688	39.07
Anseong1-dong	안성1동	安城1洞	13,444	5,306	6.55
Anseong2-dong	안성2동	安城2洞	19,460	7,322	10.14
Anseong3-dong	안성3동	安城3洞	23,571	8,136	8.27

== Sister Cities ==
- Jongno District, Seoul
- Brea, California, United States

== Notable people from Anseong ==
- Hong Sa-ik, Zainichi Korean war criminal and lieutenant general of the Imperial Japanese Army
- Pak Tu-jin, South Korean poet
- Cho Byung-hwa, South Korean poet, critic and essayist
- Kim Soo-ro, South Korean actor
- Andrew Yeom Soo-jung, South Korean cardinal of the Catholic Church and the South Korean Roman Catholic Archbishop of Seoul

== Gallery ==
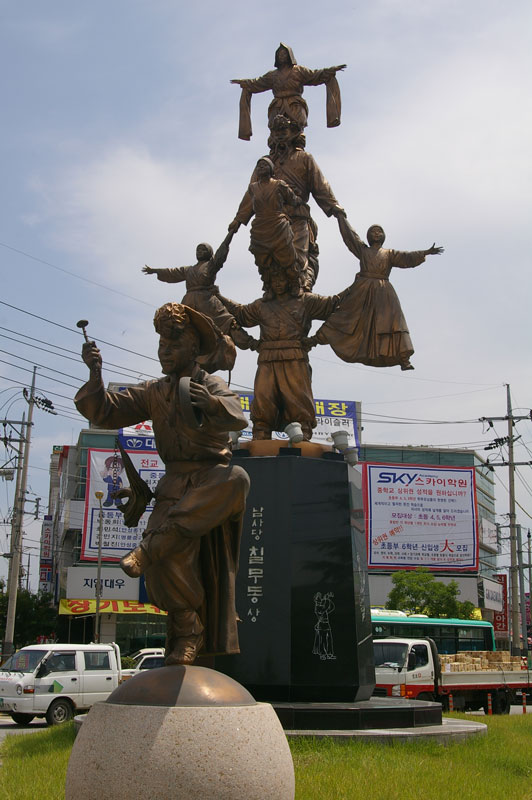
Statue of Namsadang Neuri

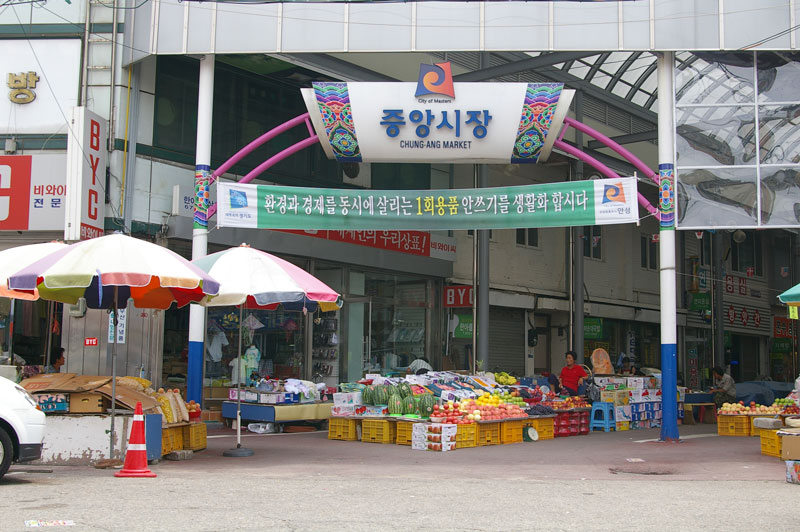
Chung-ang Market

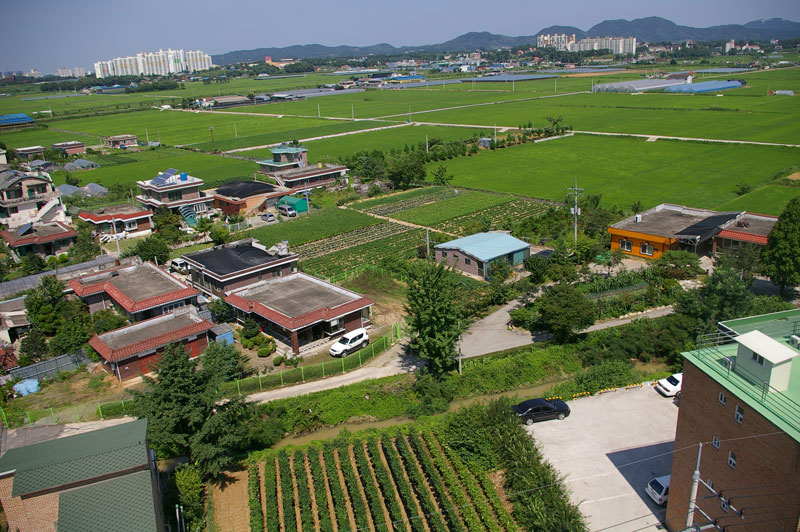
Rice fields

== See also ==
- List of cities in South Korea
- Geography of South Korea
