= Kim Bo-ra (politician) =

South Korean politician (born 1969)

- 김보라

Mayor of Anseong
- Incumbent
- Assumed office 16 April 2020
- Preceded by: Woo Seok-jae

Member of Gyeonggi Assembly
- In office 1 July 2014 – 30 June 2018
- Constituency: proportional representation

Personal details
- Born: 8 September 1969 (age 57)
- Party: Democratic
- Education: Yonsei University; Pyeongtaek University

Kim Bo-ra (Korean: 김보라; Hanja: 金補羅; born 8 September 1969) is a South Korean politician serving as mayor of Anseong in Gyeonggi Province having taken office in April 2020. She is the city's first ever female mayor.

Before entering politics in 2014, Kim led various non-governmental organisations on social enterprise, medical cooperatives and local social welfare.

In the 2014 election, Kim was placed as number 3 of the proportional list of her party for Gyeonggi Provincial legislature. Since then, she took numerous roles in Gyeonggi Assembly, Gyeonggi branch of her party and her party at Gyeonggi Assembly. She also took multiple roles in her party - vice chair of its Social economy Committee, Special Committee on Fine Dust and Women's Committee as well as director of Social Economy centre of party thinktank.

Before running for mayor, Kim was the deputy spokesperson of her party.

In the 2020 by-election Kim ran for Mayor of Anseong - the post vacated by Woo Seok-jae (Korean: 우석제) from her party who was removed from the office after the Supreme Court found Woo guilty of breaking the election law.

Kim was previously an adjunct professor of nursing at Sangmyung University from 2013 to 2014 and Soonchunhyang University from 2005 to 2007 as well as a visiting professor at Hanshin University from 2017 to 2018.

Kim holds two degrees - a bachelor in nursing from Yonsei University and a master's in social welfare from Pyeongtaek University.

== Electoral history ==
Election	Year	Post	Party affiliation	Votes	Percentage of votes	Results
6th Local Election	2014	Member of Gyeonggi Assembly (proportional representation)	New Politics Alliance for Democracy (NPAD)	2,204,004	43.78%	Won
By-election	2020	Mayor of Anseong	Democratic Party	44,930	46.31%	Won
