= Sejong A =

Constituency in Sejong City, South Korea

- Single-member constituency for the National Assembly
- Location of the constituency
- District(s): Sejong City (part)
- Region: Sejong City
- Electorate: 171,472 (2024)

Current constituency
- Created: 2020
- Seats: 1
- Party: Independent
- Member: Kim Jong-min
- Created from: Sejong

Sejong A (Korean: 세종특별자치시 갑) is a constituency of the National Assembly of South Korea. The constituency consists of the southern portion of Sejong City. As of 2024, 171,472 eligible voters were registered in the constituency.

== History ==
Sejong A was created ahead of the 2020 South Korean legislative election from the former Sejong constituency as a result of an increase in the area's voter population.

Sejong A is generally viewed as a Democratic Party stronghold as the area consistently voted for the candidates affiliated with the Democratic Party in previous elections.

== Boundaries ==
The constituency consists of the more urban neighborhoods of Hansol-dong, Saerom-dong, Dodam-dong, Sodam-dong, Boram-dong, Daepyeong-dong, Dajeong-dong, and the townships of Bugang-myeon, Geumnam-myeon, and Janggun-myeon.

== List of members of the National Assembly ==
Election	Member	Party	Dates	Notes
2020	Hong Seong-guk	Democratic	2020–2024	
2024	Kim Jong-min	New Future	2024-present	vice presidential spokesperson (2004) presidential spokesperson (2004–2005); Deputy Governor of South Chungcheong Province (2010–2011); Co-leader of the New Future (2024); Floor leader of the New Future (2024)

== Election results ==
=== 2024 ===
Legislative Election 2024: Sejong A
Party	Candidate	Votes	%	±%
New Future	Kim Jong-min	65,599	56.93	new
People Power	Ryu Je-hua	49,622	43.06	▲10.27
Rejected ballots		6,700	–	
Turnout		121,921	71.10	▲0.66
Registered electors		171,472		
New Future gain from Democratic		Swing		

=== 2020 ===
Legislative Election 2020: Sejong A
Party	Candidate	Votes	%	±%
Democratic	Hong Seong-guk	55,947	56.45	–
United Future	Kim Joong-ro	32,496	32.79	–
Justice	Lee Hyeok-jae	5,522	5.57	–
Independent	Yoon Hyeong-gwon	3,458	3.48	–
Independent	Park Sang-rae	1,167	1.17	–
National Revolutionary	Kim Yeong-ho	507	0.51	–
Rejected ballots		965	–	–
Turnout		100,062	70.44	–
Registered electors		142,033		
Democratic win (new seat)				

== See also ==
- List of constituencies of the National Assembly of South Korea
