= Sejong B =

Constituency in Sejong City, South Korea

- Single-member constituency for the National Assembly
- Location of the constituency
- District(s): Sejong City (part)
- Region: Sejong City
- Electorate: 129,759 (2024)

Current constituency
- Created: 2020
- Seats: 1
- Party: Democratic Party
- Member: Kang Jun-hyeon
- Created from: Sejong

Sejong B (Korean: 세종특별자치시 을) is a constituency of the National Assembly of South Korea. The constituency consists of Sejong City excluding the southern portion. As of 2024, 129,759 eligible voters were registered in the constituency.

== History ==
Sejong B was created ahead of the 2020 South Korean legislative election from the former Sejong constituency as a result of an increase in the area's voter population. The constituency has been represented by Democratic Party member Kang Jun-hyeon since its creation.

== Boundaries ==
The constituency consists of the neighborhoods of Areum-dong, Jongchon-dong, Goun-dong, the townships of Yeondong-myeon, Yeonseo-myeon, Jeonui-myeon, Jeondong-myeon, Sojeong-myeon, and the town of Jochiwon-eup.

== List of members of the National Assembly ==
Election	Member	Party	Dates	Notes
2020	Kang Jun-hyeon	Democratic	2020-present	Deputy Mayor of Sejong City (2016–2018)
2024	Kang Jun-hyeon	Democratic	2020-present	Deputy Mayor of Sejong City (2016–2018)

== Election results ==
=== 2024 ===
Legislative Election 2024: Sejong B
Party	Candidate	Votes	%	±%
Democratic	Kang Jun-hyeon	49,621	56.19	▼1.77
People Power	Lee Jun-bae	33,148	37.54	▼2.14
Reform	Lee Tae-hwan	4,104	4.64	new
Independent	Shin Yong-woo	1,250	1.41	new
Korea National	Park Jong-chae	174	0.19	new
Rejected ballots		1,052	–	
Turnout		89,349	68.85	▲2.63
Registered electors		129,759		
Democratic hold		Swing		

=== 2020 ===
Legislative Election 2020: Sejong B
Party	Candidate	Votes	%	±%
Democratic	Kang Jun-hyeon	46,002	57.96	–
United Future	Kim Byong-joon	31,495	39.68	–
Minsaeng	Chung Won-hee	1,182	1.48	–
National Revolutionary	Chung Tae-joon	683	0.86	–
Rejected ballots		977	–	–
Turnout		80,339	66.22	–
Registered electors		121,305		
Democratic win (new seat)				

== See also ==
- List of constituencies of the National Assembly of South Korea
