= Office for Government Policy Coordination Prime Minister's Secretariat =

- 국무총리비서실

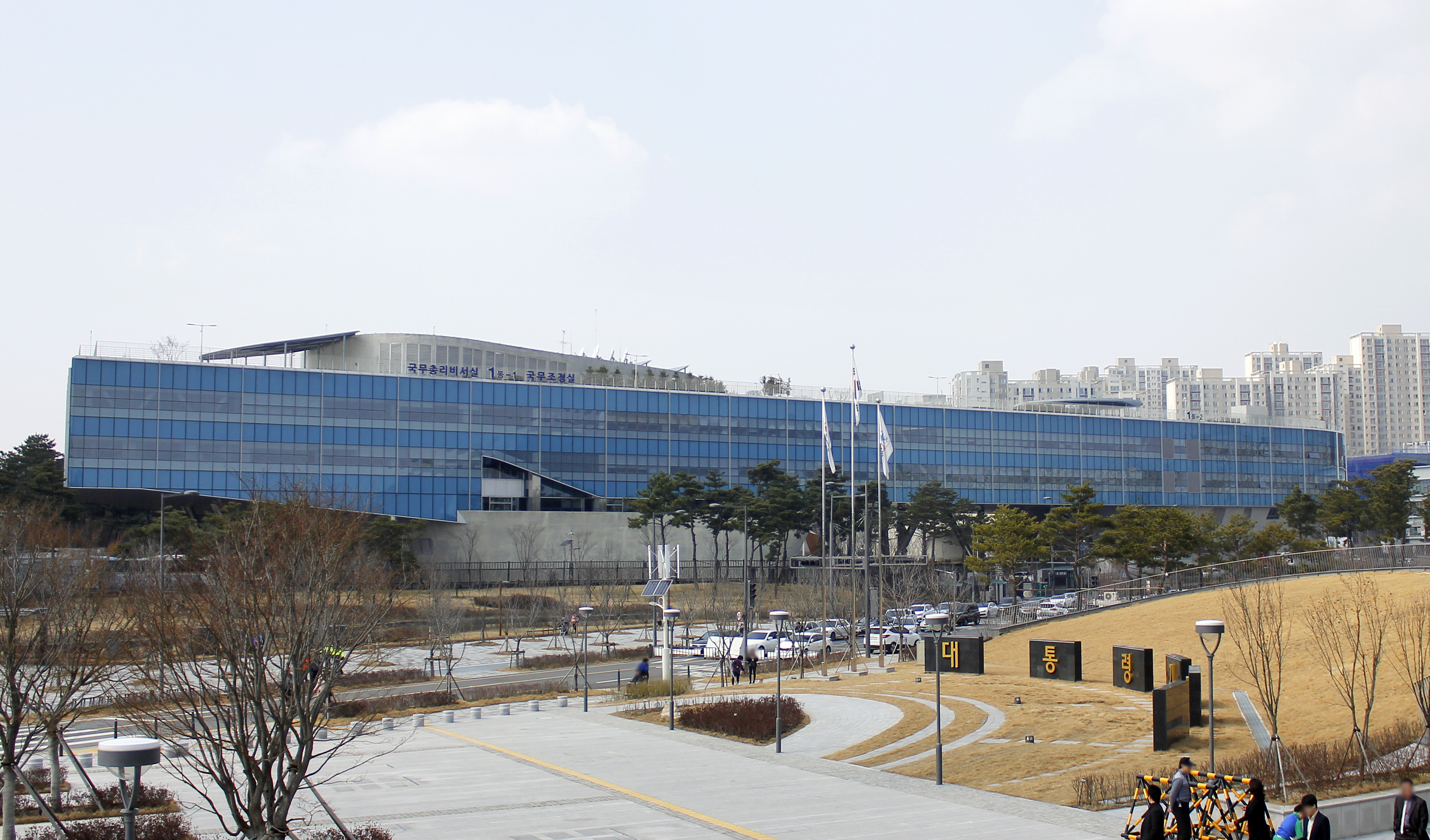

Agency overview
- Formed: 23 March 2013
- Jurisdiction: Prime Minister of South Korea
- Headquarters: Dasom-ro, Sejong City

Korean name
- Hangul: 국무총리비서실
- Hanja: 國務總理秘書室
- RR: Gungmuchongni biseosil
- MR: Kungmuch'ongni pisŏsil

Office for Government Policy Coordination Prime Minister's Secretariat (Korean: 국무총리비서실) is a central administrative agency of South Korea that assists the Prime Minister in the performance of his duties. The Director is appointed as a political appointee at the vice-ministerial level.

== History ==
The Office for Government Policy Coordination Prime Minister's Secretariat was established in accordance with the Organizational Structure of the Secretariat of the Prime Minister (국무총리비서실 직제) enacted in August 1960. It was abolished in 1962 and changed to the Secretariat of the Head of the Cabinet, but was re-established on December 17, 1963, under the Organizational Structure of the Secretariat of the Prime Minister of the Government Organization Act (정부조직법).

Following the reorganization of government organizations in February 2008, it was merged with the Office of Government Coordination and reorganized into the Office of the Prime Minister.
