= Kim Byeong-jun =

Kim Byeong-jun (김병준) or Kim Pyŏng-jun may refer to:

- Kim Byong-joon (born 1954), South Korean political scientist
- Kim Byeong-jun (speed skater) (born 1988), South Korean short track speed skater
- Kim Byoung-jun (born 1991), South Korean athlete
