= Government Complex, Sejong =

Government building in Sejong, South Korea

Government Complex Sejong
- Interactive map of the Government Complex Sejong area
- Alternative names: Central Government Complex

General information
- Status: Used as government buildings for some of Ministries of South Korea
- Type: Government office complex
- Location: DASOM 2-RO, Sejong, South Korea
- Coordinates: 36°30′17″N 127°15′55″E
- Construction started: December 2008
- Completed: November 5, 2014
- Cost: 1.731 trillion won

Technical details
- Structural system: Reinforced concrete and steel
- Floor area: 629,145m^{2}

Korean name
- Hangul: 정부세종청사
- Hanja: 政府世宗廳舍
- RR: Jeongbu Sejong cheongsa
- MR: Chŏngbu Sejong ch'ŏngsa

The Government Complex Sejong (Korean: 정부세종청사) is a government building built to create a multi-functional administrative city by relocating central administrative agencies to the non-metropolitan area for the purpose of decentralization, balanced development, and overcrowding in the metropolitan area.

== Features ==
There is no separation between departments or individuals, and desks are arranged together regardless of position. It is equipped with an employee lounge, multipurpose communication space, and conference room.

There is a roof garden inspired by Sunseongnori, Korea's Traditional Play, it was listed in the Guinness Book of World Records in 2016 as the world's largest (3.6 km) garden with 15 buildings connected.

== See also ==
- Government Complex, Daejeon
- Government of South Korea
- Ministry of the Interior and Safety (South Korea)
- Sejong City
