= Jeondong-myeon =

Township of Sejong City, South Korea

- Hangul: 전동면
- Hanja: 全東面
- RR: Jeondong-myeon
- MR: Chŏndong-myŏn

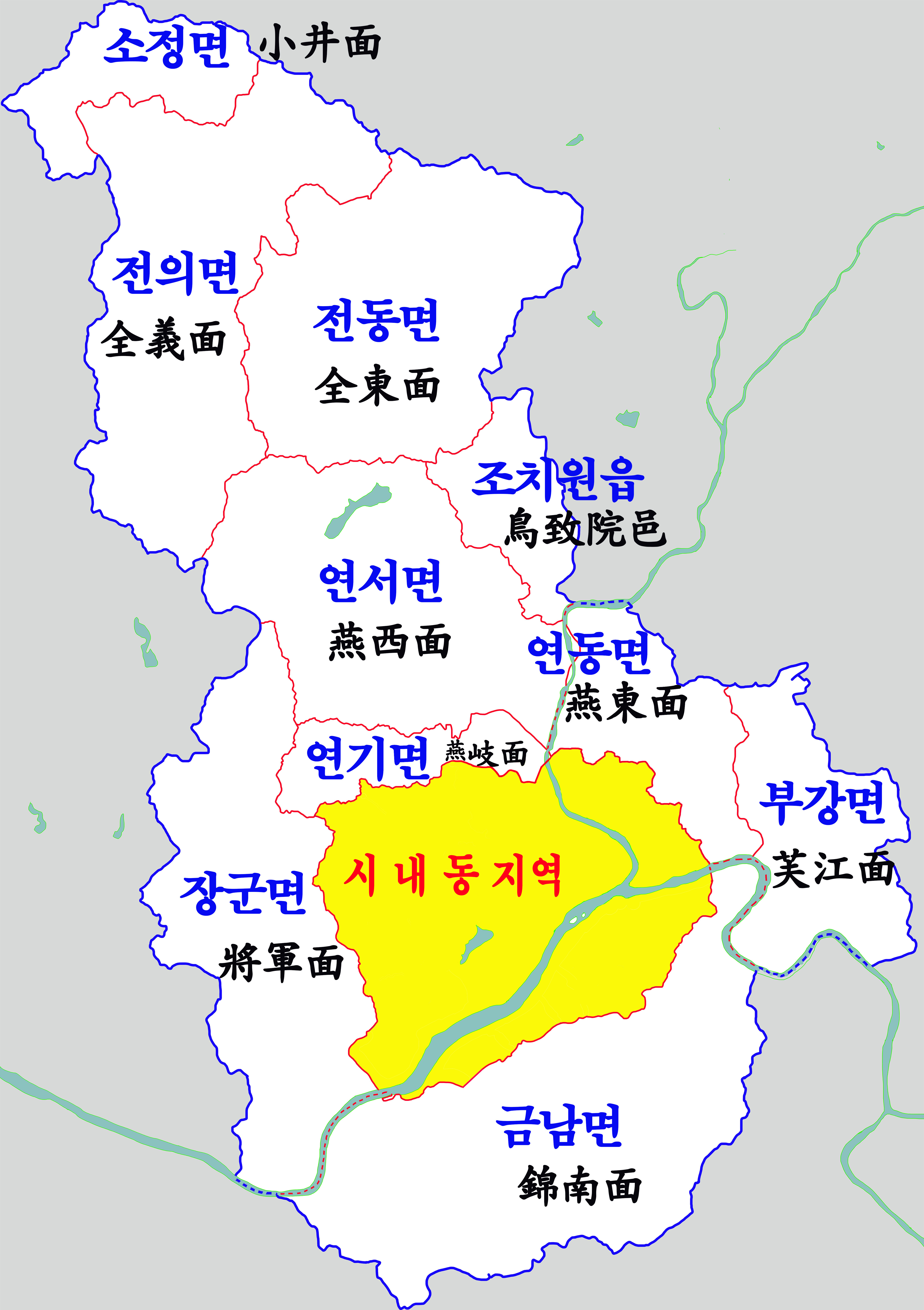
Map of Sejong City

Jeondong-myeon (Korean: 전동면) is a township of Sejong City, South Korea.
