= Saerom-dong =

- Neighborhood
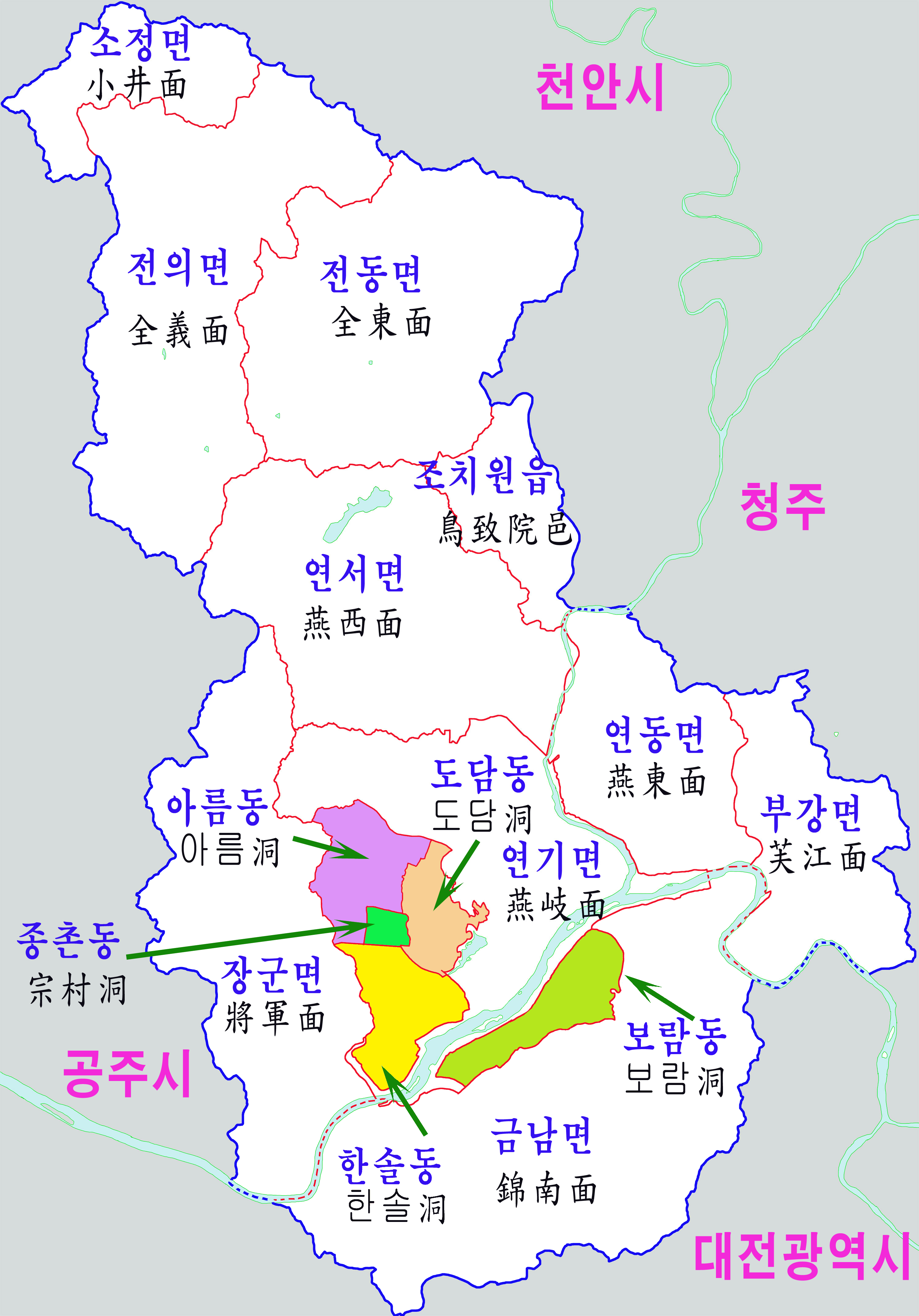
- Map of Sejong City
- Country: South Korea
- Provincial level: Sejong City

Population (2017)
  - Total: 34,844
- Time zone: UTC+9 (Korea Standard Time)

Korean name
- Hangul: 새롬동
- Hanja: 새롬洞
- RR: Saerom-dong
- MR: Saerom-dong

Saerom-dong (Korean: 새롬동) is a neighborhood of Sejong City, South Korea.
