= Boram-dong =

- neighborhood
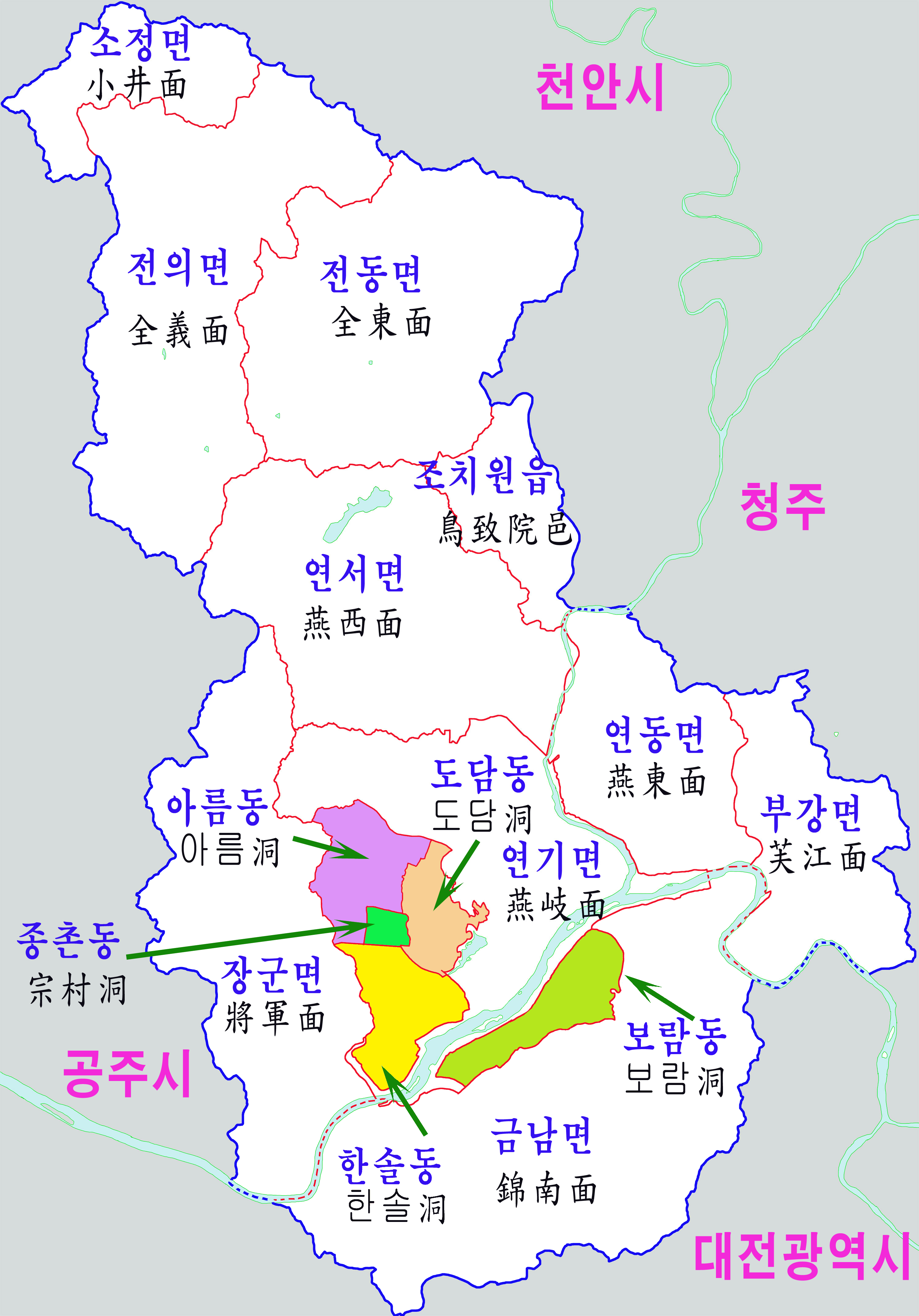
- Map of Sejong City
- Country: South Korea
- Provincial level: Sejong City

Area
  - Total: 7.28 km^{2} (2.81 sq mi)

Population (2017)
  - Total: 25,937
  - Density: 3,560/km^{2} (9,230/sq mi)
- Time zone: UTC+9 (Korea Standard Time)

Korean name
- Hangul: 보람동
- Hanja: 보람洞
- RR: Boram-dong
- MR: Poram-dong

Boram-dong (Korean: 보람동) is a neighborhood of Sejong City, South Korea.
