= Dodam-dong =

Neighborhood of Sejong City, South Korea

- Hangul: 도담동
- Hanja: 도담洞
- RR: Dodam-dong
- MR: Todam-dong

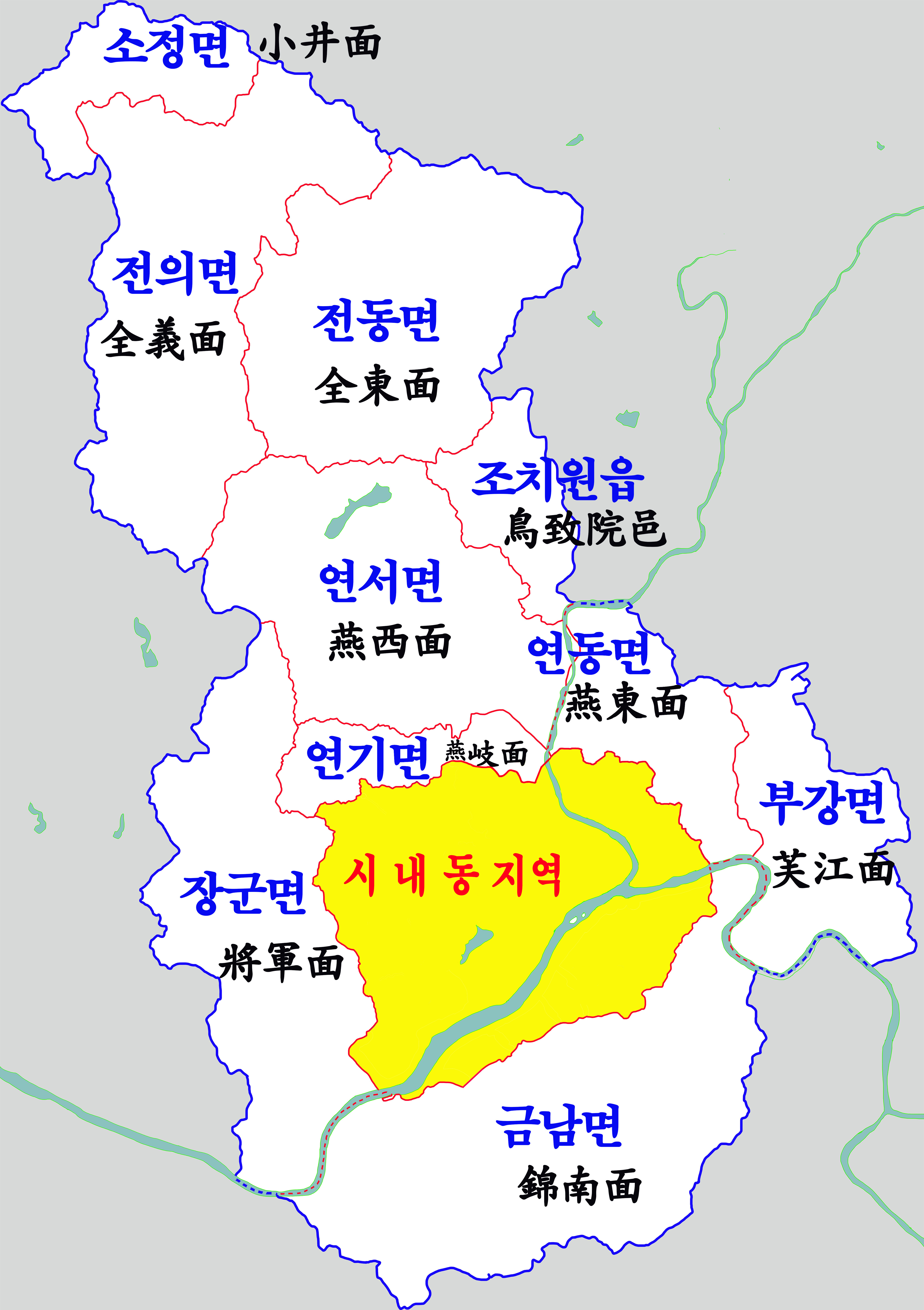
Map of Sejong City

Dodam-dong (Korean: 도담동) is a neighborhood of Sejong City, South Korea.
