= Bugang-myeon =

Township of Sejong City, South Korea

- Hangul: 부강면
- Hanja: 芙江面
- RR: Bugang-myeon
- MR: Pugang-myŏn

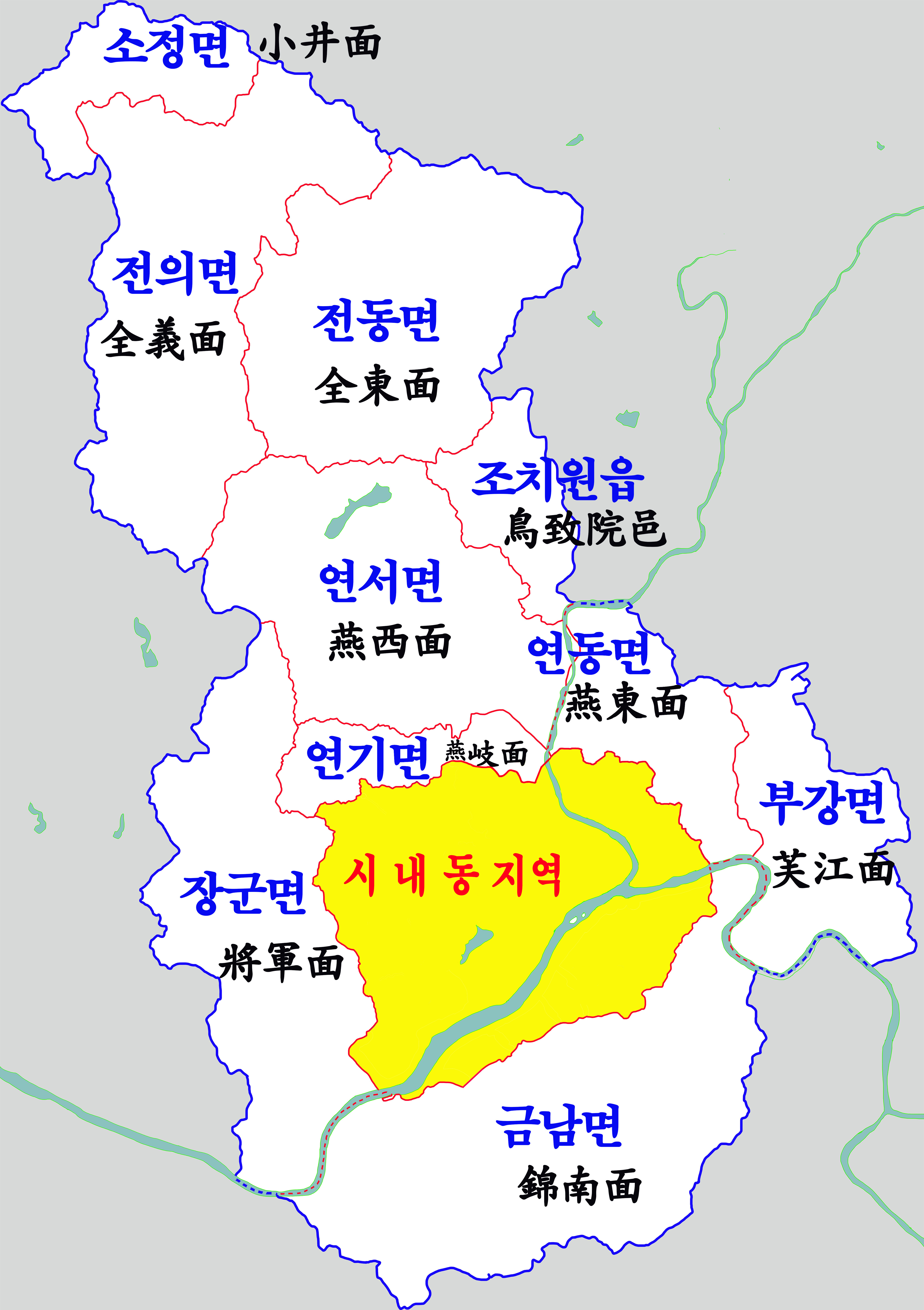
Map of Sejong City

Bugang-myeon (Korean: 부강면) is a township of Sejong City, South Korea.
