= Hansol-dong =

- Hangul: 한솔동
- Hanja: 한솔洞
- RR: Hansol-dong
- MR: Hansol-tong

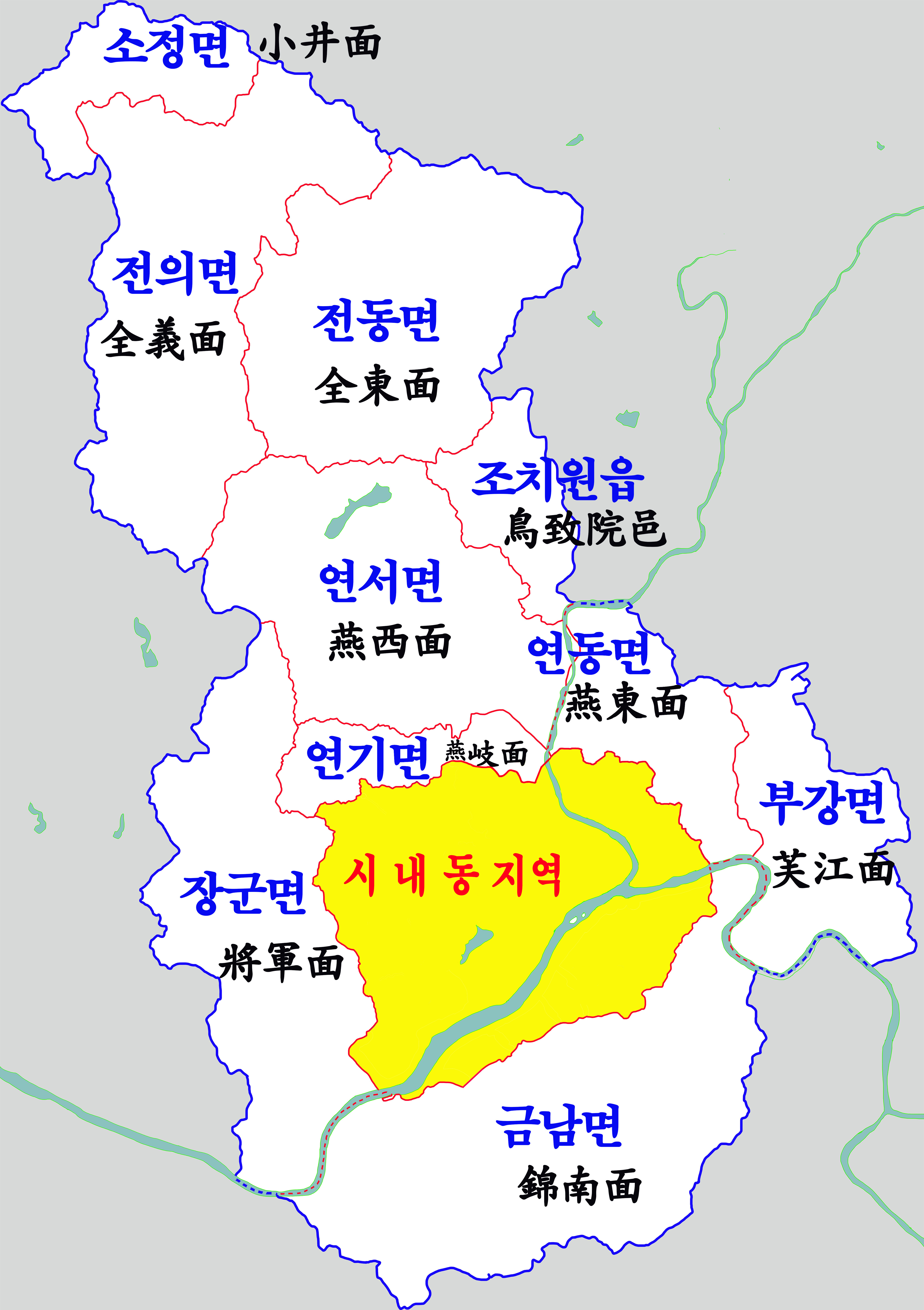
Map of Sejong City

Hansol-dong (Korean: 한솔동) is part of Sejong City, South Korea. It was the first place government officials lived in Sejong after the city was constructed to serve as the de facto administrative capital of South Korea. Hansol-dong consists mainly of the Cheotmauel (Korean: First Village, from its residential use) Apartment Complex. Others began to reside and especially work in the ward soon thereafter; most came from Daejeon.

Hansol-dong has an E-mart, a large shopping mall, with other recreational spaces under construction. While the settlement and its area are generally new historically, workers building local housing discovered evidence of a tomb belonging to a local chieftain from the 5th or 6th century AD.
