= Jochiwon =

- Eup
- Panoramic view of Jochiwon

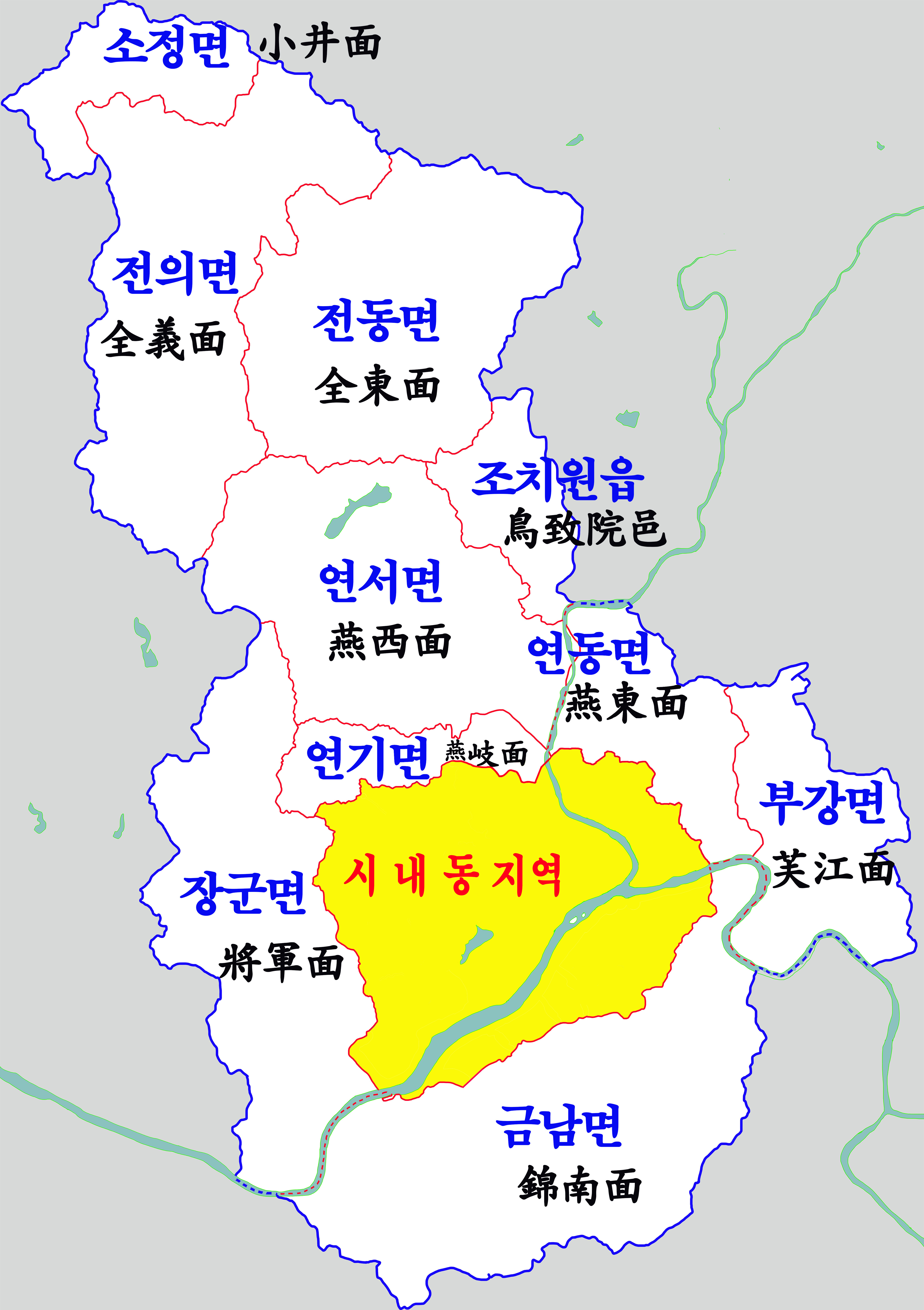
- Coordinates: 36.6028°N 127.3042°E
- Country: South Korea

Area
  - Total: 13.69 km^{2} (5.29 sq mi)

Population (2016)
  - Total: 46,452
  - Density: 3,393/km^{2} (8,788/sq mi)

Korean name
- Hangul: 조치원읍
- Hanja: 鳥致院邑
- RR: Jochiwon-eup
- MR: Choch'iwŏn-ŭp

Jochiwon (Korean: 조치원읍) is a town located in Sejong City, South Korea.

Jochiwon was the site of the Battle of Chochiwon. As of 2011, Jochiwon has a large foreign community consisting of native English speakers considering its rather small size and population. This is due to the existence of two major universities: Hong-ik University and Korea University Korea University Sejong Campus, both satellite campuses. In addition to the universities, there are numerous public schools.

Jochiwon is centrally located on Korail's Gyeongbu line. It is a 90-minute ride on Mugunghwa-ho to Seoul and trains run approximately every 30 minutes. Just outside Jochiwon town limits is the town of Osong home to Osong Station, a station with KTX service.

Padak, a variety of Korean fried chicken topped with scallion, originated from a traditional market in this area. The dish would gradually gain popularity nationwide, being offered in fried chicken restaurants.

== Notable people ==
- Song So-hee; Gugak, Minyo musician
