= Sodam-dong =

- neighborhood
- Country: South Korea
- Provincial level: Sejong City
- Time zone: UTC+9 (Korea Standard Time)

Korean name
- Hangul: 소담동
- Hanja: 소담洞
- RR: Sodam-dong
- MR: Sodam-dong

Sodam-dong (Korean: 소담동) is a neighborhood of Sejong City, South Korea.
