= Jongchon-dong =

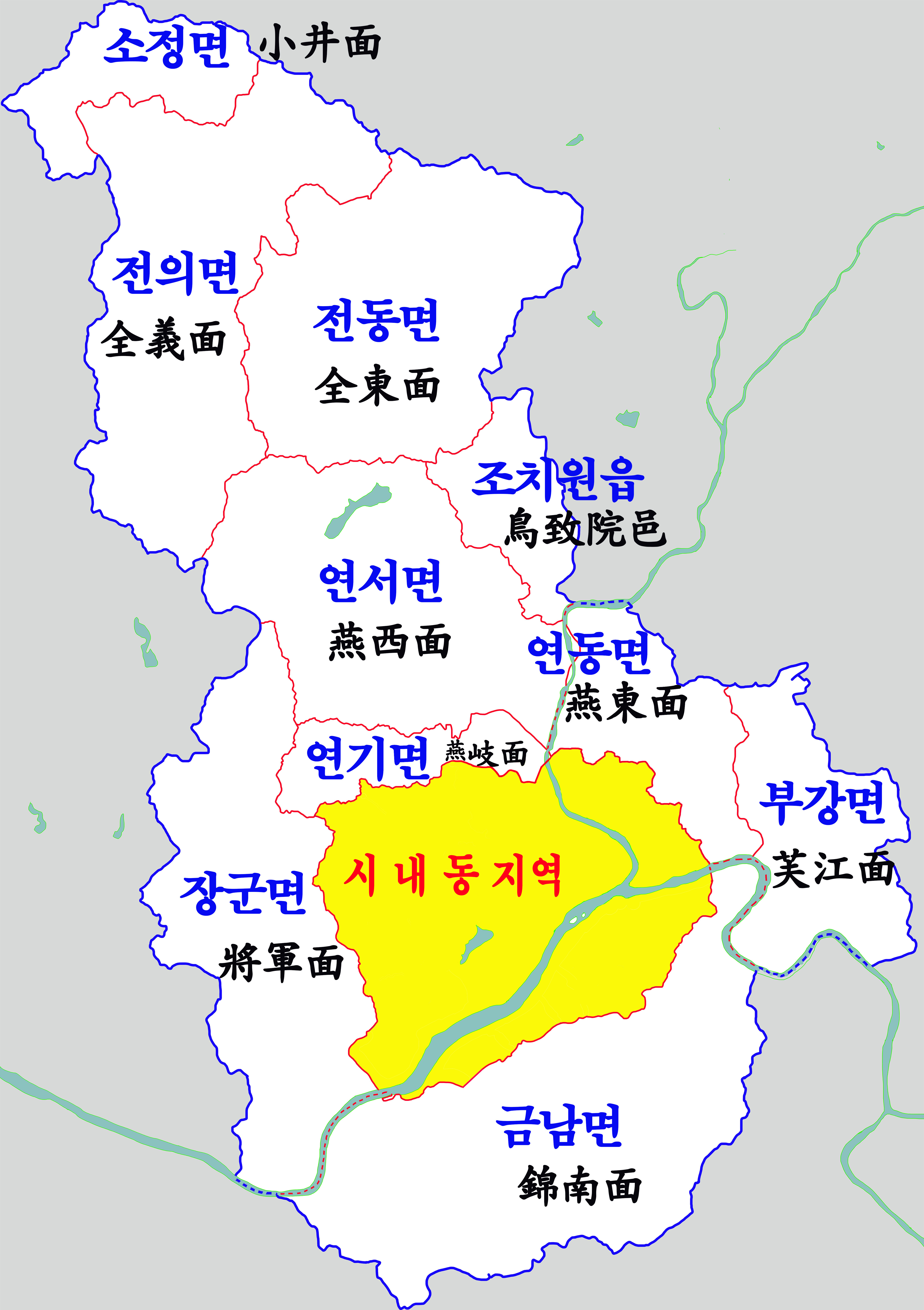
- Jongchon-dong is the green square shown within Sejong City
- Country: South Korea

Area
  - Total: 1.15 km^{2} (0.44 sq mi)

Population (2016)
  - Total: 29,622
  - Density: 25,800/km^{2} (66,700/sq mi)

Korean name
- Hangul: 종촌동
- Hanja: 宗村洞
- RR: Jongchon-dong
- MR: Chongch'on-dong

Jongchon-dong (Korean: 종촌동) is a borough (dong) of Sejong City, South Korea.
