= Yeonseo-myeon =

Township in South Korea

- Hangul: 연서면
- Hanja: 燕西面
- RR: Yeonseo-myeon
- MR: Yŏnsŏ-myŏn

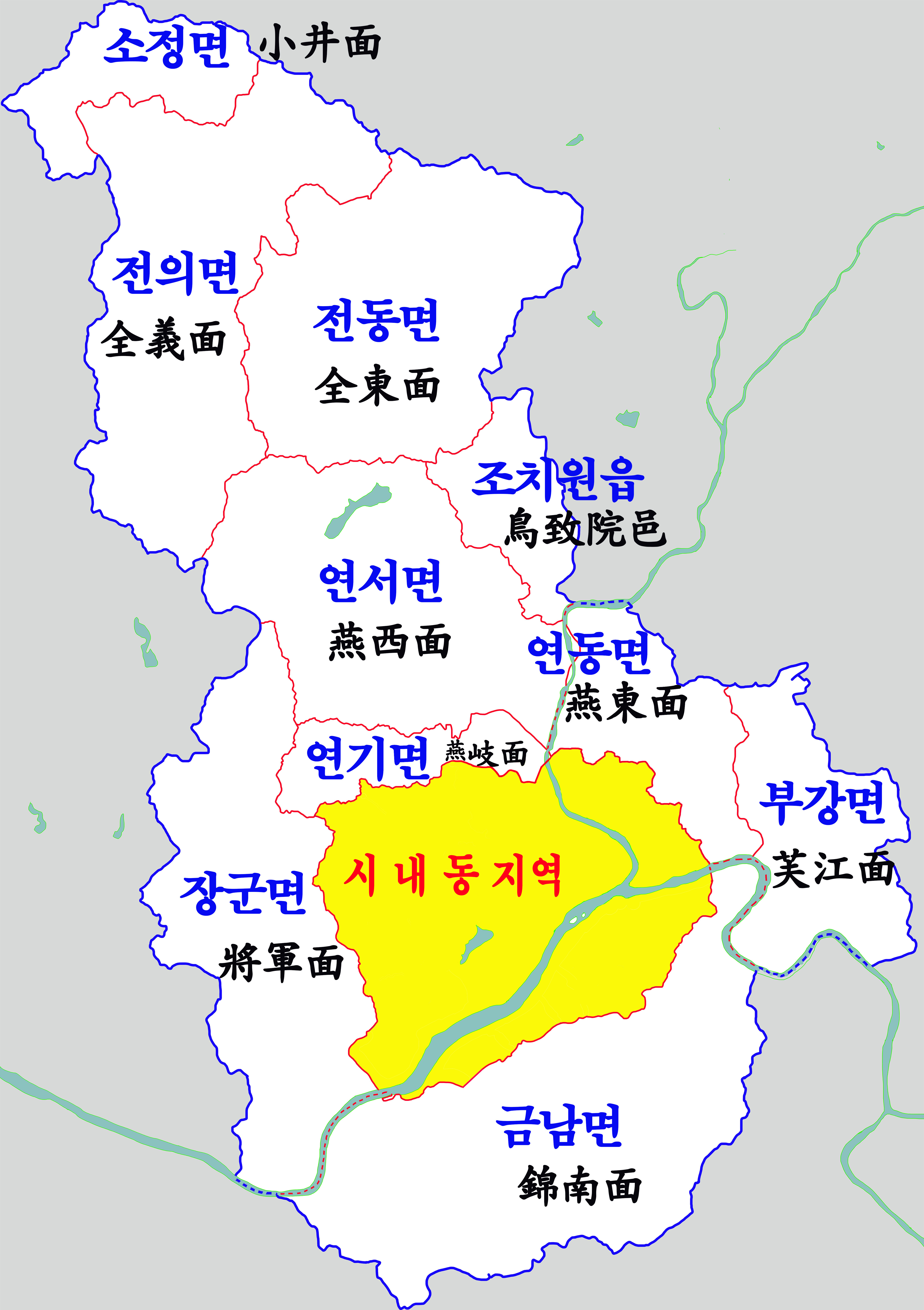
Map of Sejong City

Yeonseo-myeon (Korean: 연서면) is a township of Sejong City, South Korea.
