= Goun-dong =

- neighborhood
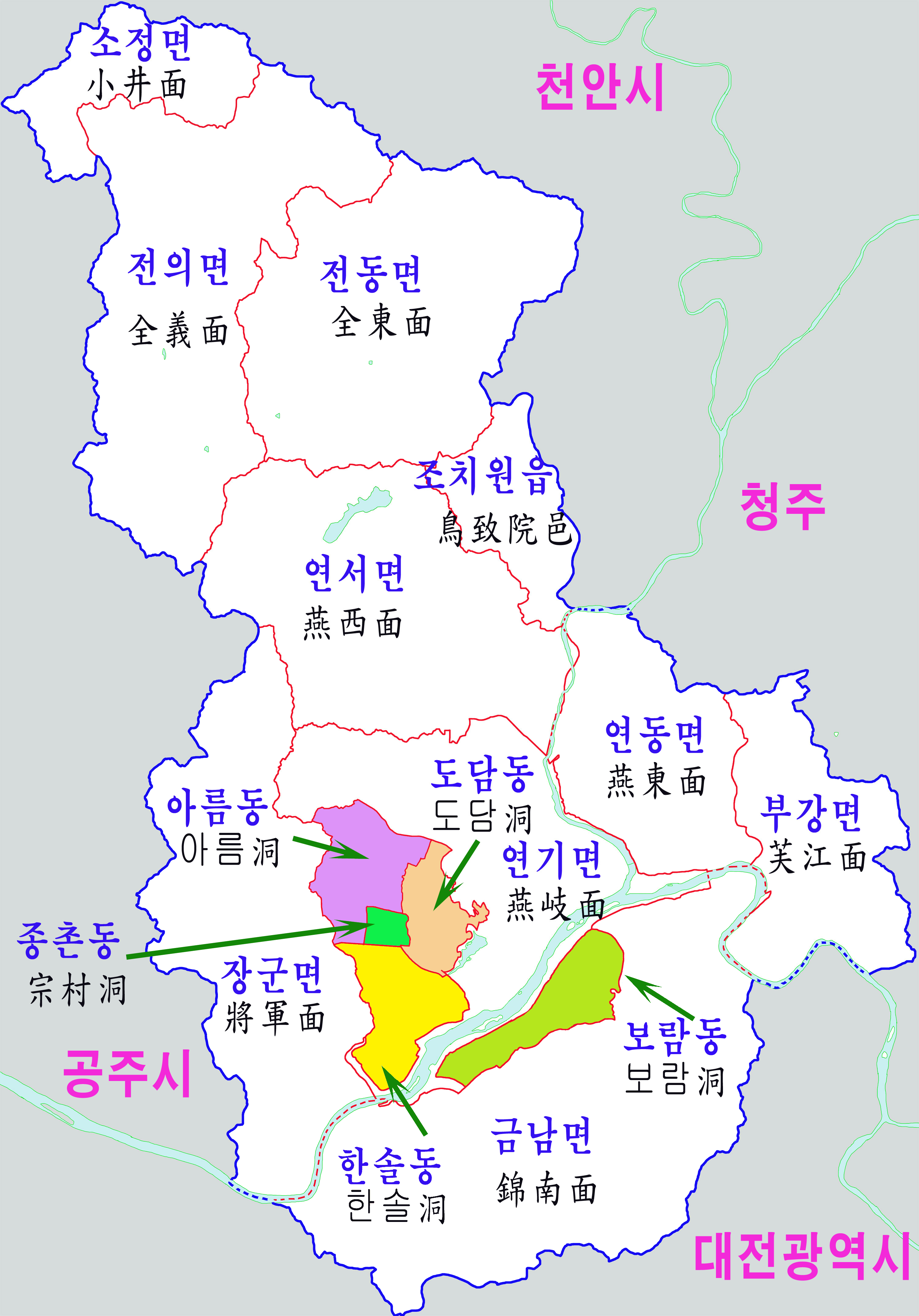
- Map of Sejong City
- Country: South Korea
- Provincial level: Sejong City
- Administrative divisions: 20 ri

Area
  - Total: 5.35 km^{2} (2.07 sq mi)

Population (2017)
  - Total: 26,358
  - Density: 4,930/km^{2} (12,800/sq mi)
- Time zone: UTC+9 (Korea Standard Time)

Korean name
- Hangul: 고운동
- Hanja: 고운洞
- RR: Goun-dong
- MR: Koun-dong

Goun-dong (Korean: 고운동) is a neighborhood of Sejong City, South Korea.
