= Daepyeong-dong =

- neighborhood
- Interactive map of Daepyeong-dong
- Coordinates: 35.842°N 128.730°E
- Country: South Korea
- Provincial level: Sejong City
- Time zone: UTC+9 (Korea Standard Time)

Korean name
- Hangul: 대평동
- Hanja: 大平洞
- RR: Daepyeong-dong
- MR: Taep'yŏng-dong

Daepyeong-dong (Korean: 대평동) is dong (neighborhood) of Sejong City, South Korea.
