= Yeondong-myeon =

Township of Sejong City, South Korea

- Hangul: 연동면
- Hanja: 燕東面
- RR: Yeondong-myeon
- MR: Yŏndong-myŏn

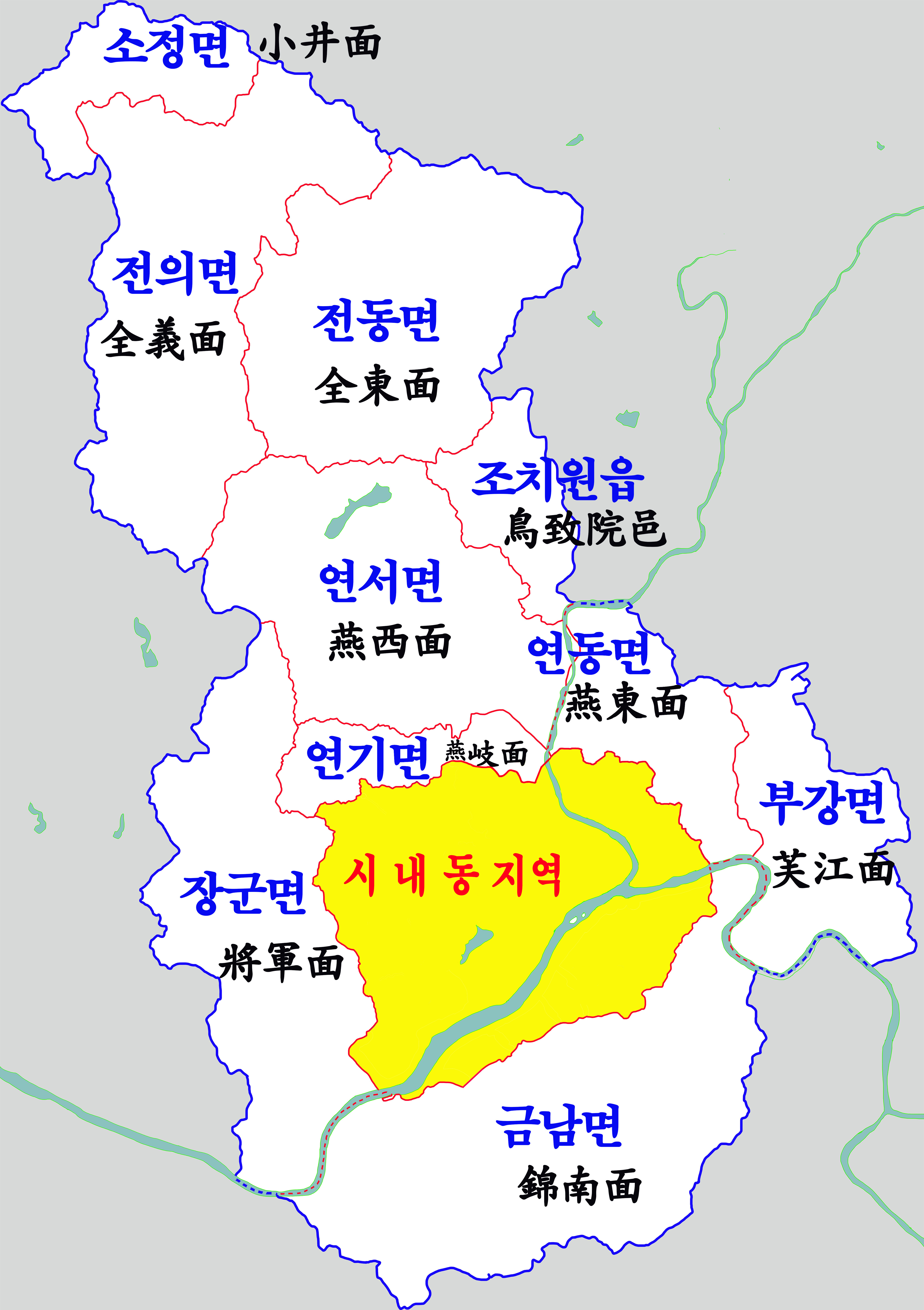
Map of Sejong City

Yeondong-myeon (Korean: 연동면) is a township of Sejong City, South Korea.
