= Sejong City =

De facto administrative capital of South Korea

Sejong
- Special self-governing city
- Sejong Special Self-Governing City
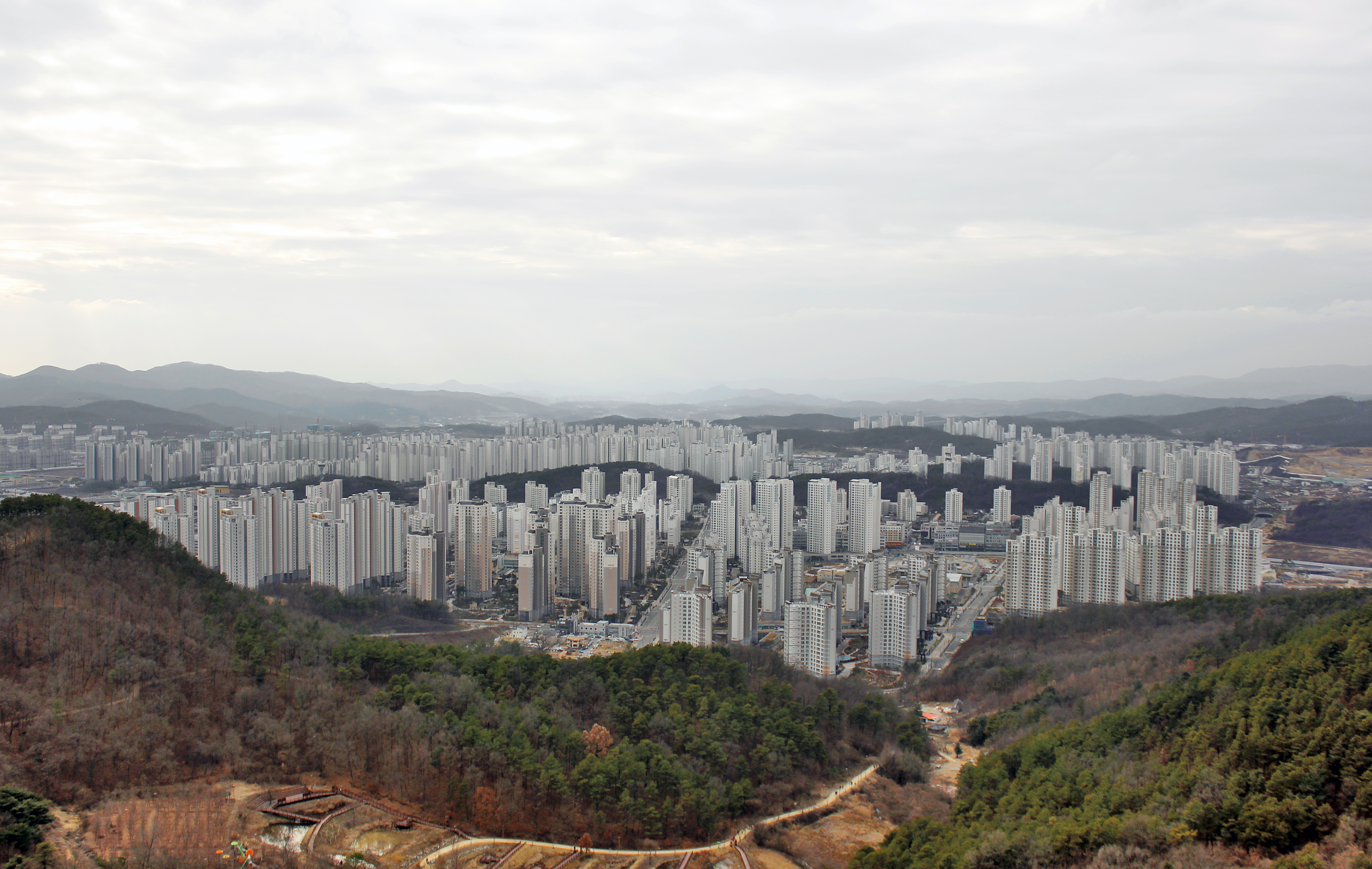
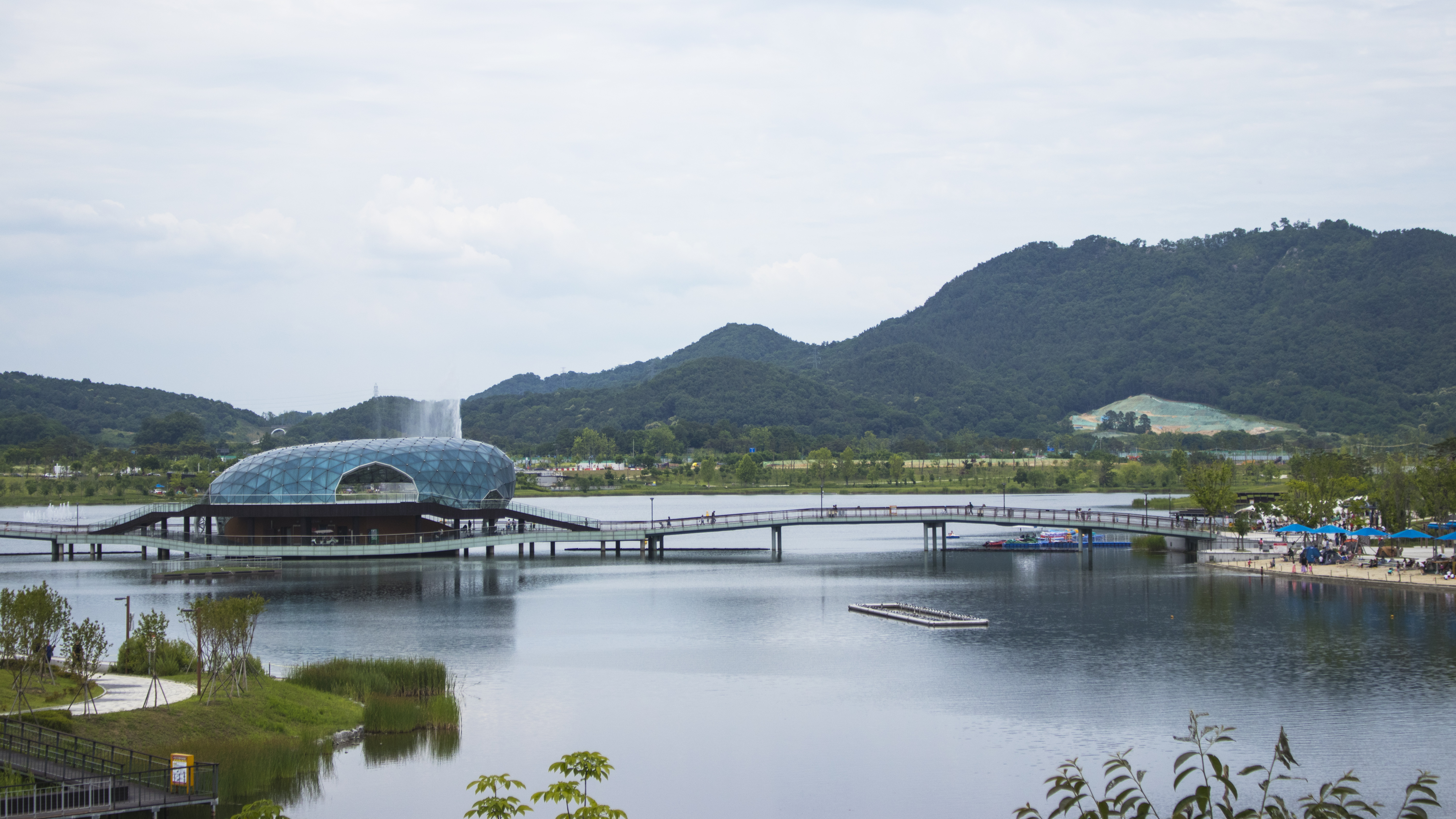
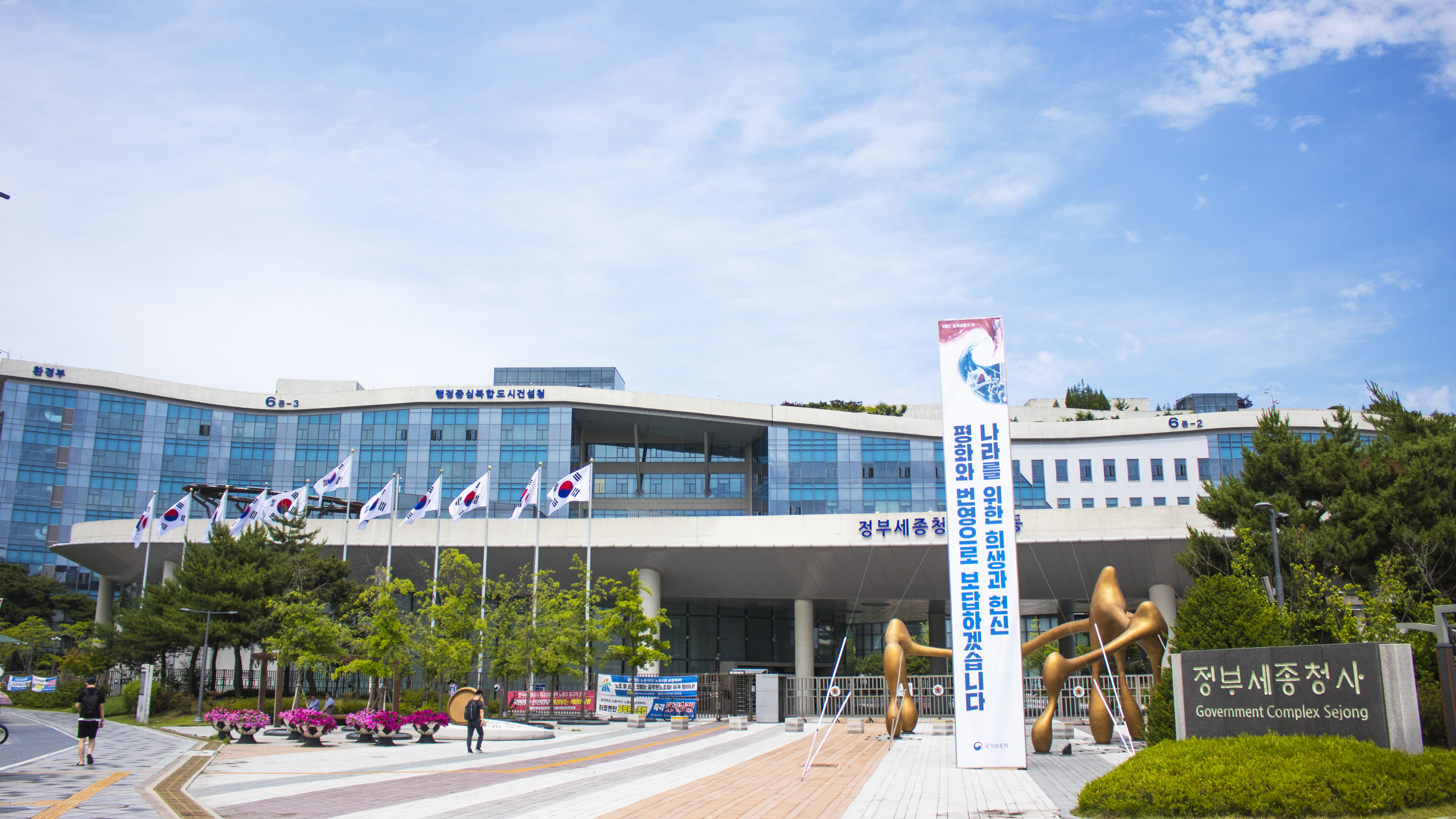
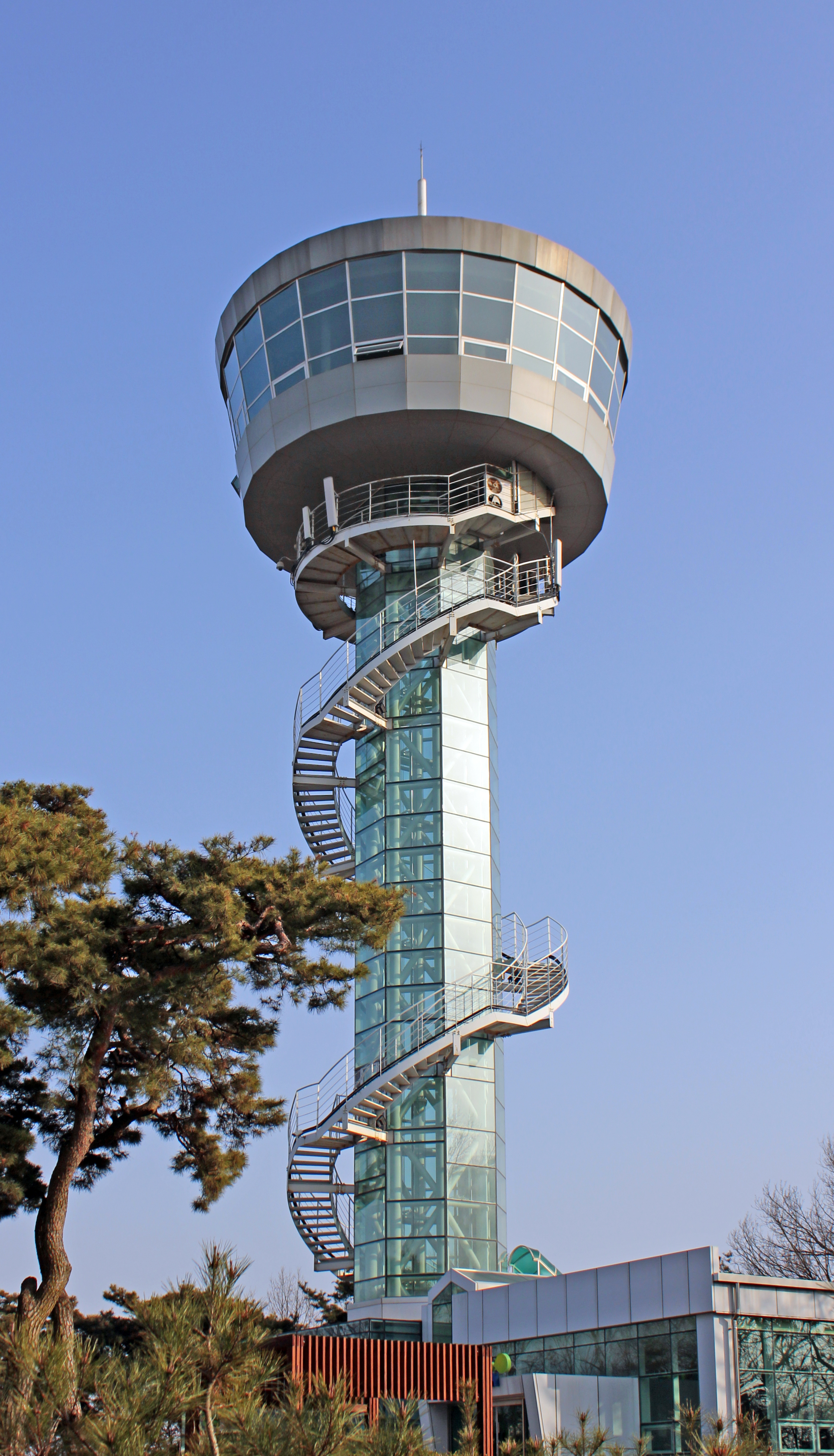
- Sejong City Sejong Lake Park Government Complex Sejong Milmaru Observatory

- Flag Logo
- Coordinates: 36°29′13″N 127°16′56″E
- Country: South Korea
- Region: Hoseo
- Established: 2012
- Neighbourhood Town Townships: 12; 1; 9

Government
  - Type: Mayor–Council
  - Mayor: Cho Sang-ho (Democratic)
  - Body: Sejong City Council

Area
  - Total: 465.23 km^{2} (179.63 sq mi)

Population (July 2024)
  - Total: 394,630
  - Density: 848.2/km^{2} (2,197/sq mi)
  - Dialect: Chungcheong

GDP (Nominal, 2023)
  - Total: KRW 17 trillion (US$ 14 billion)
  - Per capita: US$ 37,875
- Time zone: UTC+9 (Korea Standard Time)
- Area code: +82-44
- ISO 3166 code: KR-50
- Website: Official website (English)

Korean name
- Hangul: 세종특별자치시
- Hanja: 世宗特別自治市
- RR: Sejong-teukbyeoljachisi
- MR: Sejong-t'ŭkpyŏljach'isi

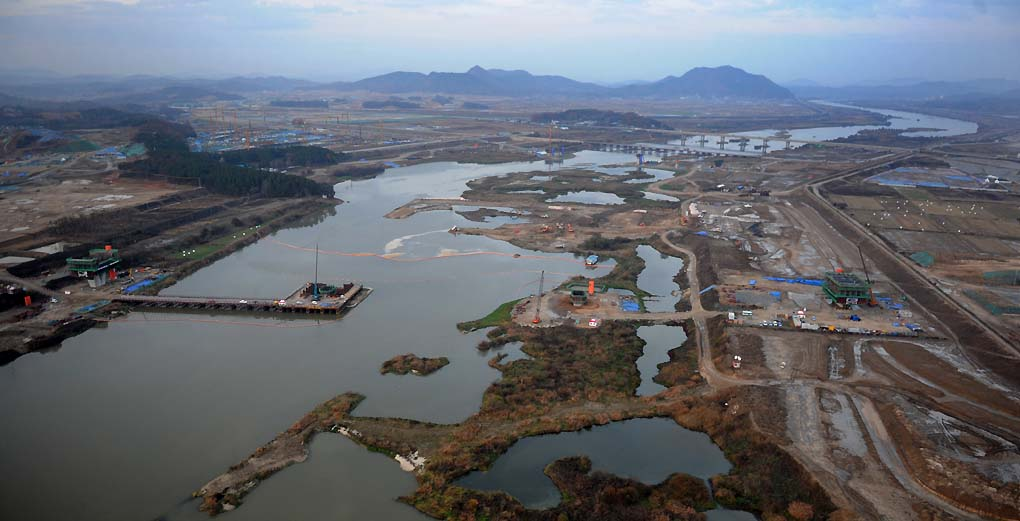
Construction site in Sejong, November 2009

Sejong or Sejong City (Korean: 세종; Korean: [seːdʑoŋ]), officially Sejong Special Self-Governing City (세종특별자치시), is a special self-governing city and the de facto administrative capital of South Korea.

Sejong was founded in 2007 as the new planned capital of South Korea created mostly from parts of South Chungcheong Province and some parts of North Chungcheong Province in order to ease congestion in South Korea's current capital and largest city, Seoul, and to encourage investment in the country's central region. Since 2012, the government of South Korea has relocated numerous ministries and agencies to Sejong, but many still reside in other cities, primarily in Seoul, where the National Assembly and many important government bodies remain.

Sejong has a population of 351,007 as of 2020 and covers a geographic area of 465.23 km^{2} (179.63 sq mi), making it the least-populous and smallest first-level administrative division in South Korea. Sejong is located in the west-central Hoseo region, bordering South Chungcheong to the west, Daejeon to the south, and North Chungcheong to the east.

The construction of the city is expected to be completed in 2030, at which time 500,000 people are expected to live there.

== Name ==
Sejong was named in honor of King Sejong the Great, the fourth king of the Joseon Dynasty and creator of the Korean alphabet, Hangul. The city was formed by combining Yeongi County, the county of South Chungcheong Province from which the majority of the city's territory was ceded, and other counties.

== History ==
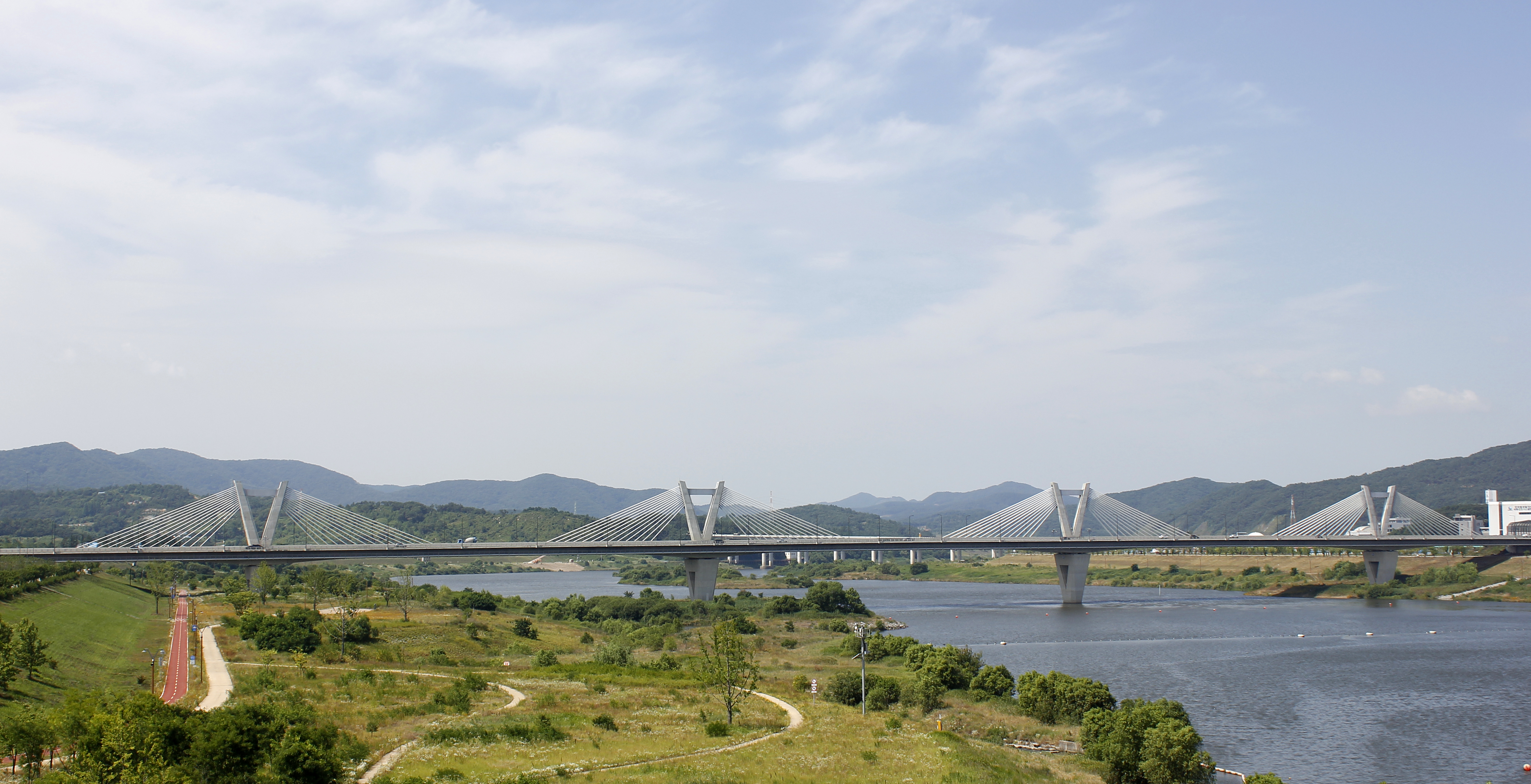
Haknaraegyo Bridge, 2016

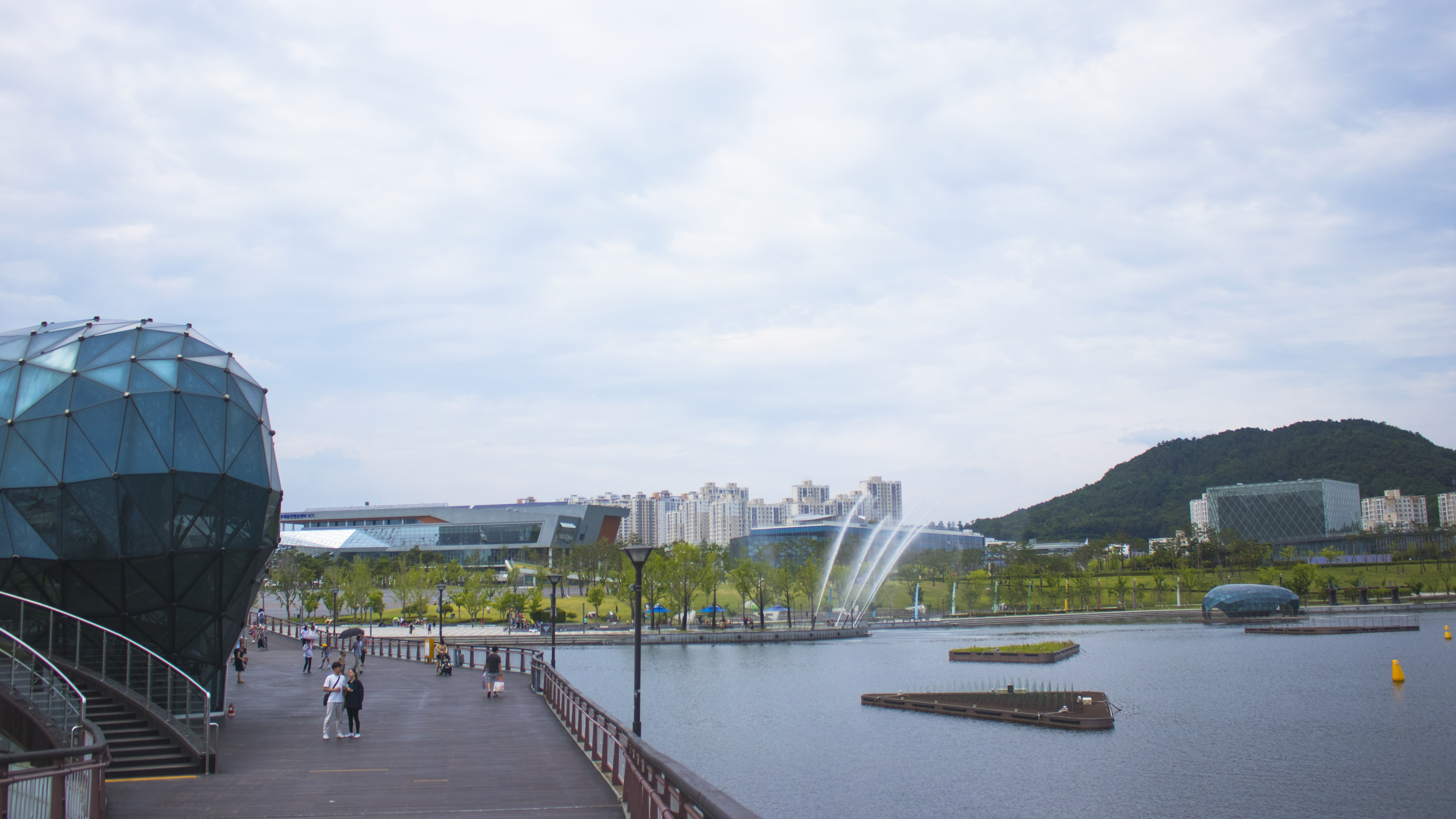
Sejong Lake Park

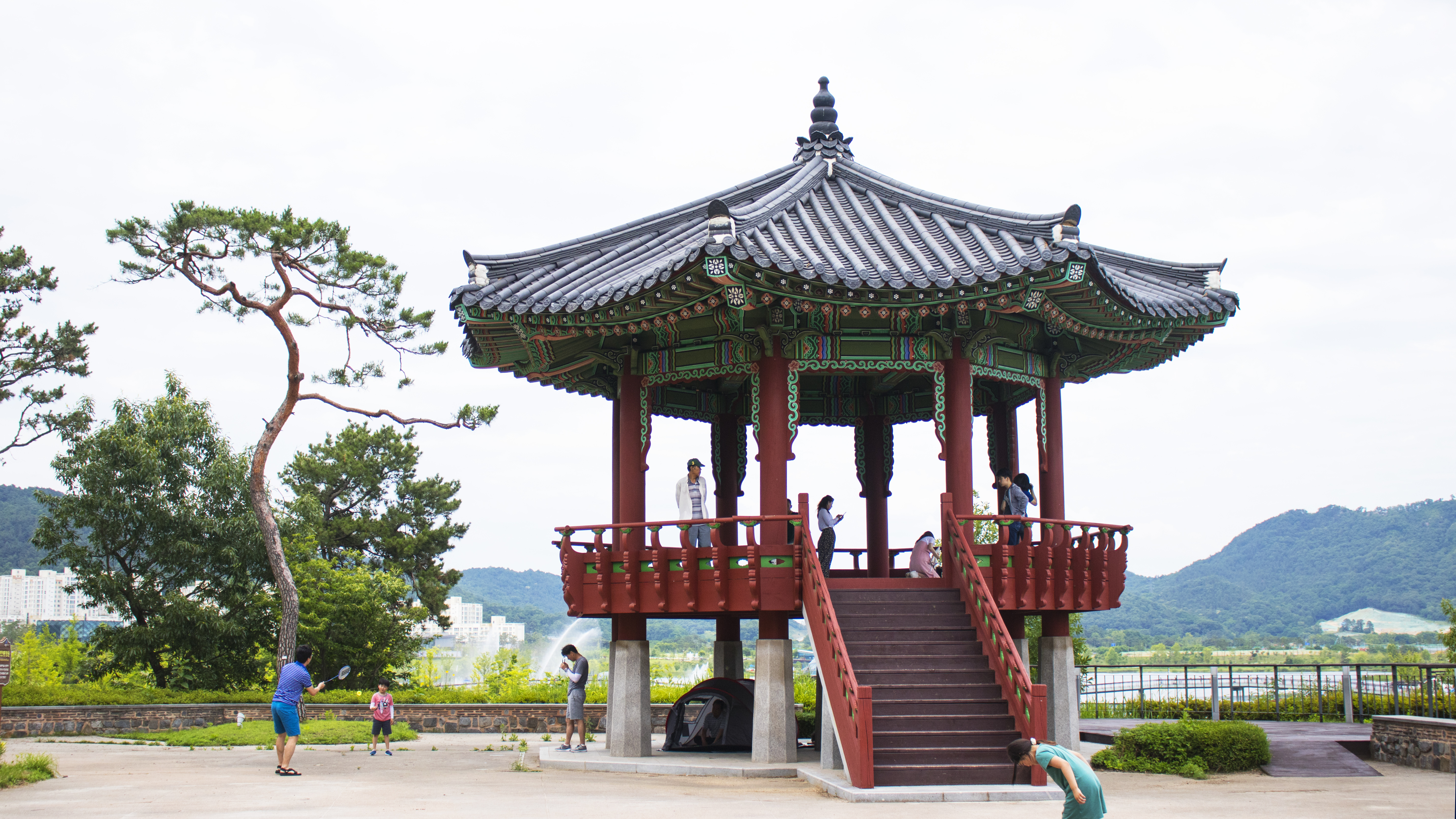
Sejong Lake Park

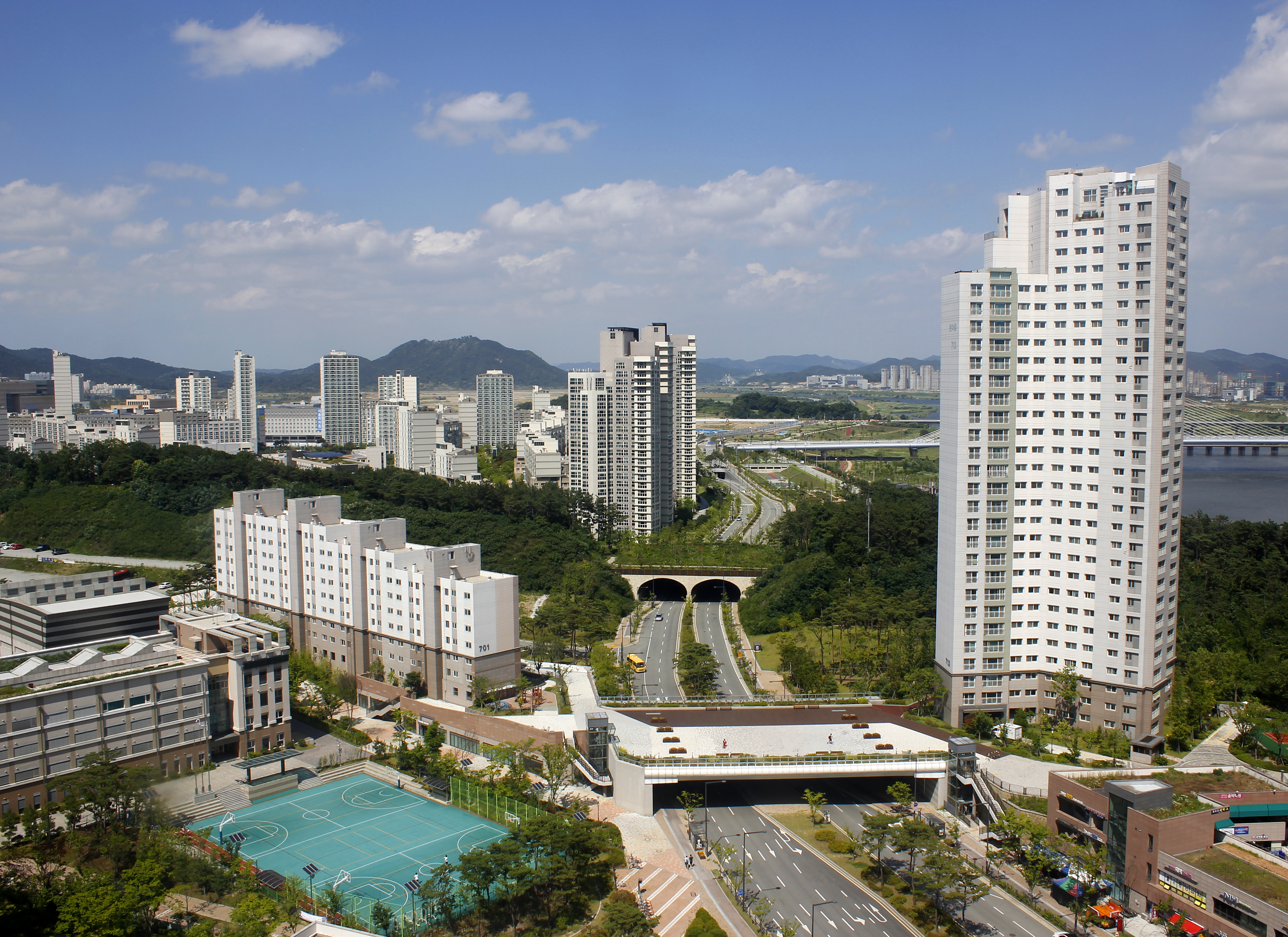
Cityscape of Hansol-dong, Sejong, 2015

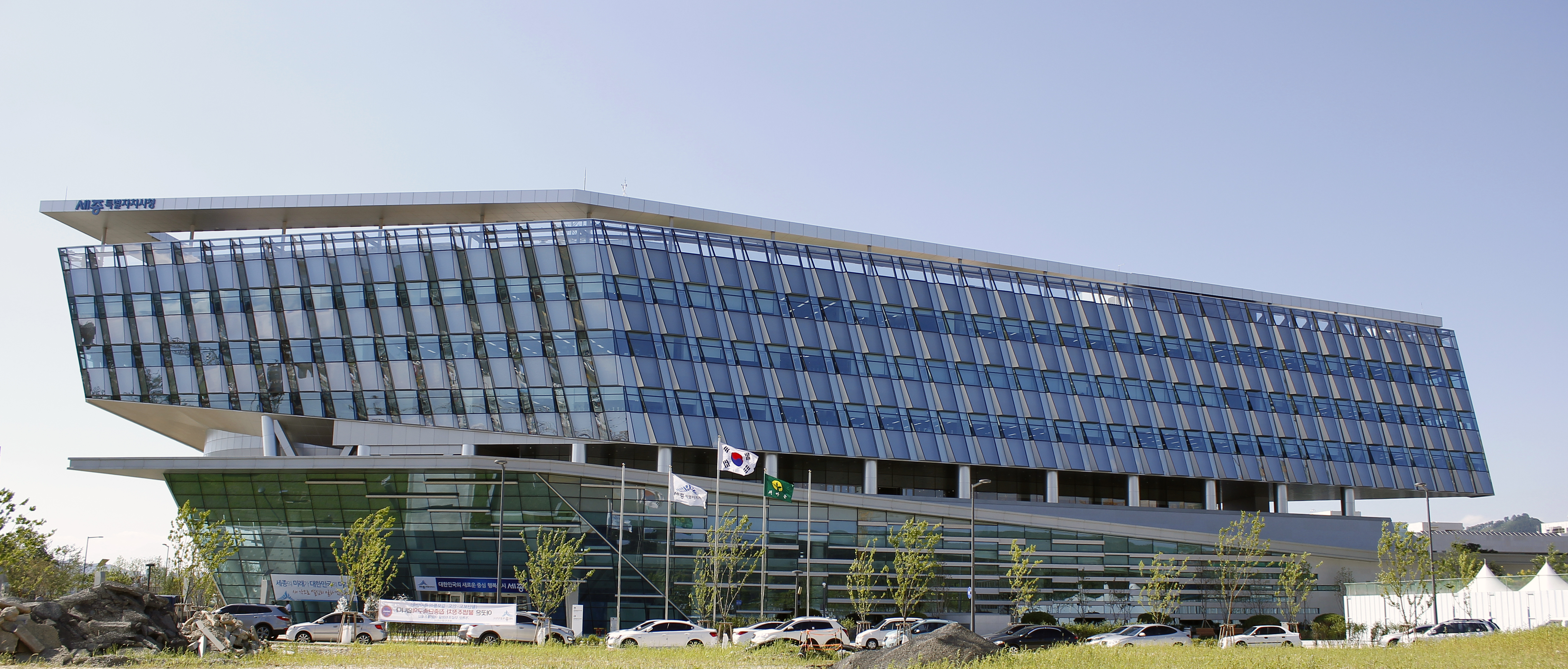
Sejong City Hall

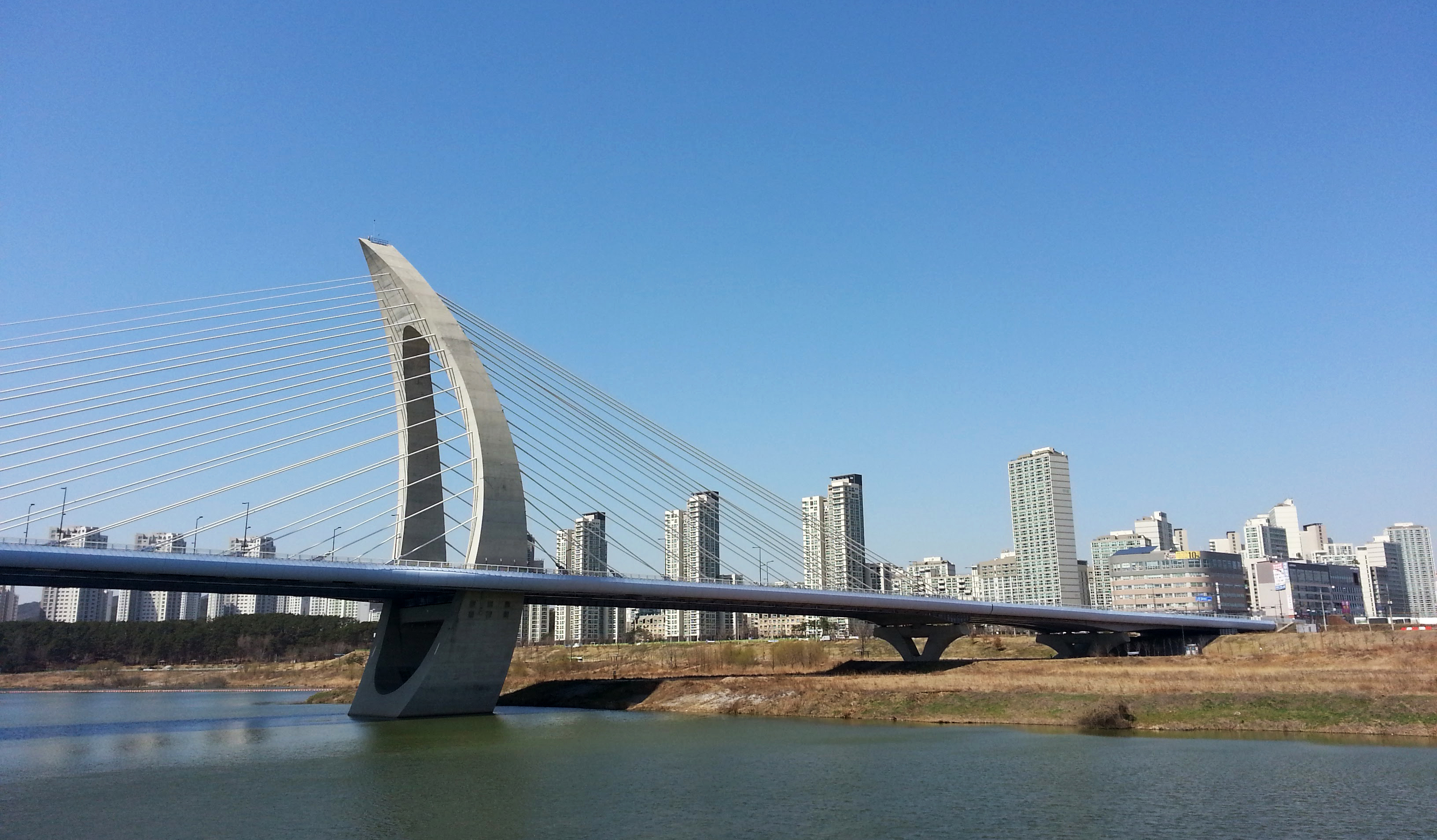
Handuri Bridge

In 2003, then-President Roh Moo-hyun sought to relocate the national capital of South Korea from the metropolitan city of Seoul to a new multifunctional administrative city in the center of the country. The goal was to reduce the influence and dominance of Seoul on national governance and economics, whilst promoting the regional development of other areas of the country. According to the former Interior Minister Maeng Hyung-gyu in 2012, "Sejong is a symbol of the country's efforts toward more balanced regional development," helping to decongest Seoul and spur investment in the country's central region.

In October 2004, the Constitutional Court dealt a setback to President Roh's plans, ruling that the capital must remain in Seoul as customary constitution, in response to a complaint filed by the main opposition, the conservative Grand National Party. Hence, the Roh administration was forced to modify the project to relocate the majority of government ministries and institutions to Sejong, which would become a special administrative city instead of a new capital. The revised plan was approved by the National Assembly in March 2005. Challenges to the new plan were rejected by the Constitutional Court in November 2005.

When the Grand National Party retook the presidential office in 2008, then-President Lee Myung-bak opposed the idea of moving government agencies, claiming that it would hurt Seoul's global competitiveness and result in inefficiency. Following Lee's directions, plans were made to make Sejong an industrial, science and education hub instead. This plan was opposed by many, including Roh's allies and some members of the ruling Grand National Party, including Lee's arch-rival and eventual successor, Park Geun-hye. Defeat in the mid-2010 local elections forced Lee to present his proposal to the National Assembly where it was voted down.

In December 2008, construction for the Sejong Government Complex started. After level 1 of the construction was completed in November 2012, level 2 was finished in November 2013, and finished construction in November 2014.

In July 2012, Sejong Special Self-Governing City was created by combining all of Yeongi County (연기군) of South Chungcheong Province, three townships of Gongju and one township of Cheongwon County, North Chungcheong Province. Jochiwon was designated the main city within Yeongi.

In April 2013, the city government of Putrajaya, Malaysia signed a letter of intent (LOI) with the government of Sejong City to mark the beginning of cooperations between the two planned capitals.

As of 2019, 12 ministries were relocated to the city. As such, only 5 ministries continue to remain in Seoul; the Ministry of Foreign Affairs, Ministry of Unification, Ministry of Justice, Ministry of National Defense, and Ministry of Gender Equality and Family.

Sejong was specifically designed to be a "smart city", and is sometimes referred to as Sejong Smart City. It is the leading smart city in Korea, and is often held up as the standard for other cities experimenting with the development of smart city infrastructure.

By 2019, there was disagreement among experts as to whether Sejong has "lived up to expectations". Sejong uses its new development to market itself as an alternative to Seoul, offering luxury living at a fraction of the cost. It boasts shiny state-of-the-art condominiums, ample public green space and smart and sustainable city tech, like automated trash collection and zero-waste food disposal, electric car charging and sharing stations, solar-powered buildings, interactive digital signage, closed-circuit television security and fine dust emergency alerts. It has sparked criticism that the new city is not only too lackluster to draw residents away from Seoul, but also difficult to access and poorly designed".

== Geography ==
Sejong is surrounded by the two provinces of South and North Chungcheong, as well as the metropolitan city of Daejeon. It is about 121 kilometres (75 mi) south from Seoul. The city covers a total area of approximately 465 square kilometers, composed of urbanized zones, administrative complexes, and expansive greenbelt areas. Sejong's urban planning follows an environmentally integrated approach, incorporating large-scale green belts, parks, and waterways. Over 50% of its land is reserved for forests, public parks, ecological wetlands, and pedestrian-friendly zones.

Geographically, the area is largely defined by gentle hills, river valleys, and fertile plains, formerly used for agriculture before the city's development. The Miho River, a tributary of the Geum River, flows through the city, and is a huge aspect of both the green landscape and the water management network of the region. The topography and layout of the city has effectively been transformed during the development process, with much of the land being manipulated and rearranged to prepare the land for an ecological landscape where built space and green space could co-exist.

=== Parks ===
Sejong City features multiple parks open to everyone. One of the premier parks is lakeside Sejong Lake Park, located at the heart of Korea's largest artificial lake, which is the size equivalent to 62 soccer fields and has an average water depth of 3 meters. Sejong Lake Park also boasts five artificial islands: Festival Island, which hosts events and cultural festivals; Stage Island, which features Korea's first floating stage; Pool Island, which creates a beach feel in the city; Water Flower Island, and Marsh Island with aquatic vegetation and an ecological marshland. In terms of recreation, there is a walking/running track and a dedicated bike lane that surrounds the lake, giving citizens someplace outdoor to walk, bike, and relax.

Bear Tree Park is a nature and wildlife park covering a total space of about 100,000 square meters in Sejong City, Korea. The park features around 1,000 species of flowers and trees, providing visitors with a wide selection of natural beauty and wild flowers along with art sculptures out of original materials. This collection of nature and attractions is very appealing to families and tourists with the combination of nature and the structured content of the park. Asiatic Black Bear Hill houses approximately 150 Asiatic black bears, which are the mascot of the park, and provides a permanent exhibit of the park's featured animal. There is a Pet Zoo in the park, allowing visitors to see animals up close, such as peacocks and spotted deer. The park area also has an Arboretum displaying themed areas, including areas to see rare plants and animals as well as cared for flower and trees.

=== Climate ===
Sejong City has a humid continental climate (Köppen: Dwa), typical of central inland regions of the Korean Peninsula, but can be considered a borderline humid subtropical climate (Köppen: Cwa) using the −3 °C (27 °F) isotherm.

Winters are cold and dry, with January being the coldest month, averaging −2.7 °C (27.1 °F) in daily mean temperature and a mean minimum of −7.8 °C (18.0 °F). Snowfall is possible but typically light, and precipitation is low, with only 22.6 mm on average in January. Spring brings gradual warming: average daily temperatures rise from 5.5 °C (41.9 °F) in March to 17.4 °C (63.3 °F) in May. Rainfall also increases, with May receiving 86.5 mm (3.41 in) of precipitation over an average of 6.9 days.

Summers are hot and rainy due to the East Asian monsoon. July is the warmest and wettest month, with a daily mean temperature of 25.4 °C (77.7 °F) and average precipitation of 284.9 mm (11.22 in). August follows closely with 260.3 mm of rain, making these two months responsible for nearly half of the city's annual rainfall. Autumn is cooler and drier, with September averaging 19.8 °C (67.6 °F) and rainfall dropping to 141.2 mm, then further declining to 58.4 mm in October.

Sejong receives about 1,204.9 mm (47.44 in) of precipitation annually, spread over 90.3 days with measurable rainfall.

Climate data for Yeonseo-myeon, Sejong City (1993–2020 normals)
Month	Jan	Feb	Mar	Apr	May	Jun	Jul	Aug	Sep	Oct	Nov	Dec	Year
Mean daily maximum °C (°F)	3.8 (38.8)	6.9 (44.4)	13.1 (55.6)	19.6 (67.3)	24.6 (76.3)	28.0 (82.4)	29.4 (84.9)	30.1 (86.2)	26.2 (79.2)	20.8 (69.4)	13.2 (55.8)	5.6 (42.1)	18.4 (65.1)
Daily mean °C (°F)	−2.7 (27.1)	−0.1 (31.8)	5.5 (41.9)	11.7 (53.1)	17.4 (63.3)	21.7 (71.1)	24.7 (76.5)	24.9 (76.8)	19.8 (67.6)	13.0 (55.4)	6.1 (43.0)	−0.7 (30.7)	11.8 (53.2)
Mean daily minimum °C (°F)	−7.8 (18.0)	−5.4 (22.3)	−0.8 (30.6)	5.1 (41.2)	11.2 (52.2)	16.7 (62.1)	21.0 (69.8)	21.1 (70.0)	15.4 (59.7)	7.3 (45.1)	0.8 (33.4)	−5.6 (21.9)	6.6 (43.9)
Average precipitation mm (inches)	22.6 (0.89)	31.4 (1.24)	42.4 (1.67)	76.6 (3.02)	86.5 (3.41)	132.5 (5.22)	284.9 (11.22)	260.3 (10.25)	141.2 (5.56)	58.4 (2.30)	45.3 (1.78)	22.8 (0.90)	1,204.9 (47.44)
Average precipitation days (≥ 0.1 mm)	5.2	5.0	6.3	7.0	6.9	7.7	13.2	12.7	7.8	5.2	7.3	6.0	90.3
Source: Korea Meteorological Administration

== Administrative divisions ==
Sejong is divided into 14 haengjeong-dong (administrative neighborhoods), 1 eup (town) and 9 myeon (townships). The 10 haengjeong-dong and Jochiwon-eup is the city's main urban centre.

Map	Name	Hangul	Hanja	Population (2024–7)	Area (km^{2})
Administrative Neighbourhoods
	Hansol-dong	한솔동	한솔洞 (Note: There are no Hanja for Hansol, Dodam, Areum, Goun, Boram, Saerom, Sodam, Dajeong, Eojin, and Haemil as they derive from native Korean words.)	18,143	2.75
	Saerom-dong	새롬동	새롬洞 (Note: There are no Hanja for Hansol, Dodam, Areum, Goun, Boram, Saerom, Sodam, Dajeong, Eojin, and Haemil as they derive from native Korean words.)	26,479	4.84
	Naseong-dong	나성동	羅城洞	13,176	24.91
	Dodam-dong	도담동	도담洞 (Note: There are no Hanja for Hansol, Dodam, Areum, Goun, Boram, Saerom, Sodam, Dajeong, Eojin, and Haemil as they derive from native Korean words.)	24,976	4.72
	Eojin-dong	어진동	어진洞 (Note: There are no Hanja for Hansol, Dodam, Areum, Goun, Boram, Saerom, Sodam, Dajeong, Eojin, and Haemil as they derive from native Korean words.)	11,278	2.65
	Areum-dong	아름동	아름洞 (Note: There are no Hanja for Hansol, Dodam, Areum, Goun, Boram, Saerom, Sodam, Dajeong, Eojin, and Haemil as they derive from native Korean words.)	23,383	2.19
	Jongchon-dong	종촌동	宗村洞	27,879	1.15
	Goun-dong	고운동	고운洞 (Note: There are no Hanja for Hansol, Dodam, Areum, Goun, Boram, Saerom, Sodam, Dajeong, Eojin, and Haemil as they derive from native Korean words.)	35,964	5.35
	Boram-dong	보람동	보람洞 (Note: There are no Hanja for Hansol, Dodam, Areum, Goun, Boram, Saerom, Sodam, Dajeong, Eojin, and Haemil as they derive from native Korean words.)	19,513	1.33
	Daepyeong-dong	대평동	大坪洞	10,940	1.52
	Sodam-dong	소담동	소담洞 (Note: There are no Hanja for Hansol, Dodam, Areum, Goun, Boram, Saerom, Sodam, Dajeong, Eojin, and Haemil as they derive from native Korean words.)	21,772	4.43
	Dajeong-dong	다정동	다정洞 (Note: There are no Hanja for Hansol, Dodam, Areum, Goun, Boram, Saerom, Sodam, Dajeong, Eojin, and Haemil as they derive from native Korean words.)	28,312	1.74
	Haemil-dong	해밀동	해밀洞 (Note: There are no Hanja for Hansol, Dodam, Areum, Goun, Boram, Saerom, Sodam, Dajeong, Eojin, and Haemil as they derive from native Korean words.)	16,612	8.44
	Bangok-dong	반곡동	盤谷洞	28,923	3.2
Towns
	Jochiwon-eup	조치원읍	鳥致院邑	42,154	13.56
Townships
	Yeongi-myeon	연기면	燕岐面	2,500	12.1
	Yeondong-myeon	연동면	燕東面	2,978	21.5
	Bugang-myeon	부강면	芙江面	5,755	27.79
	Geumnam-myeon	금남면	錦南面	8,581	72.5
	Janggun-myeon	장군면	將軍面	7,032	53.23
	Yeonseo-myeon	연서면	燕西面	7,045	54.58
	Jeonui-myeon	전의면	全義面	5,694	62.44
	Jeondong-myeon	전동면	全東面	3,421	57.74
	Sojeong-myeon	소정면	小井面	2,356	16.47
Total				351,007	465

== Demographics ==
Historical population
Year	Pop.	±%
1970	101,061	—
1980	97,357	−3.7%
1990	90,502	−7.0%
2000	80,031	−11.6%
2010	81,447	+1.8%
2020	353,933	+334.6%
Source: Statistics Korea

The city aimed to have a population of 200,000 in 2012, 300,000 by 2020 and 500,000 by 2030. In 2017, it had a population of 281,120. As of 30 June 2020, Sejong had a population of 351,007.

As of 2018, Sejong had a higher proportion of children than the South Korean average.

=== Religion ===
Religion in Sejong (2024)
1. Not religious (51.0%)
2. Buddhism (17.0%)
3. Protestantism (20.0%)
4. Catholicism (11.0%)
5. Others (2.00%)

The census from 2015 indicated that the majority of Sejong residents did not belong to any particular religion. Protestantism was the most common religion with around 19.9% of the population being adherents, followed by Buddhism at 13.9% and Roman Catholicism at 7.9%.

== Government buildings ==
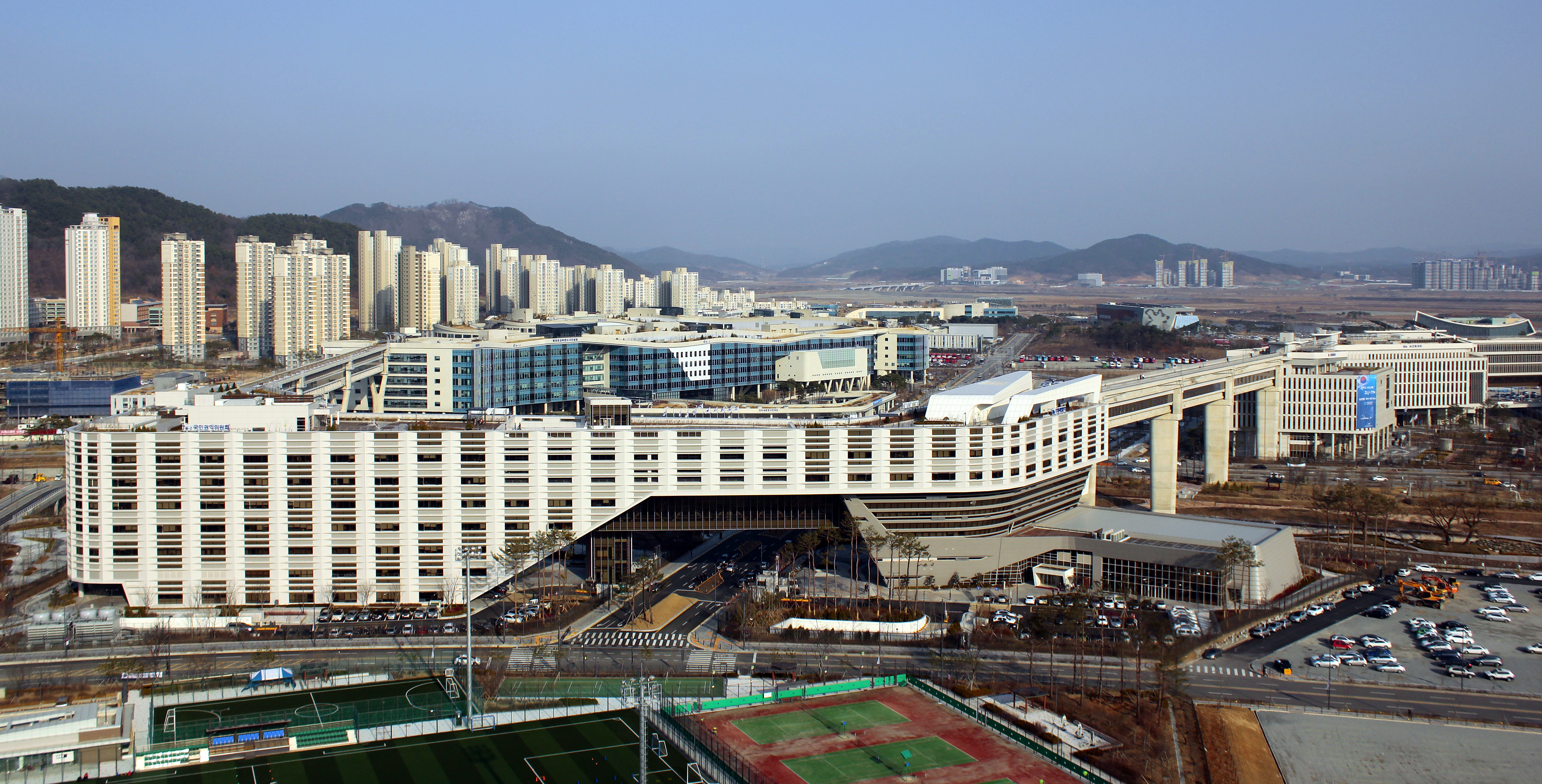
View of the Government Complex Sejong

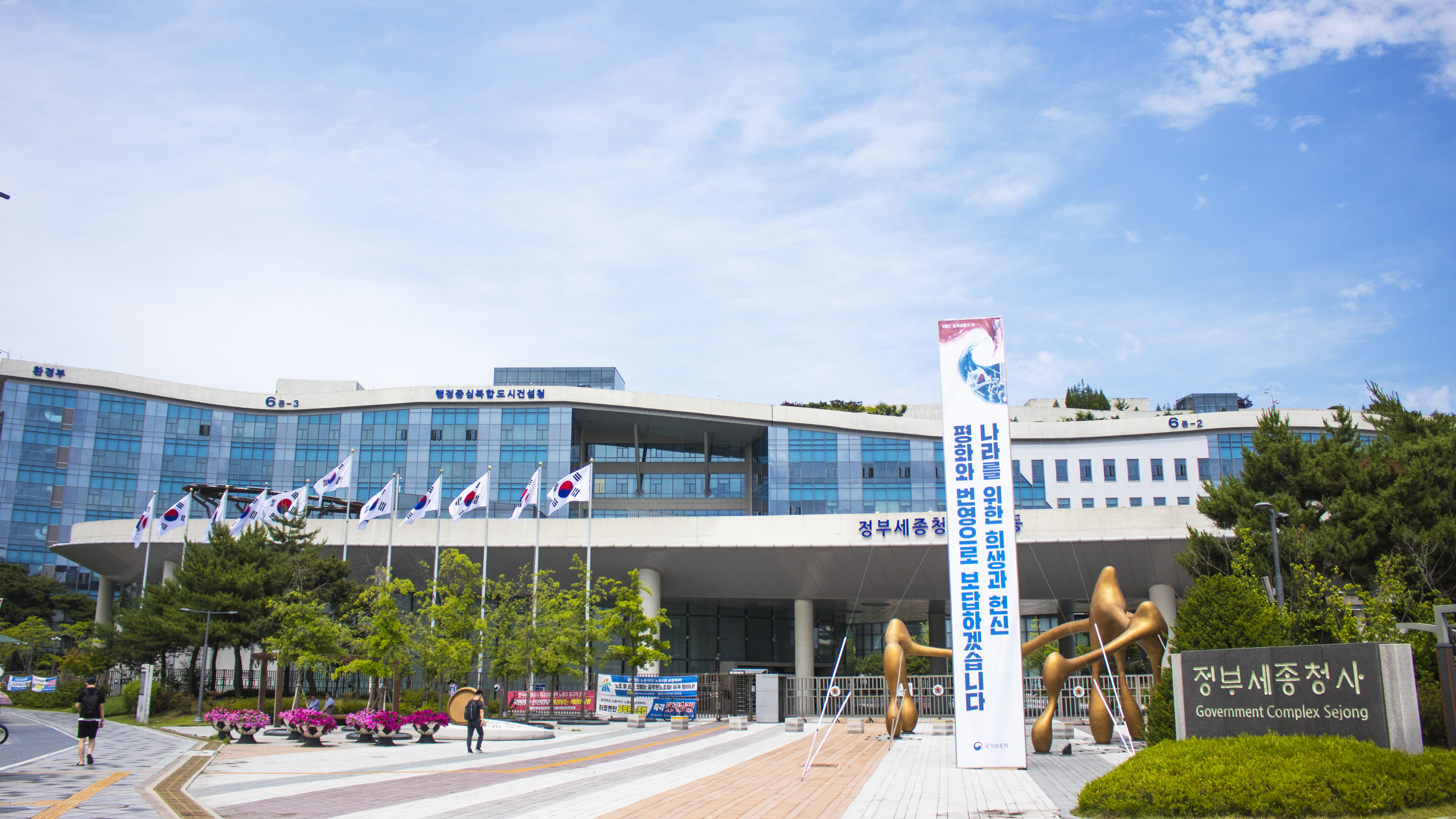
Government Complex Sejong Main Entrance

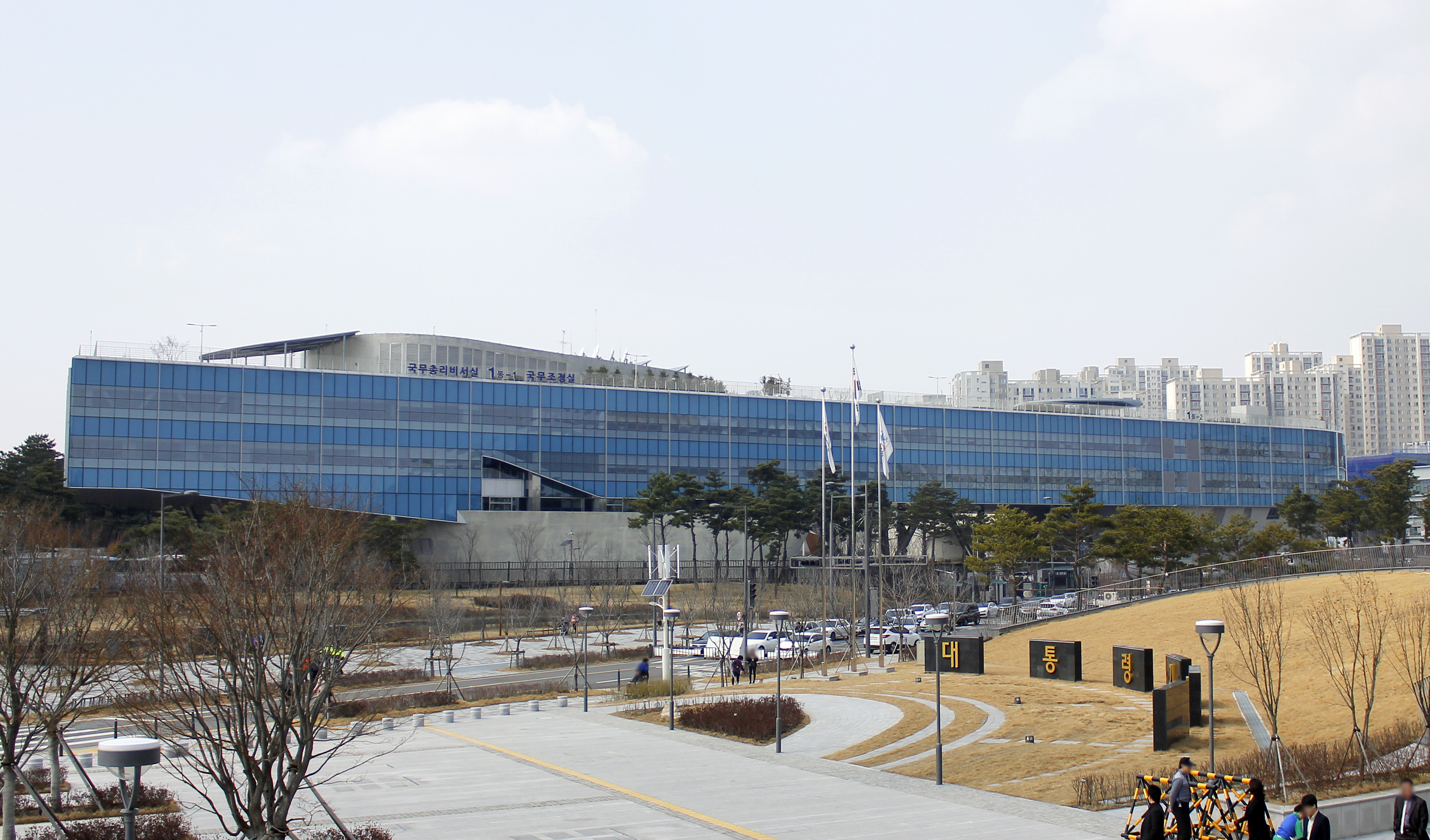
Office of Government Policy Coordination South Korea

The South Korean government plans to move 36 government ministries and agencies to Sejong City. Government Complex Sejong is located in Sejong City. The complex, on a 213,000-square-metre (2,290,000 sq ft) plot of land, has seven stories and one basement. Construction began in November 2011 in what was South Chungcheong Province, and the complex was completed on 16 November 2013. The ceremony to mark the movement of several government agencies to the complex occurred on 23 December 2013.

Government Complex Sejong includes the head offices of:

- Office of the Prime Minister (OPM)
- Ministry of Economy and Finance (MOEF)
- Ministry of Education (MOE)
- Ministry of Science and ICT (MSIT)
- Ministry of the Interior and Safety (MOIS)
- Ministry of Culture, Sports and Tourism (MCST)
- Ministry of Agriculture, Food and Rural Affairs (MAFRA)
- Ministry of Trade, Industry and Energy (MOTIE)
- Ministry of Health and Welfare (MOHW)
- Ministry of Environment (ME)
- Ministry of Employment and Labor (MOEL)
- Ministry of Land, Infrastructure and Transport (MOLIT)
- Ministry of Oceans and Fisheries (MOF)
- Ministry of SMEs and Startups (MSS)
- Ministry of Patriots and Veterans Affairs (MPVA)
- Ministry of Personnel Management (MPM)
- Ministry of Government Legislation (MOLEG)
- National Tax Service (NTS)
- National Agency for Administrative City Construction (NAACC)
- Fair Trade Commission (KFTC)
- Anti-Corruption and Civil Rights Commission (ACRC)

Several MOLIT agencies, the Korea Office of Civil Aviation (KOCA), the Korean Maritime Safety Tribunal (KMST), and the Aviation and Railway Accident Investigation Board (ARAIB), have their headquarters in Government Complex Sejong.

== Culture ==
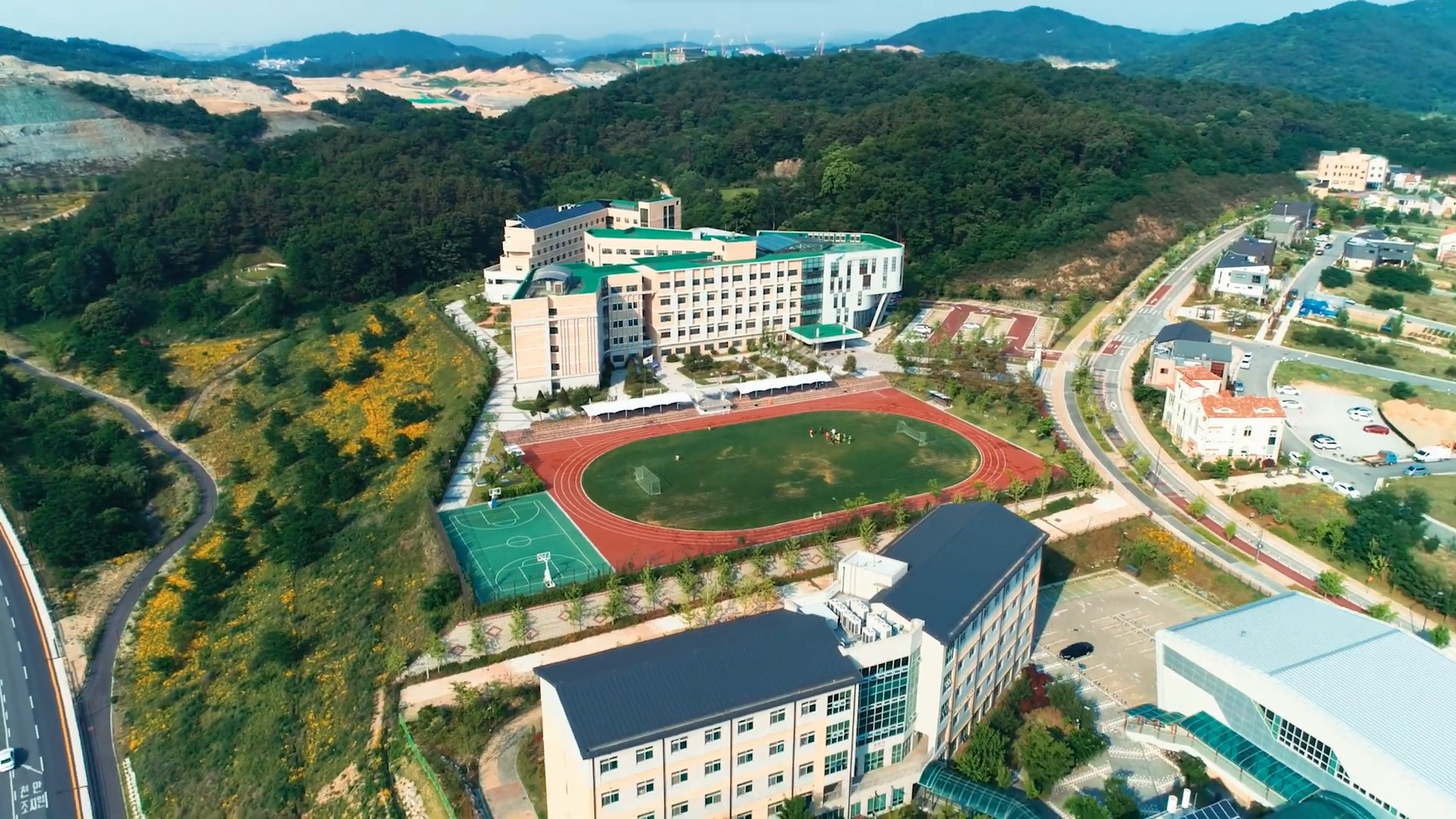
Sejong Academy of Science and Arts

Sejong Lake Park was completed in March 2013 and has various theme facilities in the park, including the square fountain. The size is 705,768m^{2} and the lake area is 322,800m^{2}.

The Sejong National Arboretum is the first urban arboretum in Korea and the largest indoor arboretum in Korea. There are 1.72 million plants of 2834 species available. There is an admission fee of 5,000 won for adults.

== Education ==
Sejong City Office of Education

=== Universities ===
- Daejeon Catholic University
- Global Consortium University
- Hongik University Sejong Campus
- KDI School of Public Policy and Management
- Korea University Sejong Campus
- Korea University of Media Arts
- Sejong University

== Transportation ==
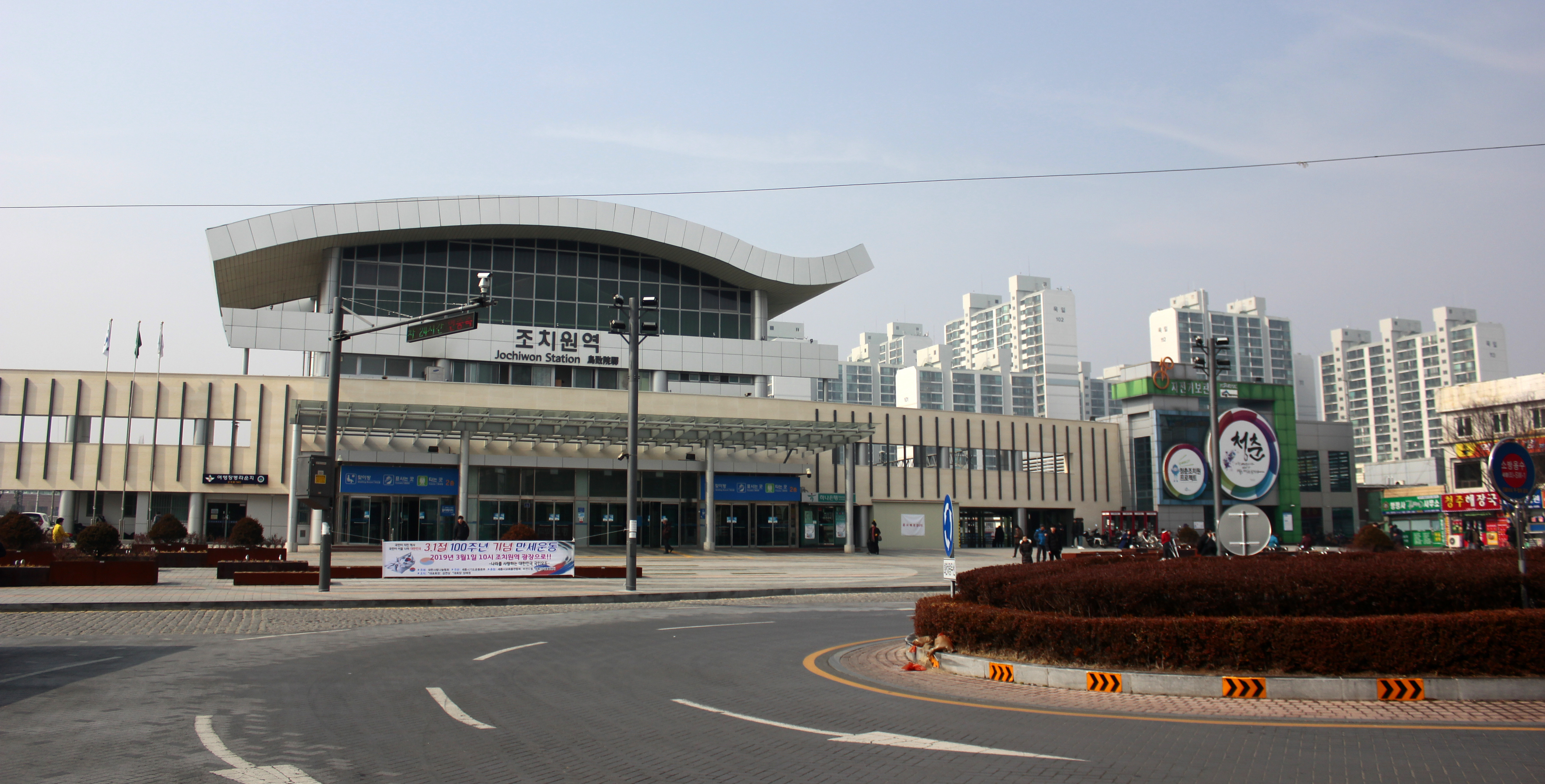
Jochiwon Station

=== Air ===
Sejong is served by Cheongju International Airport in Cheongju, the nearest airport to Sejong.

=== National railway ===
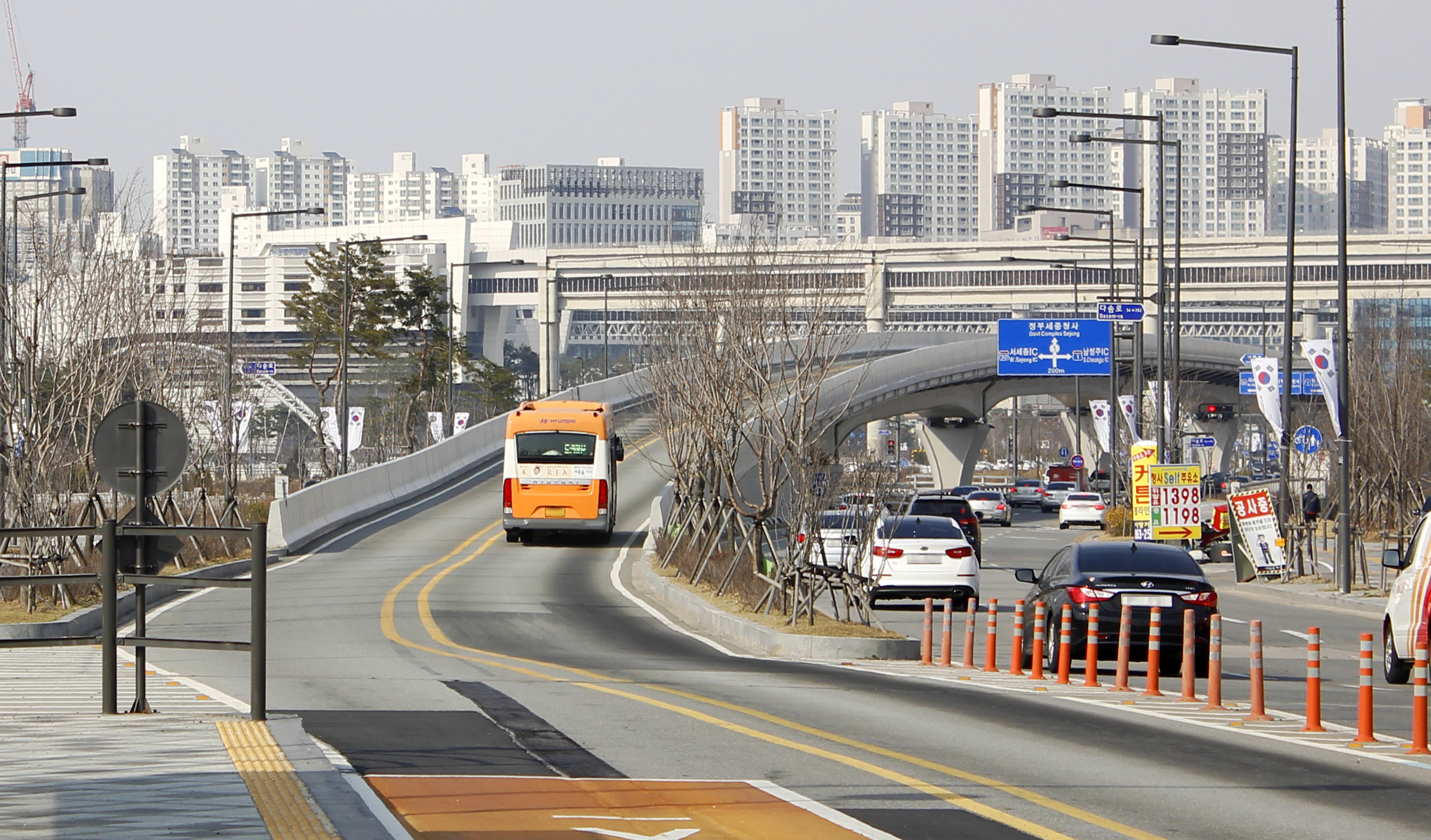
Sejong BRT Viaduct

Sejong is centrally located on Gyeongbu Line operated by Korail. It is a 90-minute journey on the Mugunghwa-ho to Seoul and trains run approximately every 30 minutes. Located just outside Jochiwon-eup limits in Osong, Cheongwon has a KTX station named Osong Station which is a Korea Train Express bullet train that frequently travels 300 km/h (190 mph). Osong station opened in 2010. There has also been some debate concerning opening another KTX station within the new Sejong City close to the bus terminal to the south.

=== Daejeon subway Line 1 ===
In April 2019, a feasibility study was completed and approved an extension of Daejeon Metro Line 1 from Banseok station in Daejeon, accessing the southern bus terminal in Sejong, and ending at the Government Complex Sejong. Of the five new stations that are set to open over the new 14 km of tracks, four of which will be in Sejong. Opening is tentatively set for 2029.

== In popular culture ==
The 2015 tvN television series Let's Eat 2 was based in Sejong. During the month of April, various Sejong Spring Festival celebrations were held throughout the city such as those celebrating cherry blossoms, peach blossoms, and flower arrangements. The 2018 Peace Spring Flower Festival of the Sejong Restoration Center was held under the sponsorship of the Jochiwon, Peach Festival Promotion Committee. It was prepared as a five-sensory satisfaction program to enjoy parts of nature such as peach flower, pear flower, mustard blossom, and to avoid becoming a performance-oriented festival.

== Gallery ==
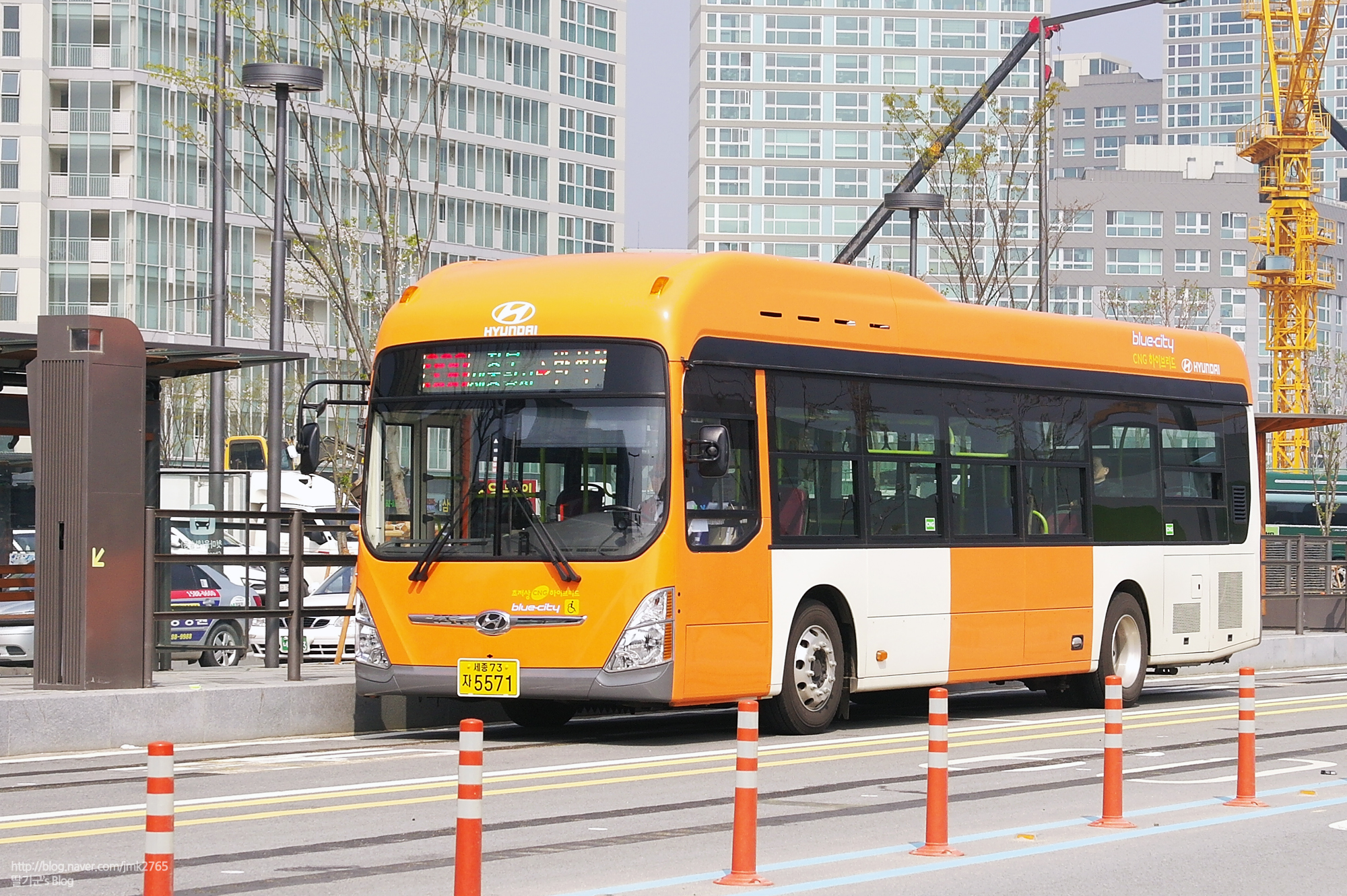
Sejong City's BRT

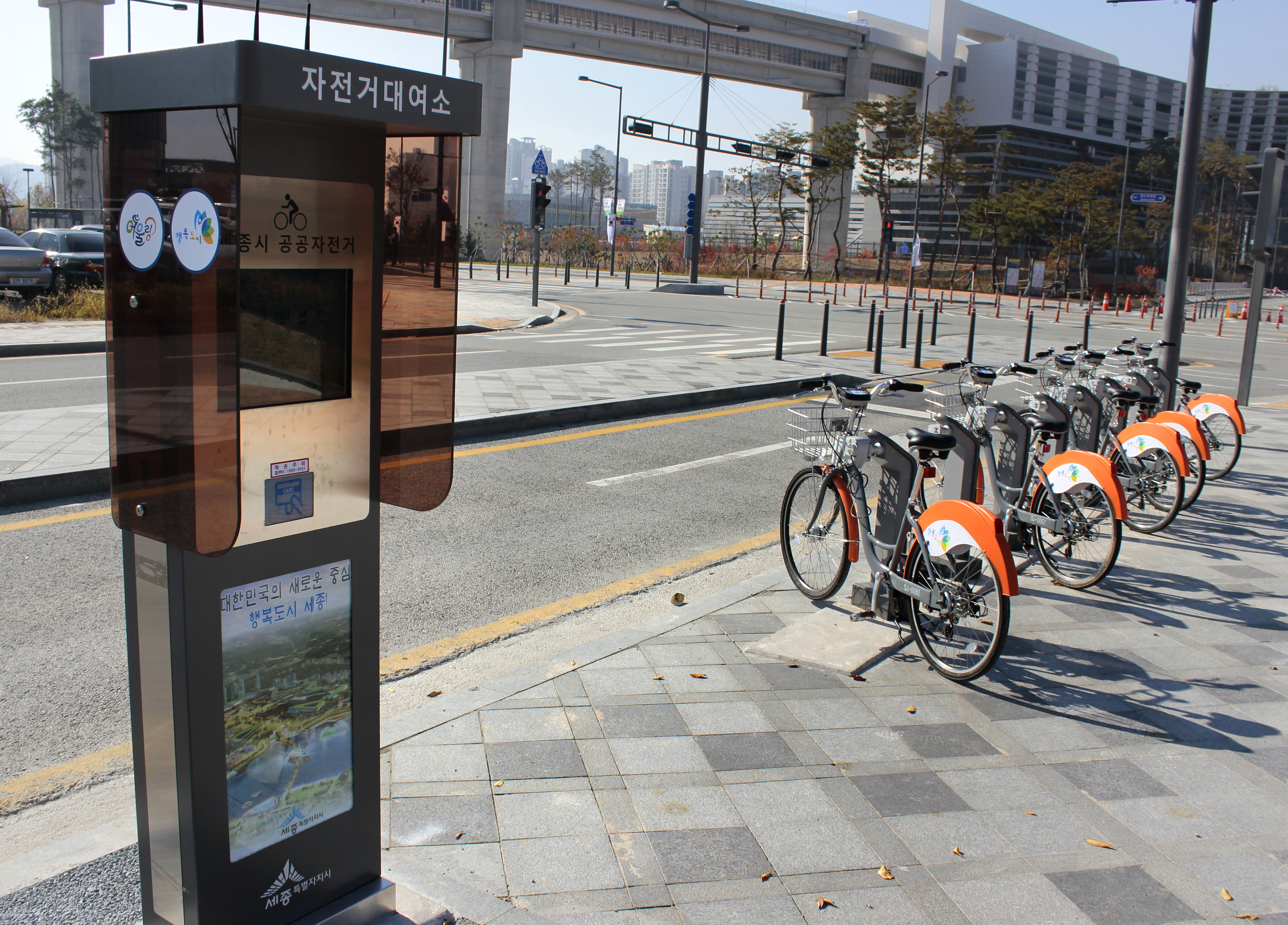
Public bicycle in Sejong City

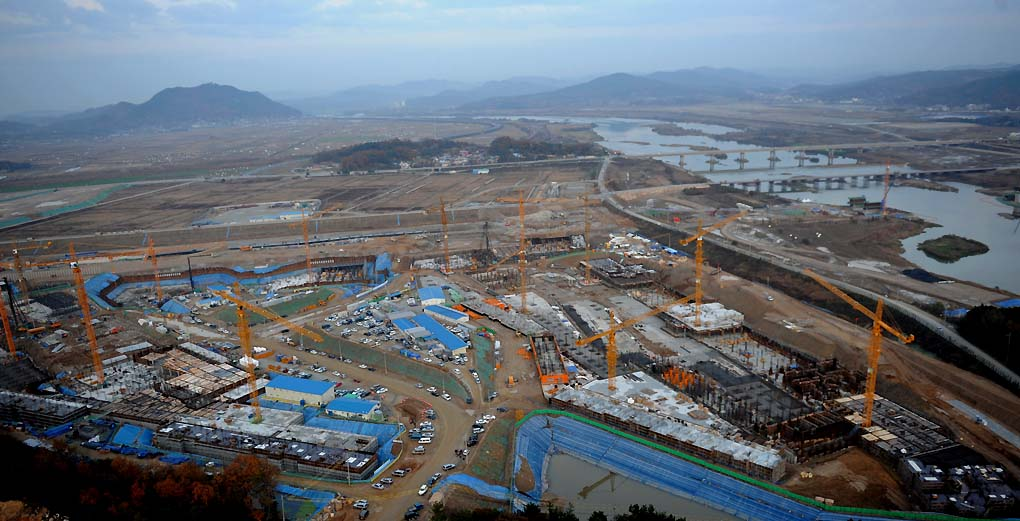
Construction in Sejong City, November 2009
