= Dolgogae station =

Metro station in Gwangju, South Korea

108 돌고개 Dolgogae
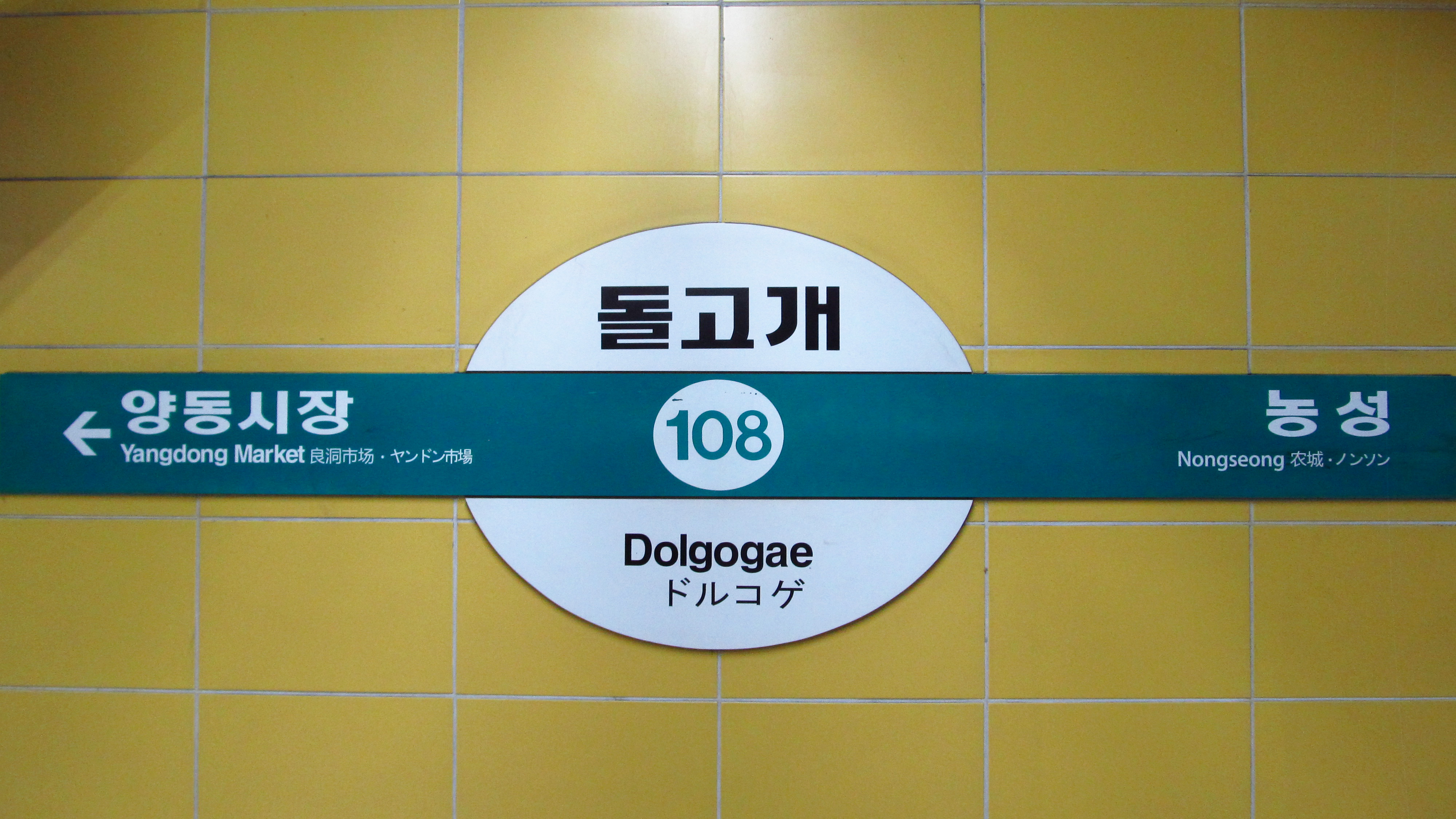
- Station sign

Korean name
- Hangul: 돌고개역
- Hanja: 돌고개驛
- Revised Romanization: Dolgogae-yeok
- McCune–Reischauer: Tolgogae-yŏk

General information
- Location: Wolsan-dong, Nam District, Gwangju; South Korea
- Coordinates: 35°09′06″N 126°53′43″E
- Operator: Gwangju Metropolitan Rapid Transit Corporation
- Line: Line 1
- Platforms: 2
- Tracks: 2

Construction
- Structure type: Underground

Other information
- Station code: 108

History
- Opened: April 28, 2004

Services
Preceding station	Gwangju Metro	Following station
Yangdong Market towards Nokdong	Line 1	Nongseong towards Pyeongdong
Location

Dolgogae station (Korean: 돌고개역) is a station of Gwangju Metro Line 1 in Wolsan-dong, Nam District, Gwangju, South Korea.

== Station layout ==
G	Street Level	Exits
L1	Concourse	Faregates, Ticketing Machines, Station Control
L2; Platforms	Side platform, doors will open on the right
L2; Platforms	Southbound	← Line 1 toward Nokdong (Yangdong Market)
L2; Platforms	Northbound	→ Line 1 toward Pyeongdong (Nongseong) →
L2; Platforms	Side platform, doors will open on the right

== Exits ==
Exit No.	Image	Destinations
1		Gwangju Wolsan Elementary School · Deoklim Jeil Park · Songchon Construction Co., Ltd. · Samneung Construction Co., Ltd.
2		Gwangju Nongseong Elementary School · Gwangju MBC · Nongseong 2-dong Hengjeong Welfare Center · Western Police West-East District University · Cheil Park Mansion · Dongshin University Gwangju Oriental Hospital · Gwangju Bank Nongseong-dong Branch · Chosun Plastic Surgery Clinic · Large Pharmacy (Dolgo Branch) · Choi Yong-seok Dental Clinic · HM Hanmaeum Law Auction
3		Nonsung First Park Mansion · Bitgoeul Methodist Church · Seo-gu Office · Gwangju Provincial Procurement Service · Gwangju Jeonnam Regional Small and Medium Business Administration · Jeollanam-do Health and Environment Research Institute · Nonsung Jeil Park Mansion
4		Balsan Park · Gwangju Yangdong Elementary School · Green Park · Jungheung Park Mansion · Jeonnam Regional Police Agency · Gwangju Seomun Church
