= Geumnamno 5(o)-ga station =

Metro station in Gwangju, South Korea

106 금남로5가 Geumnamno 5(o)-ga
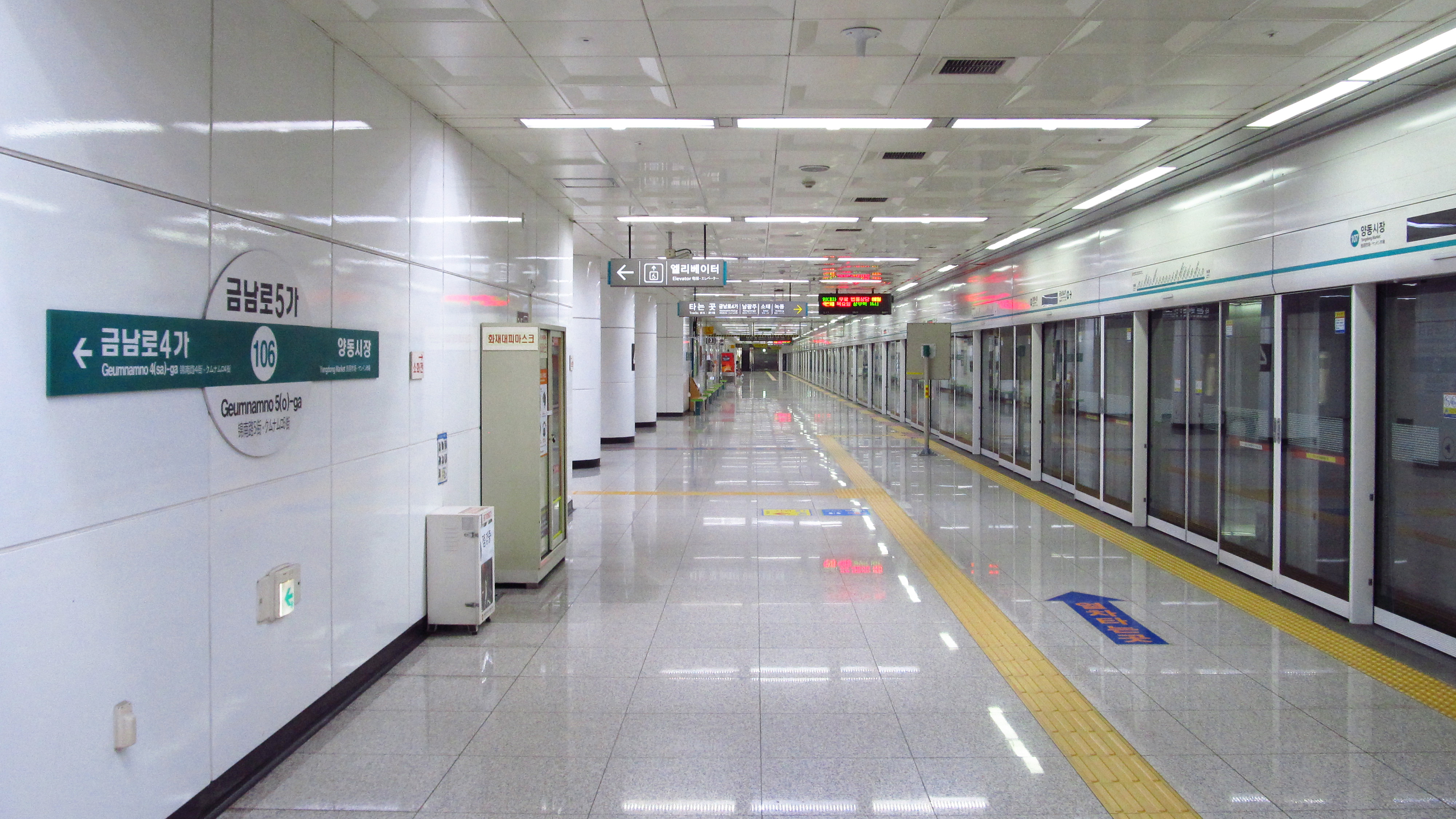

Korean name
- Hangul: 금남로5가역
- Hanja: 錦南路5街驛
- Revised Romanization: Geumnamno o-ga-yeok
- McCune–Reischauer: Kŭmnamno o-ga-yŏk

General information
- Location: Buk-dong, Buk District, Gwangju; South Korea
- Coordinates: 35°09′14″N 126°54′35″E
- Operator: Gwangju Metropolitan Rapid Transit Corporation
- Line: Line 1
- Platforms: 1
- Tracks: 2

Construction
- Structure type: Underground

Other information
- Station code: 106

History
- Opened: April 28, 2004

Services
Preceding station	Gwangju Metro	Following station
Geumnamno 4(sa)-ga towards Nokdong	Line 1	Yangdong Market towards Pyeongdong
Location

Geumnamno 5(o)-ga station (Korean: 금남로5가역) is a station of Gwangju Metro Line 1 in Buk-dong, Buk District, Gwangju, South Korea.

== Station Layout ==
G	Street Level	Exits
L1	Concourse	Faregates, Ticketing Machines, Station Control
L2; Platforms	Southbound	← Line 1 toward Nokdong (Geumnamno 4(sa)-ga)
L2; Platforms	Island platform, doors will open on the left
L2; Platforms	Northbound	→ Line 1 toward Pyeongdong (Yangdong Market) →
