= Namgwangju station =

Metro station in Gwangju, South Korea

103 남광주 Namgwangju
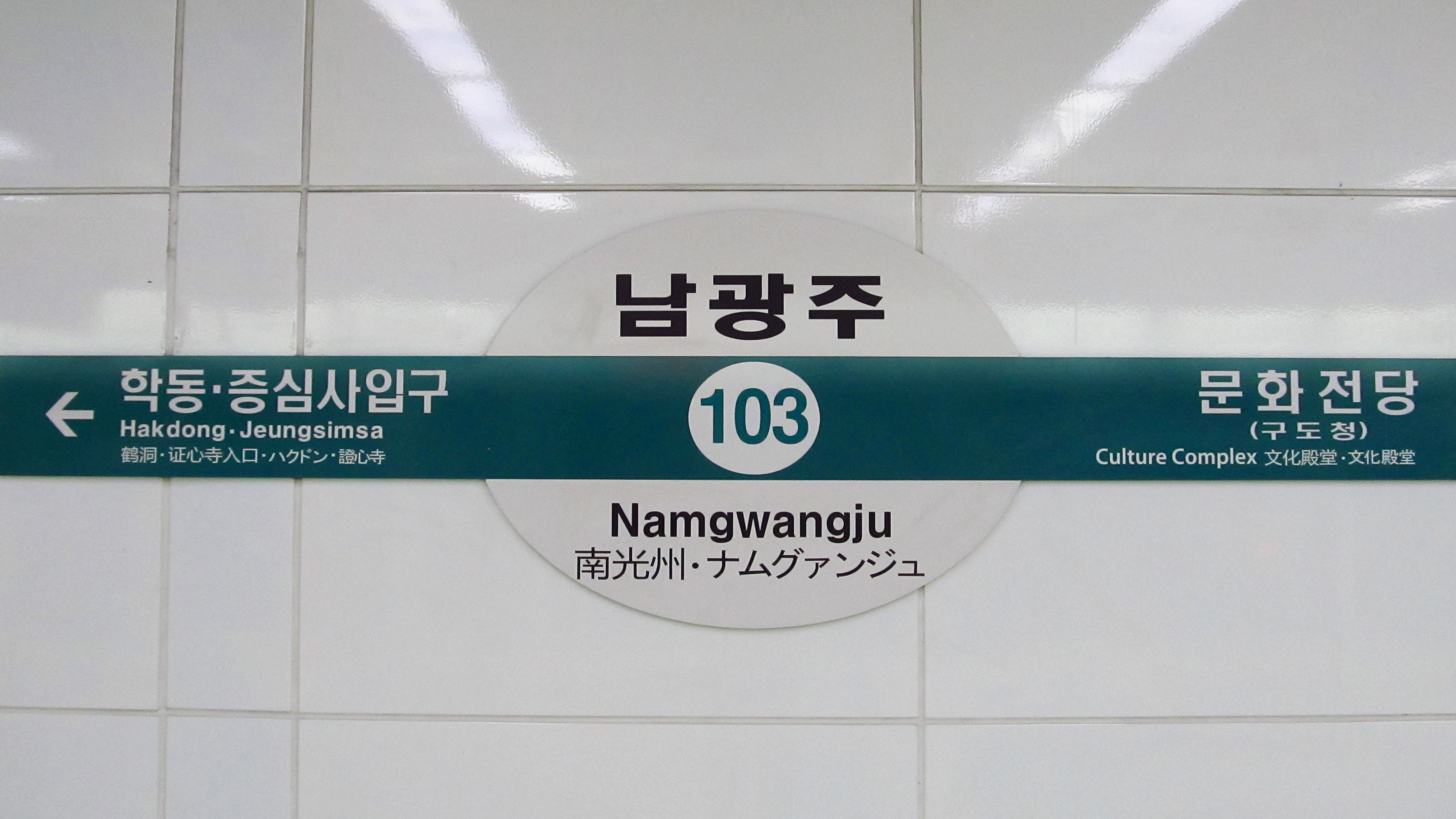

Korean name
- Hangul: 남광주역
- Hanja: 南光州驛
- Revised Romanization: Namgwangjuyeok
- McCune–Reischauer: Namgwangjuyŏk

General information
- Location: Hak-dong, Gwangju; South Korea
- Coordinates: 35°8′21.79″N 126°55′22.34″E
- Operator: Gwangju Metropolitan Rapid Transit Corporation
- Platforms: 2
- Tracks: 2

Construction
- Structure type: Underground

Other information
- Station code: 103

History
- Opened: April 28, 2004

Services
Preceding station	Gwangju Metro	Following station
Hakdong–Jeungsimsa towards Nokdong	Line 1	Culture Complex towards Pyeongdong
Location

Namgwangju station ("South Gwangju station") is a station on Gwangju Metro Line 1, located at Hak-dong 994 in Dong-gu, Gwangju, South Korea. It opened for service on April 28, 2004.

It lies at the site of the former Korail Namgwangju station, which had opened as Singwangju station in 1936 and been renamed Namgwangju in 1938. That station was closed in 2000 as part of the realignment of the Gyeongjeon Line.

== Neighborhood ==
Namgwangju is historically a transportation hub and the gateway to southern Gwangju and Hwasun-gun (county), including the routes to Jeungsimsa Temple and Mudeungsan. The station serves the commercial district surrounding the South Gwangju General Market (Namgwangju Market), which opened in 1975 to serve the Yeosu, Boseong, and Jangheung areas.

Traffic in this area tends to be jammed during rush hours as educational institutions, including Jeonnam Medical School, Chosun University, and Chosun College of Nursing; and governmental and public offices such as the Military Manpower Administration and the Dong-gu government office; are clustered around this station.

== Station layout ==
G	Street Level	Exits
L1	Concourse	Faregates, Ticketing Machines, Station Control
L2; Platforms	Side platform, doors will open on the right
L2; Platforms	Southbound	← Line 1 toward Nokdong (Hakdong·Jeungsimsa)
L2; Platforms	Northbound	→ Line 1 toward Pyeongdong (Culture Complex) →
L2; Platforms	Side platform, doors will open on the right

== See also ==
- Transportation in South Korea
