= Nongseong station =

Metro station in Gwangju, South Korea

109 농성 (한국건강관리협회) Nongseong (Korea Association of Health Promotion)
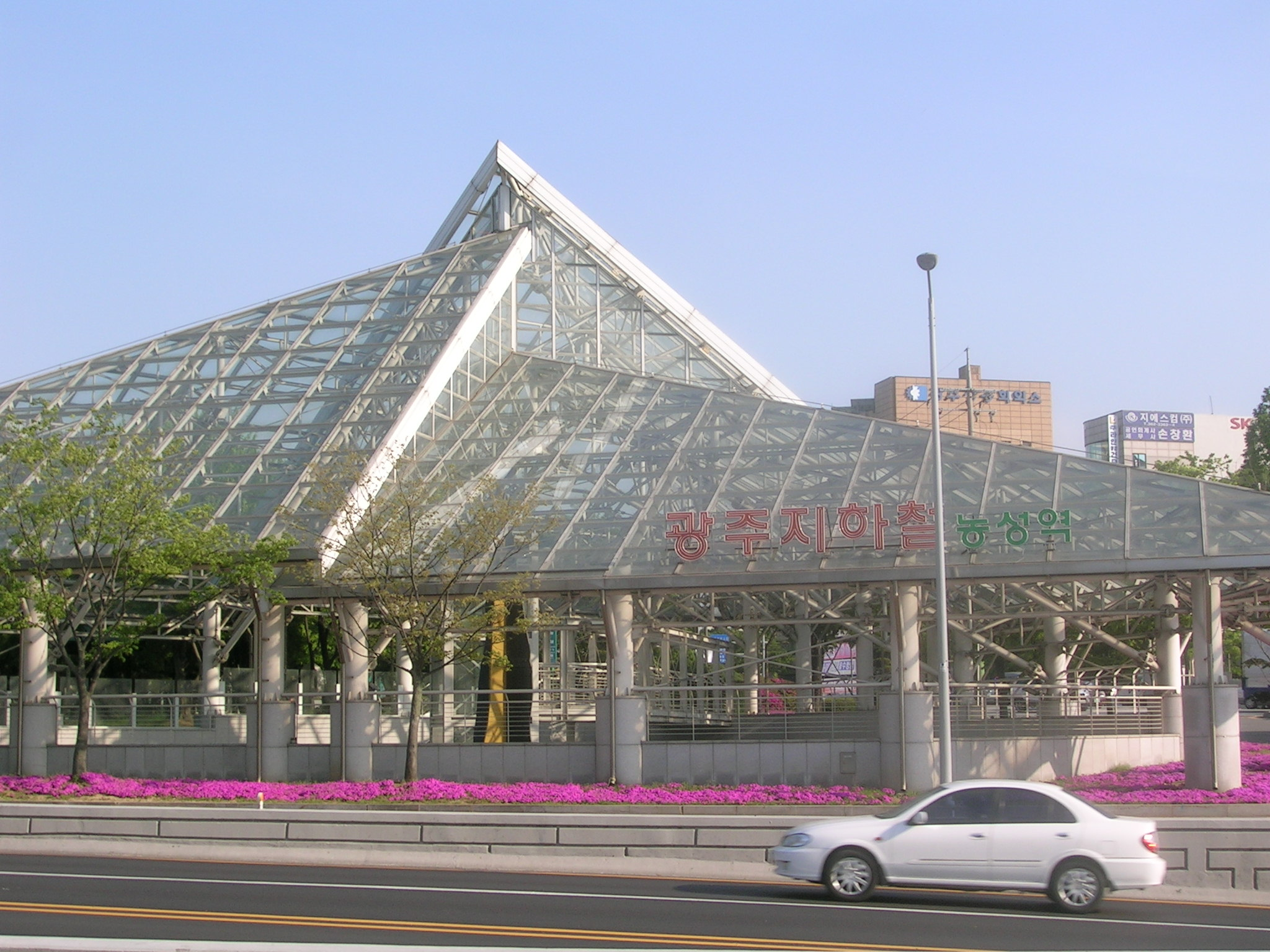
- Outside of Nongseong Station

Korean name
- Hangul: 농성역
- Hanja: 農城驛
- Revised Romanization: Nongseong yeok
- McCune–Reischauer: Nongsŏng yŏk

General information
- Location: Nongseong-dong, Seo District, Gwangju; South Korea
- Coordinates: 35°09′12″N 126°53′02″E
- Operator: Gwangju Metropolitan Rapid Transit Corporation
- Line: Gwangju Metro Line 1
- Platforms: 2
- Tracks: 2

Construction
- Structure type: Underground

Other information
- Station code: 109

History
- Opened: April 28, 2004

Services
| Preceding station | Gwangju Metro | Following station |
|---|---|---|
| Dolgogae towards Nokdong | Line 1 | Hwajeong towards Pyeongdong |
Location

Nongseong station (Korean: 농성역; Hanja: 農城驛) is a station of Gwangju Metro Line 1 in Nongseong-dong, Seo District, Gwangju, South Korea.

== Station layout ==
| G | Street Level | Exits |
| L1 | Concourse | Faregates, Ticketing Machines, Station Control |
| L2; Platforms | Side platform, doors will open on the right |
| L2; Platforms | Southbound | ← Line 1 toward Nokdong (Dolgogae) |
| L2; Platforms | Northbound | → Line 1 toward Pyeongdong (Hwajeong) → |
| L2; Platforms | Side platform, doors will open on the right |

== Exits ==
| Exit No. | Image | Destinations |
|---|---|---|
| 1 | | Nongseong Square, Korea Health Management Association |
| 2 | | Honam Deaf Church, Gwangju Seoseok Middle and High School, Namhwa Apartment |
| 3 | | Jeungheung Park Mansion, Hwajeong-dong Mudeung Park Mansion, Gwangju Sauri Hospital |
| 4 | | Gwangju Bus Terminal, Hwajeong-dong Samik Mansion, Kumho World, Gwangju Shinsegae, Hyundai Motor Seogwangju Service |
| 5 | | Dongsan Apartment, Galleria Wedding Hall, Buckingham Wedding Hall, Gwangju General Bus Terminal |
| 6 | | Yangdong Public Security Center; Gwangju Yangdong Elementary School; Gwangju Seo-gu Welfare Center |
| 7 | | Evergreen Cloud Bridge, Waterworks Headquarters Facility Management Office, Seogu Public Health Center, Gwangju Forestry Cooperative, Nongseong 1-dong Administrative Welfare Center, Government Employees Pension (Sangnok Hall), Marriott Wedding Hall, Small Business Market Promotion Corporation, Gwangju Special Education Center, Public Officials Pension Corporation |
