= Sangmu station =

Metro station in Gwangju, South Korea

113 상무 (스마트저축은행) Sangmu (Smart Savings Bank)
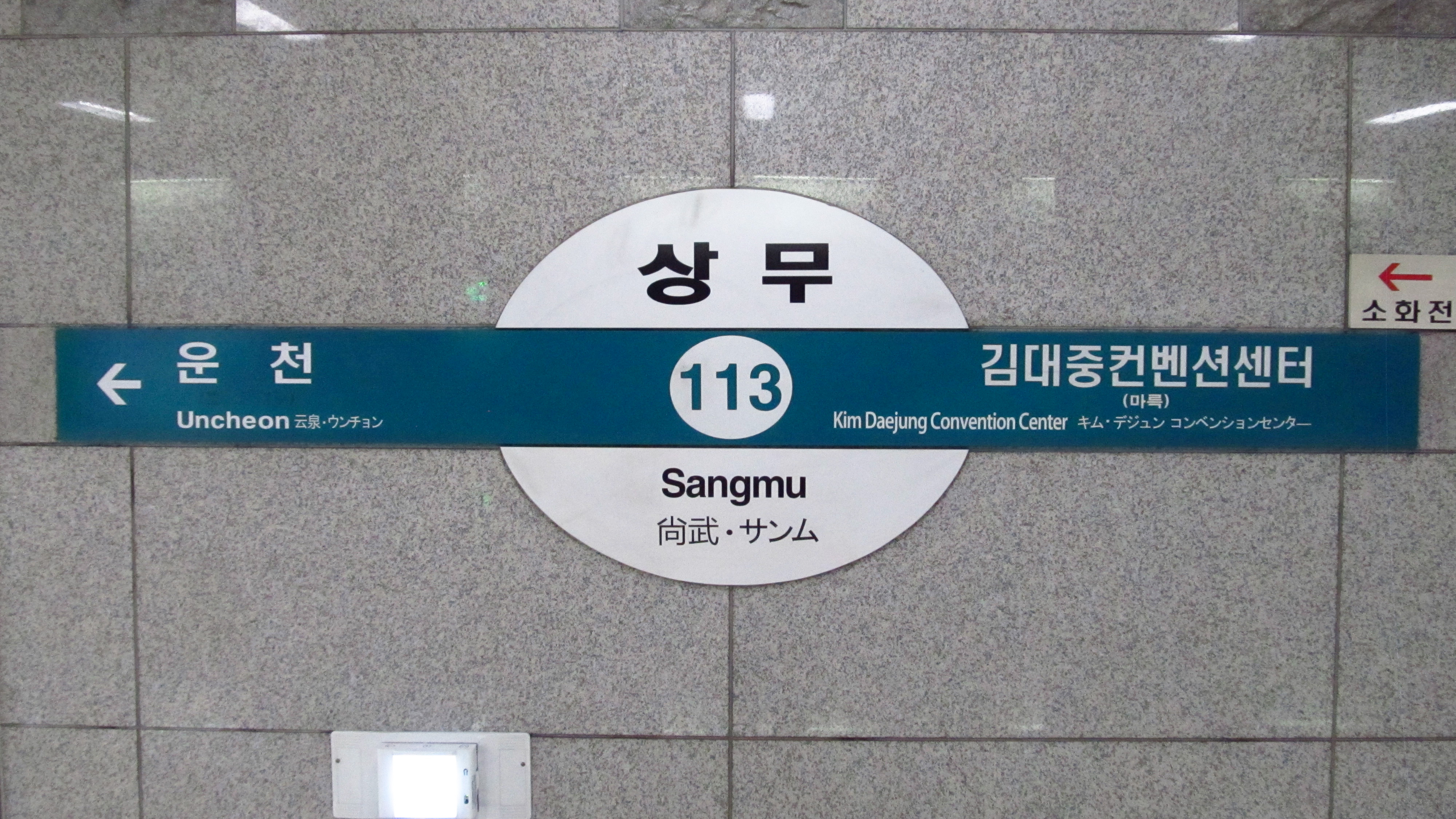

Korean name
- Hangul: 상무역
- Hanja: 尙武驛
- Revised Romanization: Sangmu yeok
- McCune–Reischauer: Sangmu yŏk

General information
- Location: Maneuk-dong, Seo District, Gwangju; South Korea
- Coordinates: 35°08′48″N 126°50′55″E
- Operator: Gwangju Metropolitan Rapid Transit Corporation
- Line: Line 1
- Platforms: 2
- Tracks: 2

Construction
- Structure type: Underground

Other information
- Station code: 113

History
- Opened: April 28, 2004

Services
Preceding station	Gwangju Metro	Following station
Uncheon towards Nokdong	Line 1	Kim Daejung Convention Center towards Pyeongdong
Location

Sangmu station (Korean: 상무역; Hanja: 尙武驛) is a station of Gwangju Metro Line 1 in Maneuk-dong, Seo District, Gwangju, South Korea.

== Station layout ==
G	Street Level	Exits
L1	Concourse	Faregates, Ticketing Machines, Station Control
L2; Platforms	Side platform, doors will open on the right
L2; Platforms	Southbound	← Line 1 toward Nokdong (Uncheon)
L2; Platforms	Northbound	→ Line 1 toward Pyeongdong (Kim Daejung Convention Center) →
L2; Platforms	Side platform, doors will open on the right

== Exits ==
Exit No.	Image	Destinations
1		Uncheon Reservoir, Seochang Nonghyup Maejang Branch
2		Gwangju Urban Railroad Corporation, Gwangju Bank Urban Railroad Corporation (Exit), Daewon Automobile Academy
3		Chipyeong-dong Administrative Welfare Center, Western Police Station, Northern District, Chipyeong Elementary School, Umi Apartment, Shung Outlet
4		Chonnam Middle School, Chipyeongdong Government Welfare Center, Police Station, Chipyong Elementary School, Chonnam National High School, line garden apartments, Kumho Ssangyong apartment, SM美(beauty) Plastic Surgery, Shinhan Bank executive branch, Hyundai Securities Executive Branch
5		Gwangju Metropolitan City Office, Songkwang Travel Agency, Gwangju Woori Hospital, Lee Yeon-an Department, Kyobo Life Insurance, KB Kookmin Bank Business Branch, Net Soft
6		City Hall Square Road, Sangmu 1 Dong Post Office, Seoul Arts Center, Bohae
