= Kim Daejung Convention Center station =

Metro station in Gwangju, South Korea

114 김대중컨벤션센터 (마륵) Kim Daejung Convention Center (Mareuk)
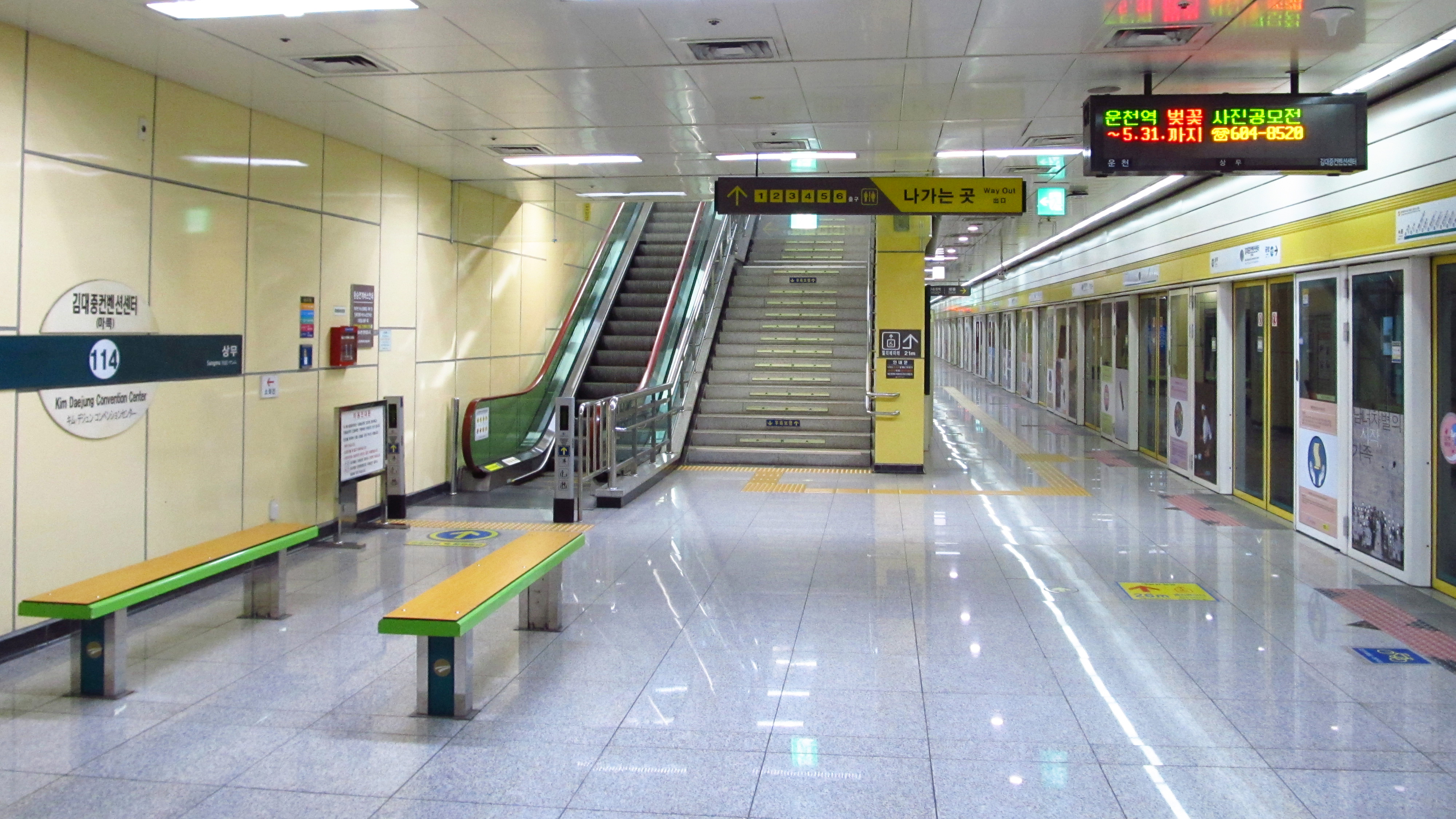

Korean name
- Hangul: 김대중컨벤션센터역
- Hanja: 金大中컨벤션센터驛
- Revised Romanization: Gim Daejung keonbensyeon senteo yeok
- McCune–Reischauer: Kim Taejung k'ŏnbensyŏn sent'ŏ yŏk

General information
- Location: Mareuk-dong, Seo District, Gwangju; South Korea
- Coordinates: 35°8′35.30″N 126°50′29.09″E
- Operator: Gwangju Metropolitan Rapid Transit Corporation
- Line: Line 1
- Platforms: 2
- Tracks: 2

Construction
- Structure type: Underground

Other information
- Station code: 114

History
- Opened: April 11, 2008

Services
Preceding station	Gwangju Metro	Following station
Sangmu towards Nokdong	Line 1	Airport towards Pyeongdong
Location

Kim Daejung Convention Center station (Korean: 김대중컨벤션센터역; Hanja: 金大中컨벤션센터驛) is a station of Gwangju Metro Line 1 in Mareuk-dong, Seo-gu District, Gwangju, South Korea. The Gwangju Metropolitan Rapid Transit Corporation is near the station. The station name comes from Kim Daejung Convention Center, which is nearby the station.

It is a management station that manages from this station to Pyeongdong station. It is connected to the Airport station through the Hakja Tunnel.

== Station layout ==
G	Street Level	Exits
L1	Concourse	Faregates, Ticketing Machines, Station Control
L2; Platforms	Side platform, doors will open on the right
L2; Platforms	Southbound	← Line 1 toward Nokdong (Sangmu)
L2; Platforms	Northbound	→ Line 1 toward Pyeongdong (Airport) →
L2; Platforms	Side platform, doors will open on the right

== Exits ==
Exit No.	Image	Destinations
1		Gwangju Metropolitan Rapid Transit Corporation
2		Gwangju Metropolitan Rapid Transit Corporation, Seochang Intersection
3		Seochang Intersection
4		Kim Daejung Convention Center, Umi Apartment, Maeul Village
5		Hana Real Estate, Maeul Village, Maeul Dongori Village
6		Jeonnam High School, Dongsan Apartment, Chipyeong Elementary School, Gwangju Jeil New Cooperative, Hanullim Korean Traditional Music Academy, Enhak Gore Church, Seochang Nonghyup Convention Branch, Gwangju Internet News, Jangsu Stone Bed, TG Sambo Service Gwangju Center, Jeonnam Middle School
