= Hakdong–Jeungsimsa station =

Metro station in Gwangju, South Korea

102 학동·증심사입구 Hakdong·Jeungsimsa
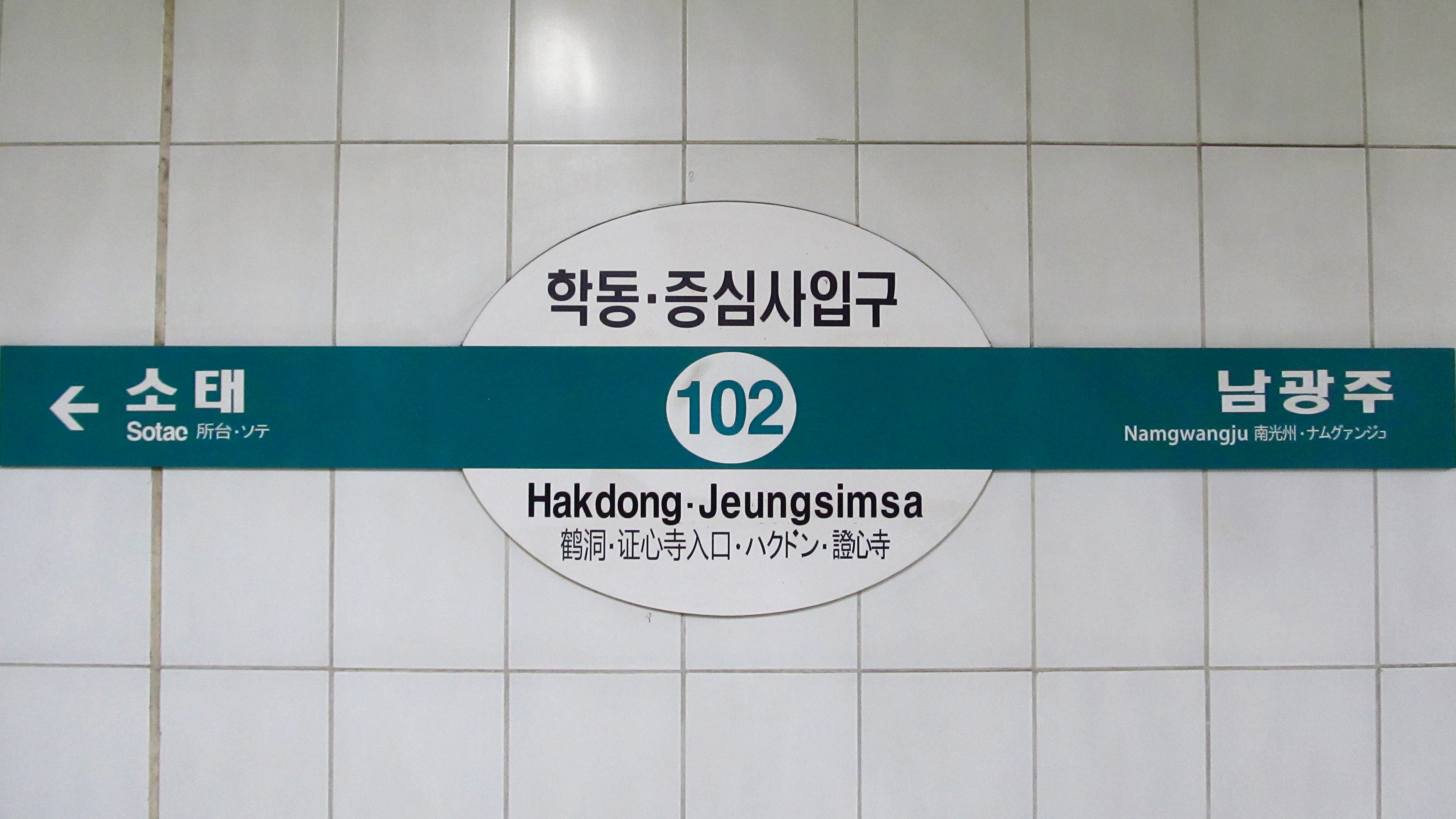

Korean name
- Hangul: 학동·증심사입구역
- Hanja: 鶴洞·證心寺入口驛
- Revised Romanization: Hakdong·Jeungsimsa ipgu yeok
- McCune–Reischauer: Hak-tong·Chŭngsimsa ipku yŏk

General information
- Location: Hak-dong, Gwangju; South Korea
- Coordinates: 35°07′57″N 126°55′43″E
- Operator: Gwangju Metropolitan Rapid Transit Corporation
- Line: Line 1
- Platforms: 2
- Tracks: 2

Construction
- Structure type: Underground

Other information
- Station code: 102

History
- Opened: April 28, 2004

Services
Preceding station	Gwangju Metro	Following station
Sotae towards Nokdong	Line 1	Namgwangju towards Pyeongdong
Location

Hakdong·Jeungsimsa station (Korean: 학동·증심사입구역) is a station on Line 1 of the Gwangju Metro in Hak-dong, Gwangju, South Korea. It opened on April 28, 2004. The station is underground and has two side platforms. It is located between Sotae station and Namgwangju station and serves the Hak-dong area near Jeungsimsa.

== Name origin ==
Jeungsimsa is situated in Hakdong. Hakdong was originally called Hakmaeul ("crane village") as it is a hill area on the Mudeung Mountain that looks like a crane. Since 1947, Hakmaeul has been renamed Hakdong·Jeungsimsa.

== Design ==
The backdrop of the station is composed of various signs and billboards. Materials and decorative patterns are used consistently, providing a unified visual presentation.

== Surrounding area ==
Nammunno is the axis that connects the downtown-bound and Hwasunn-bound planning line. In the west are neighborhood market facilities and in the east are high-rise apartments and greenery.

== Station layout ==
G	Street Level	Exits
L1	Concourse	Faregates, Ticketing Machines, Station Control
L2; Platforms	Side platform, doors will open on the right
L2; Platforms	Southbound	← Line 1 toward Nokdong (Sotae)
L2; Platforms	Northbound	→ Line 1 toward Pyeongdong (Namgwangju) →
L2; Platforms	Side platform, doors will open on the right

== See also ==
- Gwangju Metro
- Transportation in South Korea
