= Postal codes in South Korea =

Emblem of Korea Post

Postal codes in South Korea are composed of five digits. A new system of post codes was introduced on August 1, 2015. The first postal code in South Korea was established on July 1, 1970, and has been revised three times: in 1988, 2000, and 2015.

== History ==
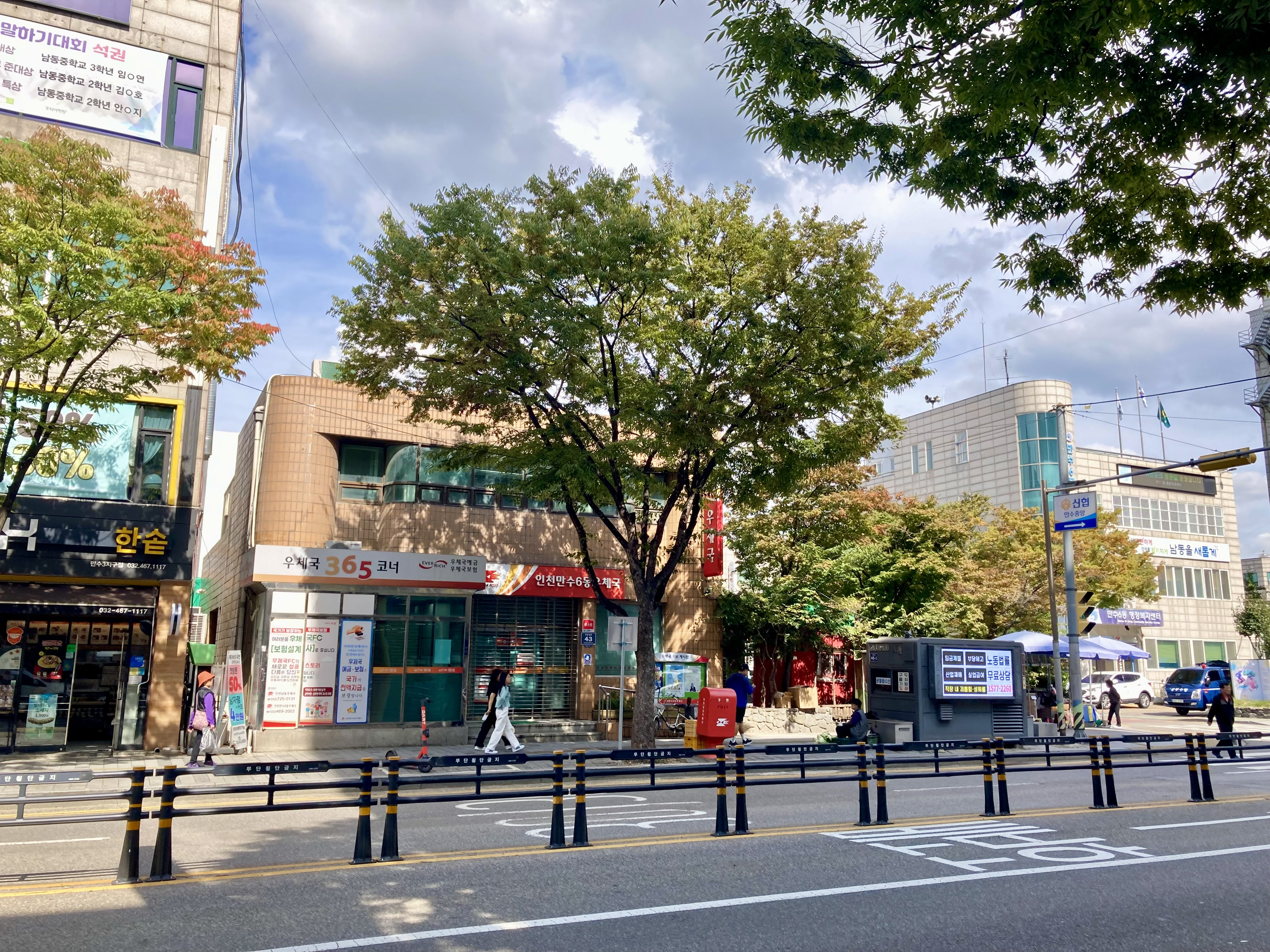
Korea Postal Office

=== 1970–1988 ===
South Korea's first postal code was introduced on July 1, 1970. Individual codes were provided for each post office distribution area, using an nnn-nn numeric format (e.g., 120-01 represented Susaek-dong, Seodaemun-gu, Seoul). Unlike current postal coding provided by administrative districts, the 1970 system was implemented based upon a post office's railroad line; this often led to inconsistencies in post codes relative to their administrative areas.

Large post offices used a three-digit postal code, and small offices a five-digit code. For example, the Seoul Central Post Office's code was 100, and the Seoul Susaek-dong Post Office's was 120-01. Codes in the 700s were assigned to military posts, in the 800s to Hwanghae, the 900s to Pyongan, and the 000 range to Hamgyong.

=== 1988–2000 ===
Postal codes became six digits long on February 1, 1988. They were grouped by administrative areas as reflected by district reorganization and highway transportation networks. New groupings were also implemented: units in the 400s, not previously available, were allocated to Gyeonggi and Incheon, and 700s units, previously military, were changed to Gyeongbuk and Daegu. These codes utilized an nnn-nnn format; the first three digits represented, in order, the metropolitan administrative district (large city, metropolitan area, province, special autonomous area, etc.), the resident's neighborhood or ward, and a specific city, county, or district.

The last three digits matched the code to the recipient. They were assigned based on a postal carrier's delivery route. These sub-codes were divided into statutory dongs and administrative dongs, followed by myeons, and then by buildings and/or mailboxes.

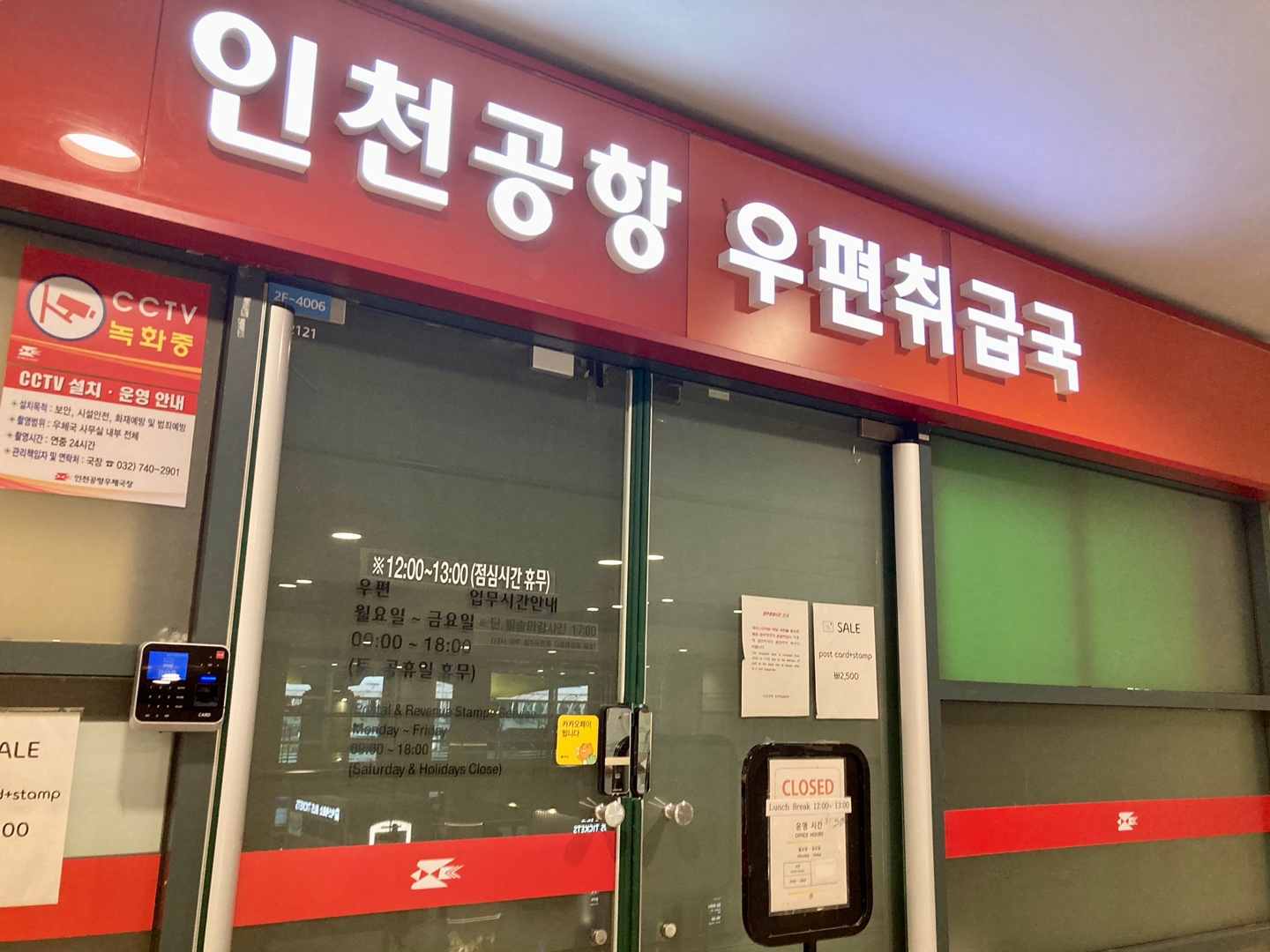
Incheon International Airport 1 Terminal Postal Office(EMS Post box, 2024.08)

=== 2000–2015 ===
On May 1, 2000, postal codes were assigned to each delivery agent's postal area to facilitate easier distribution. This system relied upon the codes assigned in 1988. New postal codes were subdivided to match each postman's delivery area, taking into account the introduction of automated mail sorting equipment.

- 2015.8.1 ZIP code is used by introducing a five-digit National Basic District System number.

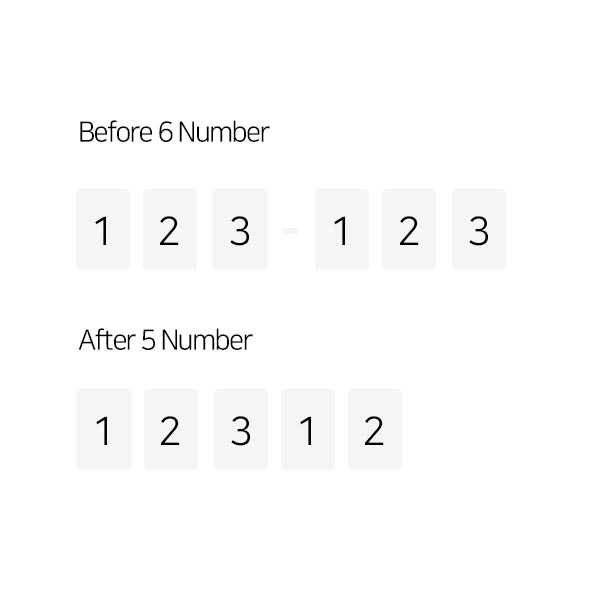
5 five-digit State Basic District Number

== Current System ==
Map of the South Korean postcode system

The State Basic District System was introduced in South Korea on August 1, 2015. The five-digit State Basic District Number is given to each State Basic District, and it is used as a postal code of that district instead of the former six-digit code.

=== Assignment system ===
Current postal codes are structured around five digits. The first three digits represent a municipality, and the last two digits are given to the districts inside the corresponding municipality, from the northwest corner of the district to the southeast.

=== The National Basic Zone (5 digits) ===
Refers to the number of zones published to the general public, such as statistics, firefighting, and mail.

"Article 19, Paragraph 3 of the Road Name Address Act", is used as the basic unit of statistical area, postal area.

In the case of Seoul, the numbers are from 01 to 09. For example, 01000, the first two digits are 01.

Prefix Ranges

Prefix Range	Province or Region	Hangul
01-09	Seoul	서울
10-23	Gyeonggi-do	경기
24-26	Gangwon-do	강원
27-29	Chungcheongbuk-do	충북
30-35	Chungcheongnam-do	충남
36-43	Gyeongsangbuk-do	경북
44-53	Gyeongsangnam-do	경남
54-56	Jeonbuk-do	전북
57-62	Jeollanam-do	전남
63	Jeju	제주

The National Basic District system is utilised for various administrative purposes, including postal services, national statistics, firefighting, school districts, police jurisdiction, and elections.

A total of 34,349 basic districts have been established nationwide, delineated by topographical features such as roads, rivers, and railroads. Each district is assigned a unique five-digit number.

These numbers range from Seoul (01XXX) to Jeju (63XXX), with specific number ranges reserved for urban development and potential future unification

=== Table of the first three digits of the postal codes currently assigned ===
Location	Digits	0	1	2	3	4	5	6	7	8	9
Seoul	01	Gangbuk-gu			Dobong-gu			Nowon-gu			
Seoul	02	Jungnang-gu				Dongdaemun-gu			Seongbuk-gu		
Seoul	03	Jongno-gu			Eunpyeong-gu			Seodaemun-gu			Mapo-gu
Seoul	04	Mapo-gu			Yongsan-gu		Jung-gu		Seongdong-gu		Gwangjin-gu
Seoul	05	Gwangjin-gu		Gangdong-gu			Songpa-gu				
Seoul	06	Gangnam-gu					Seocho-gu				Dongjak-gu
Seoul	07	Dongjak-gu		Yeongdeungpo-gu			Gangseo-gu				Yangcheon-gu
Seoul	08	Yangcheon-gu		Guro-gu			Geumcheon-gu		Gwanak-gu		
Seoul	09										
Gyeonggi-do	10	Gimpo-si		Goyang-si						Paju-si	
Gyeonggi-do	11	Yeoncheon-gun	Pocheon-si		Dongducheon-si	Yangju-si		Uijeongbu-si			Guri-si
Gyeonggi-do	12	Namyangju-si				Gapyeong-gun	Yangpyeong-gun	Yeoju-si	Gwangju-si		Hanam-si
Gyeonggi-do	13	Hanam-si	Seongnam-si							Gwacheon-si	Anyang-si
Gyeonggi-do	14	Anayang-si		Gwangmyeong-si		Bucheon-si					Siheung-si
Gyeonggi-do	15	Siheung-si		Ansan-si						Gunpo-si	
Gyeonggi-do	16	Uiwang-si		Suwon-si						Yongin-si	
Gyeonggi-do	17	Yongin-si			Icheon-si		Anseong-si		Pyeongtaek-si		
Gyeonggi-do	18	Pyeongtaek-si	Osan-si	Hwaseong-si							
Gyeonggi-do	19										
Gyeonggi-do	20										
Incheon	21	Gyeyang-gu			Bupyeong-gu		Namdong-gu				Yeonsu-gu
Incheon	22	Yeonsu-gu	Michuhol-gu		Jung-gu		Dong-gu	Seo-gu			
Incheon	23	Ganghwa-gun	Ongjin-gun								
Gangwon-do	24	Cheorwon-gun	Hwacheon-gun	Chuncheon-si			Yanggu-gun	Inje-gun	Goseong-gun	Sokcho-si	
Gangwon-do	25	Yangyang-gun	Hongcheon-gun	Hoengseong-gun	Pyeongchang-gun	Gangneung-si			Donghae-si		Samcheok-si
Gangwon-do	26	Taebaek-si	Jeongseon-gun	Yeongwol-gun	Wonju-si						
Chungcheongbuk-do	27	Danyang-gun	Jecheon-si		Chungju-si			Eumseong-gun		Jincheon-gun	Jeungpyeong-gun
Chungcheongbuk-do	28	Goesan-gun	Cheongju-si								Boeun-gun
Chungcheongbuk-do	29	Okcheon-gun	Yeongdong-gun								
Sejong-si	30	Sejong-si (Note: Sejong-si is a one-level municipality, although it is considered as a high-level. There is no low-level municipality in it.)									
Chungcheongnam-do	31	Cheonan-si				Asan-si			Dangjin-si		Seosan-si
Chungcheongnam-do	32	Seosan-si	Taean-gun	Hongseong-gun		Yesan-gun	Gongju-si		Geumsan-gun	Gyeryong-si	Nonsan-si
Chungcheongnam-do	33	Nonsan-si	Buyeo-gun		Cheongyang-gun	Boryeong-si		Seocheon-gun			
Daejeon	34	Yuseong-gu			Daedeok-gu		Dong-gu			Jung-gu	
Daejeon	35	Jung-gu		Seo-gu							
Gyeongsangbuk-do	36	Yeongju-si		Bonghwa-gun	Uljin-gun	Yeongdeok-gun	Yeongyang-gun	Andong-si		Yecheon-gun	Mungyeong-si
Gyeongsangbuk-do	37	Mungyeong-si	Sangju-si		Uiseong-gun	Cheongsong-gun	Pohang-si				
Gyeongsangbuk-do	38	Gyeongju-si			Cheongdo-gun	Gyeongsan-si				Yeongcheon-si	
Gyeongsangbuk-do	39	(Note: Gunwi-gun was a part of Gyeongsangbuk-do, but it has been incorporated into Daegu since July 1, 2023.)	Gumi-si				Gimcheon-si			Chilgok-gun	
Gyeongsangbuk-do	40	Seongju-gun	Goryeong-gun	Ulleung-gun							
Daegu	41	Dong-gu				Buk-gu			Seo-gu		Jung-gu
Daegu	42	Suseong-gu				Nam-gu		Dalseo-gu			Dalseong-gun
Daegu	43	Dalseong-gun	Gunwi-gun								
Ulsan	44	Dong-gu		Buk-gu		Jung-gu		Nam-gu			Ulju-gun
Ulsan	45	Ulju-gun									
Busan	46	Gijang-gun		Geumjeong-gu			Buk-gu		Gangseo-gu		Sasang-gu
Busan	47	Sasang-gu	Busanjin-gu				Yeonje-gu		Dongnae-gu		
Busan	48	Haeundae-gu		Suyeong-gu		Nam-gu			Dong-gu		Jung-gu
Busan	49	Yeongdo-gu		Seo-gu	Saha-gu						
Gyeongsangnam-do	50	Hamyang-gun	Geochang-gun	Hapcheon-gun	Changnyeong-gun	Miryang-si	Yangsan-si			Gimhae-si	
Gyeongsangnam-do	51	Gimhae-si	Changwon-si								
Gyeongsangnam-do	52	Haman-gun	Uiryeong-gun	Sancheong-gun	Hadong-gun	Namhae-gun	Sacheon-si	Jinju-si			Goseong-gun
Gyeongsangnam-do	53	Tongyeong-si		Geoje-si							
Jeollabuk-do	54	Gunsan-si			Gimje-si		Iksan-si			Jeonju-si	
Jeollabuk-do	55	Jeonju-si			Wanju-gun	Jinan-gun	Muju-gun	Jangsu-gun	Namwon-si		Imsil-gun
Jeollabuk-do	56	Sunchang-gun	Jeongeup-si		Buan-gun	Gochang-gun					
Jeollanam-do	57	Yeonggwang-gun	Hampyeong-gun	Jangseong-gun	Damyang-gun		Gokseong-gun	Gurye-gun	Gwangyang-si		Suncheon-si
Jeollanam-do	58	Suncheon-si	Hwasun-gun	Naju-si		Yeongam-gun	Muan-gun	Mokpo-si		Sinan-gun	Jindo-gun
Jeollanam-do	59	Haenam-gun	Wando-gun	Gangjin-gun	Jangheung-gun	Boseong-gun	Goheung-gun	Yeosu-si			
Jeollanam-do	60										
Gwangju	61	Buk-gu				Dong-gu		Nam-gu			Seo-gu
Gwangju	62	Seo-gu		Gwangsan-gu							
Jeju-do	63	Jeju-si (Note: Jeju-do is a one-level municipality, although it is considered as a high-level. There is no low-level municipality in it: Jeju-si and Seogwipo-si are not municipalities.)					Seogwipo-si				

== Status of Address System and Administrative Changes ==
- Current Statistics (as of Nov. 7, 2023): Under the Road Name Address Act, there are 34,605 zip codes and approximately 6.4 million road name addresses registered nationwide.
- Jan. 1, 2024 (Bucheon-si): Bucheon reorganized its administrative structure by reinstating three general districts (Wonmi-gu, Sosa-gu, Ojeong-gu) and abolishing the "metropolitan dong" system. Please verify addresses for relevant community centers and institutions.
- Jan. 18, 2024 (Jeonbuk): Jeonbuk Special Self-Governing Province was officially launched.
  - Administrative codes changed from 42 to 52.
  - English designation changed to "Jeonbuk-do" (formerly Jeollabuk-do).
- Aug. 1, 2024 (Seongju-gun): Geumsu-myeon was renamed Geumsugangsan-myeon. Consequently, administrative codes for the Myeon and its subordinate villages (Ri) were updated.
- July 2026 (Incheon - Planned): Major administrative redistricting is confirmed.
  - Jung-gu & Dong-gu → Reorganized into Jemulpo-gu and Yeongjong-gu.
  - Seo-gu → Divided into Seo-gu and Geomdan-gu.
