= Gwangju Songjeong Station (Gwangju Metro) =

Railway station in Gwangju, South Korea

117 광주송정역 Gwangju Songjeong Station
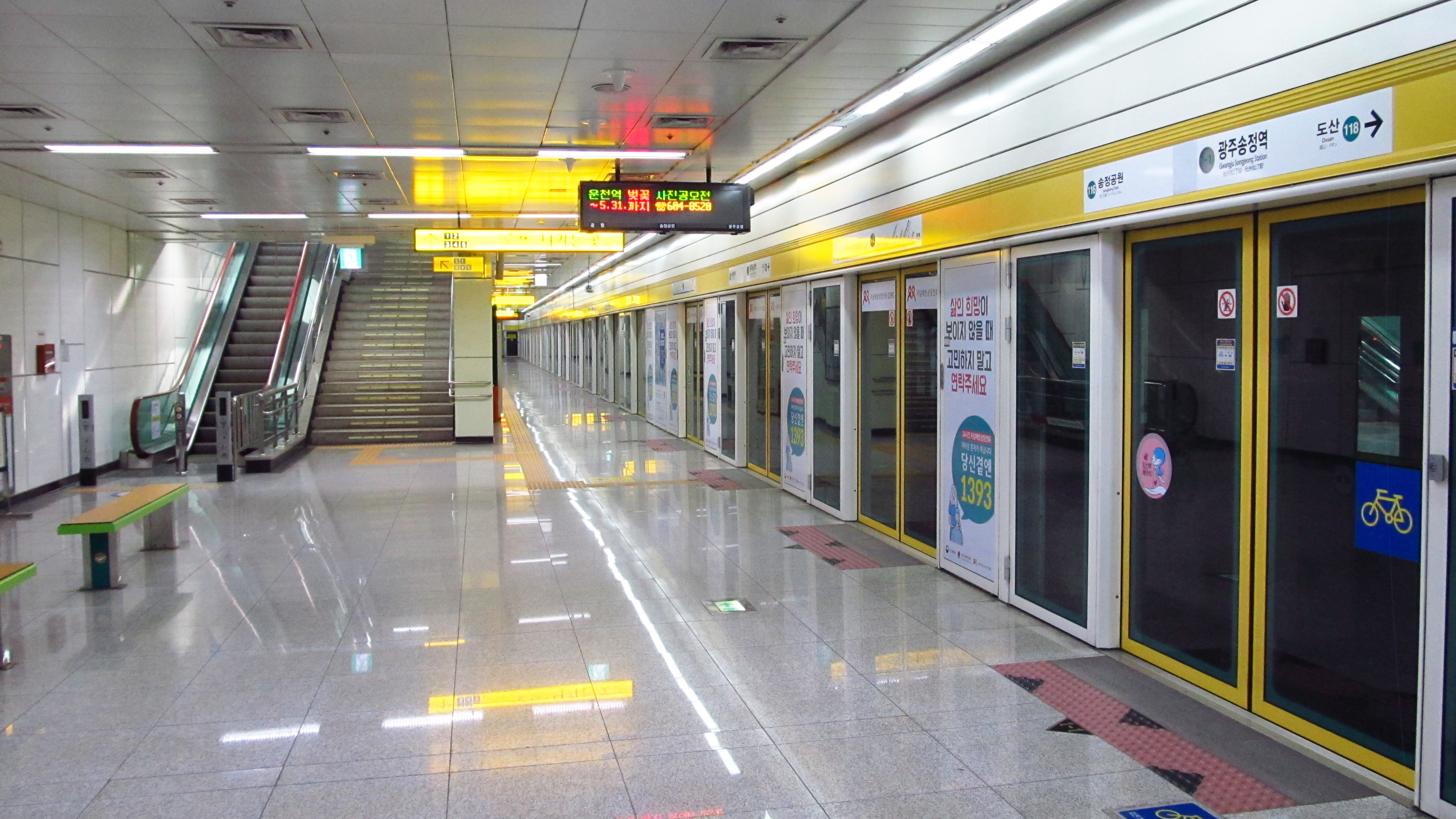

Korean name
- Hangul: 광주송정역
- Hanja: 光州松汀驛
- Revised Romanization: Gwangjusongjeongnyeok
- McCune–Reischauer: Kwangju-Songjŏngnyŏk

General information
- Location: Songjeong-dong, Gwangsan District, Gwangju; South Korea
- Coordinates: 35°8′14.61″N 126°47′29.30″E
- Operator: Gwangju Metropolitan Rapid Transit Corporation
- Line: Line 1
- Platforms: 2
- Tracks: 2
- Connections: GwangjuSongjeong Station

Construction
- Structure type: Underground
- Cycle facilities: Yes

Other information
- Station code: 117

History
- Opened: April 11, 2008
- Former names: Songjeong-ri

Services
Preceding station	Gwangju Metro	Following station
Songjeong Park towards Nokdong	Line 1	Dosan towards Pyeongdong
Location

Gwangju Songjeong Station (Korean: 광주송정역, formerly Songjeong-ri Station) is a station of Gwangju Metro Line 1 in Songjeong-dong, Gwangsan District, Gwangju, South Korea. The station is unrelated to the GwangjuSongjeong Station of Korail.

== Station layout ==
G	Street Level	Exits
L1	Concourse	Faregates, Ticketing Machines, Station Control
L2; Platforms	Side platform, doors will open on the right
L2; Platforms	Southbound	← Line 1 toward Nokdong (Songjeong Park)
L2; Platforms	Northbound	→ Line 1 toward Pyeongdong (Dosan) →
L2; Platforms	Side platform, doors will open on the right

== Exits ==
Exit No.	Image	Destinations
1		Gwangsan-gu Office, Public Health Center, Songjeong 2-dong Administrative Welfare Center, Gwangsan-gu Office 2, Songjeong Post Office, Songjeong Middle School, Myeongdong Apartment, Daecheon Apartment, Eryongshin Cooperative, Gwangju Bank Songjeong Branch
2		Ivory Apartment, Songkwang Middle School, Songjeong Nonghyup Station, Gwangjong Dental Clinic
3		Songjeong Line 2nd Apartment, Gwangju Agricultural Technology Center, GwangjuSongjeong Station
4		GwangjuSongjeong Station
5		Yeonggwangtong Intersection
