= Yangdong Market station =

Metro station in Gwangju, South Korea

107 양동시장 Yangdong Market
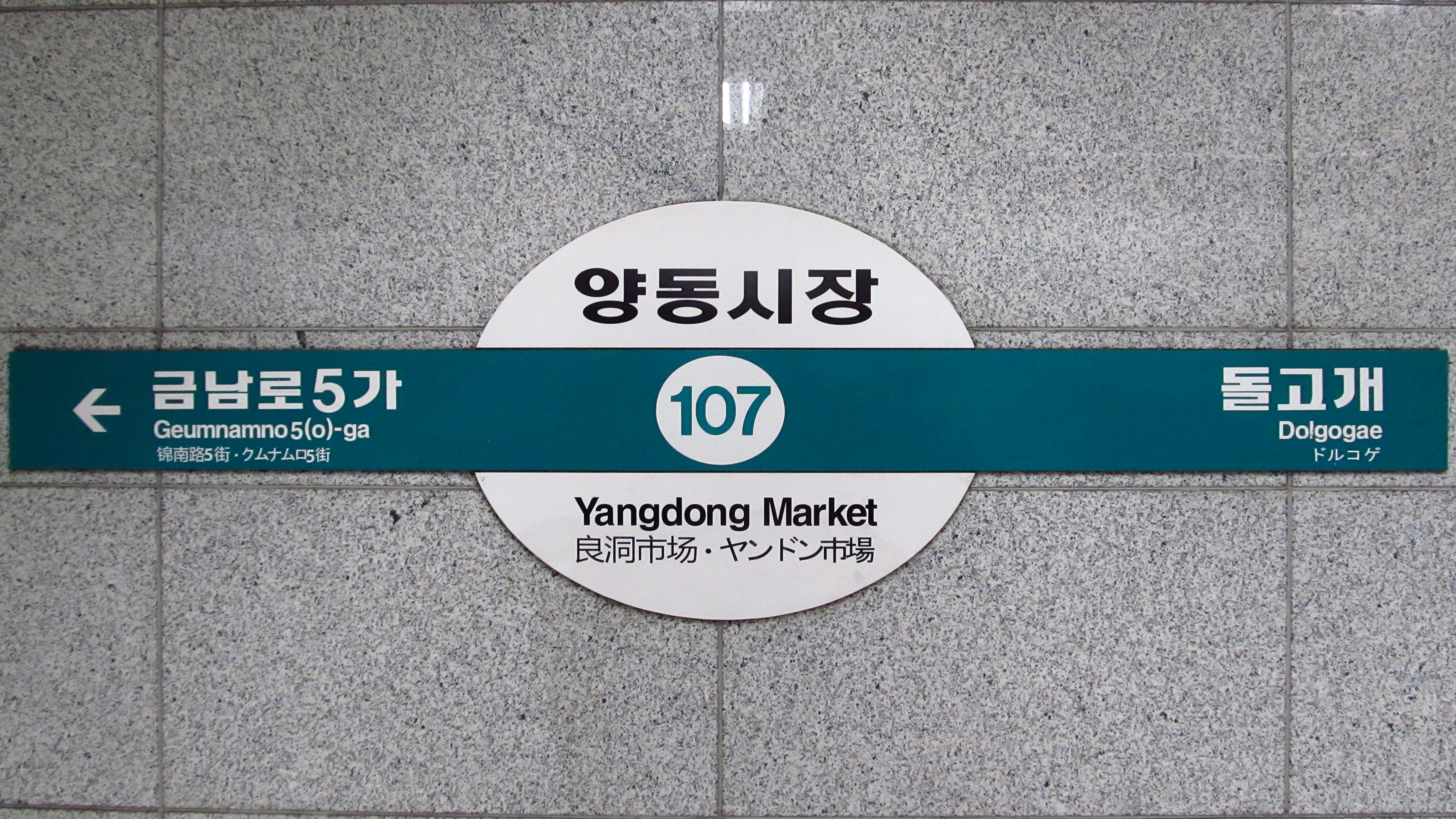

Korean name
- Hangul: 양동시장역
- Hanja: 良洞市場驛
- Revised Romanization: Yangdong sijang yeok
- McCune–Reischauer: Yangdong sijang yŏk

General information
- Location: Seo-dong, Seo District]], Gwangju; South Korea
- Coordinates: 35°09′16″N 126°54′05″E
- Operator: Gwangju Metropolitan Rapid Transit Corporation
- Line: Line 1
- Platforms: 2
- Tracks: 2

Construction
- Structure type: Underground

Other information
- Station code: 107

History
- Opened: April 28, 2004

Services
Preceding station	Gwangju Metro	Following station
Geumnamno 5(o)-ga towards Nokdong	Line 1	Dolgogae towards Pyeongdong
Location

Yangdong Market station (Korean: 양동시장역; Hanja: 良洞市場驛) is a Station on Gwangju Metro Line 1 located in Seo-dong, Seo District, Gwangju, South Korea.

The station is named after the nearby Yangdong Market.

== Station layout ==
G	Street Level	Exits
L1	Concourse	Faregates, Ticketing Machines, Station Control
L2; Platforms	Side platform, doors will open on the right
L2; Platforms	Southbound	← Line 1 toward Nokdong (Geumnamno 5(o)-ga)
L2; Platforms	Northbound	→ Line 1 toward Pyeongdong (Dolgogae) →
L2; Platforms	Side platform, doors will open on the right

== Exits ==
Exit No.	Image	Destinations
1		Yangdong Market; Kumho Apartment; Next Co., Ltd. Yangdong Market North Open Market
2		Yangdong Market
3		Yangdong Public Security Center; Gwangju Yangdong Elementary School; Gwangju Seo-gu Welfare Center
4		Dongdong Intersection; Imdong Intersection; Yangdong Administrative Welfare Center; Gwangju Bukseong Middle School; Gwangju Bank North Branch
