= Culture Complex station =

Metro station in Gwangju, South Korea

104 문화전당 (구도청) Culture Complex (Old Provincial Office)
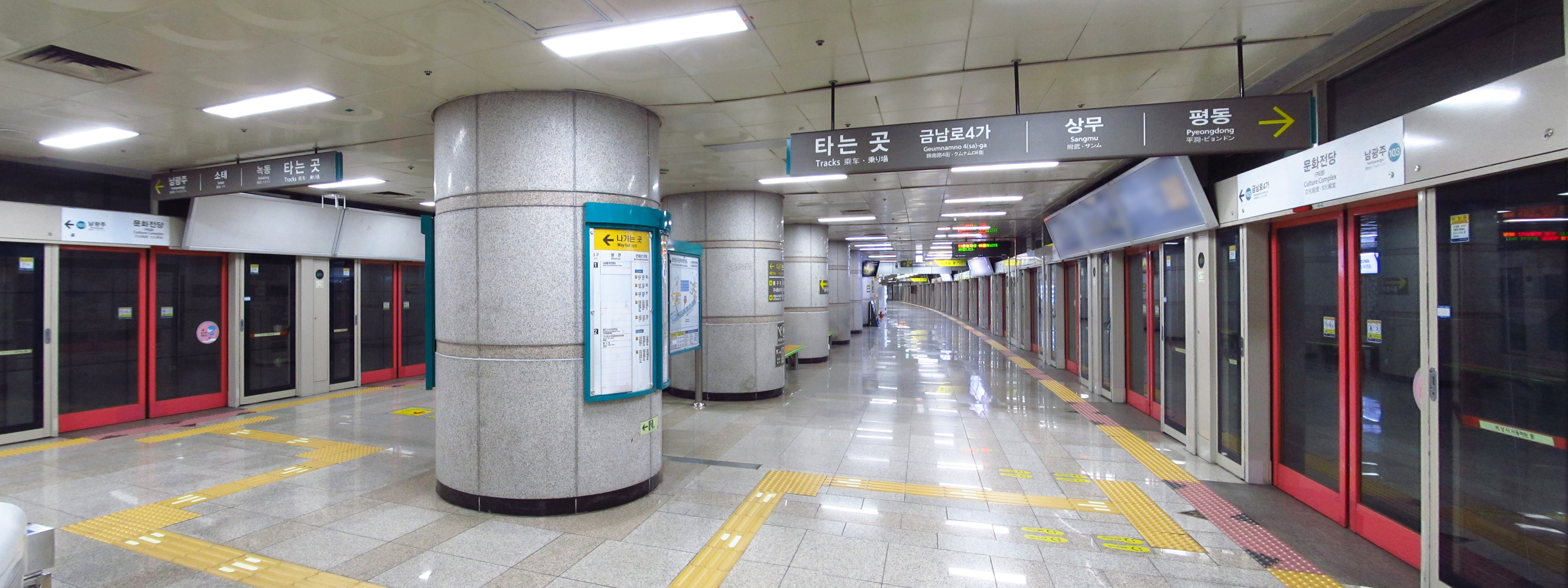

Korean name
- Hangul: 문화전당역
- Hanja: 文化殿堂驛
- Revised Romanization: Munhwa Jeondang-yeok
- McCune–Reischauer: Munhwa Chŏndang-yŏk

General information
- Location: Gwangsan-dong, Dong District, Gwangju; South Korea
- Coordinates: 35°08′47″N 126°55′11″E
- Operator: Gwangju Metropolitan Rapid Transit Corporation
- Line: Line 1
- Platforms: 1
- Tracks: 2

Construction
- Structure type: Underground

Other information
- Station code: 104

History
- Opened: April 28, 2004

Services
Preceding station	Gwangju Metro	Following station
Namgwangju towards Nokdong	Line 1	Geumnamno 4(sa)-ga towards Pyeongdong
Location

Culture Complex (Korean: 문화전당역; Hanja: 文化殿堂驛) is an underground station of the Gwangju Metro Line 1 in Gwangsan-dong, Dong District, Gwangju, South Korea.

== Station Layout ==
G	Street Level	Exits
L1	Concourse	Faregates, Ticketing Machines, Station Control
L2; Platforms	Southbound	← Line 1 toward Nokdong (Namgwangju)
L2; Platforms	Island platform, doors will open on the left
L2; Platforms	Northbound	→ Line 1 toward Pyeongdong (Geumnamno 4(sa)-ga) →
