= Geumnamno 4(sa)-ga station =

Metro station in Gwangju, South Korea

105 금남로4가 (하나은행 광주금융) Geumnamno 4(sa)-ga (Hana Bank)
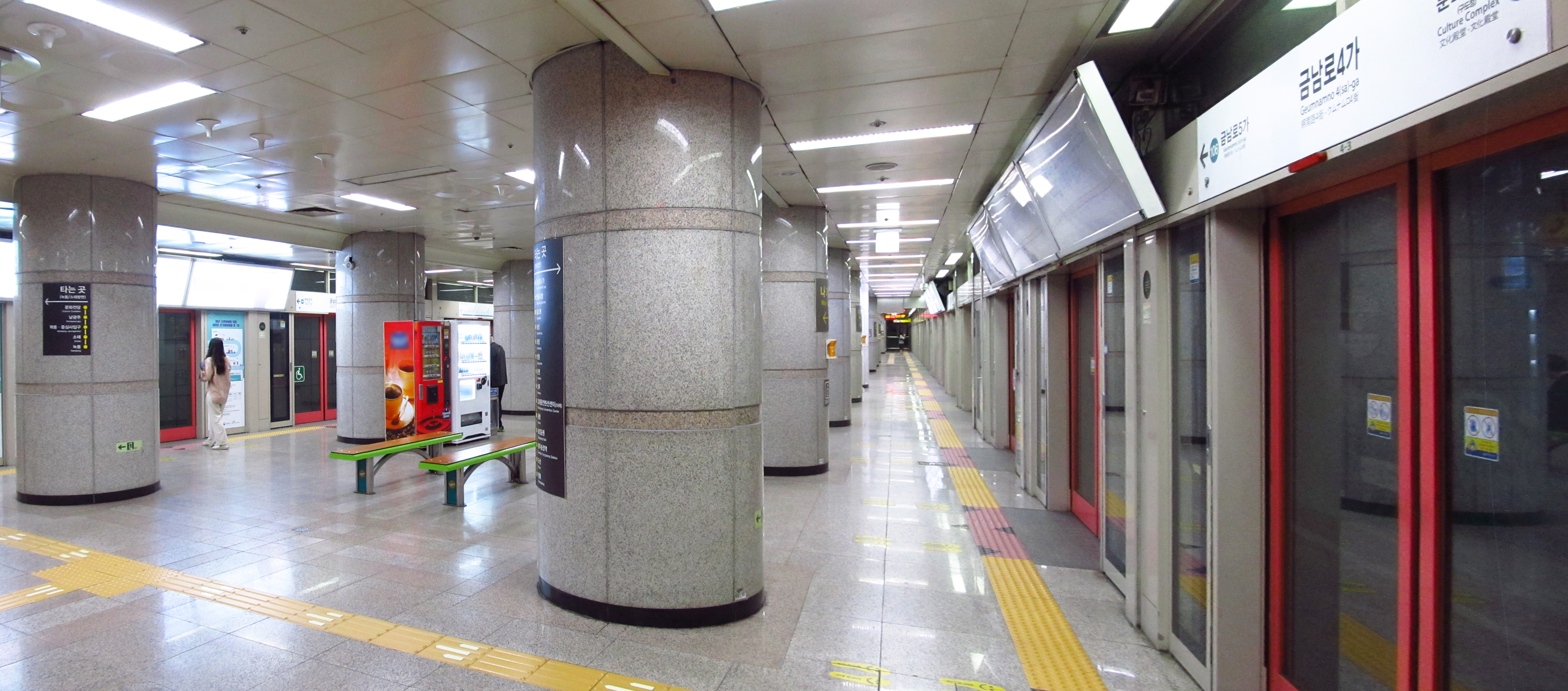

Korean name
- Hangul: 금남로4가역
- Hanja: 錦南路4街驛
- Revised Romanization: Geumnamno sa-ga-yeok
- McCune–Reischauer: Kŭmnamno sa-ga-yŏk

General information
- Location: Chunggeum-dong, Dong District, Gwangju; South Korea
- Coordinates: 35°09′03″N 126°54′51″E
- Operator: Gwangju Metropolitan Rapid Transit Corporation
- Line: Line 1
- Platforms: 1
- Tracks: 2

Construction
- Structure type: Underground

Other information
- Station code: 105

History
- Opened: April 28, 2004

Services
| Preceding station | Gwangju Metro | Following station |
|---|---|---|
| Culture Complex towards Nokdong | Line 1 | Geumnamno 5(o)-ga towards Pyeongdong |
Location

Geumnamno 4(sa)-ga station (Korean: 금남로4가역) is a station of Gwangju Metro Line 1 in Chunggeum-dong, Dong District, Gwangju, South Korea.

== Station Layout ==
| G | Street Level | Exits |
| L1 | Concourse | Faregates, Ticketing Machines, Station Control |
| L2; Platforms | Southbound | ← Line 1 toward Nokdong (Culture Complex) |
| L2; Platforms | Island platform, doors will open on the left |
| L2; Platforms | Northbound | → Line 1 toward Pyeongdong (Geumnamno 5(o)-ga) → |
