= Dosan station =

Metro station in Gwangju, South Korea

118 도산 Dosan
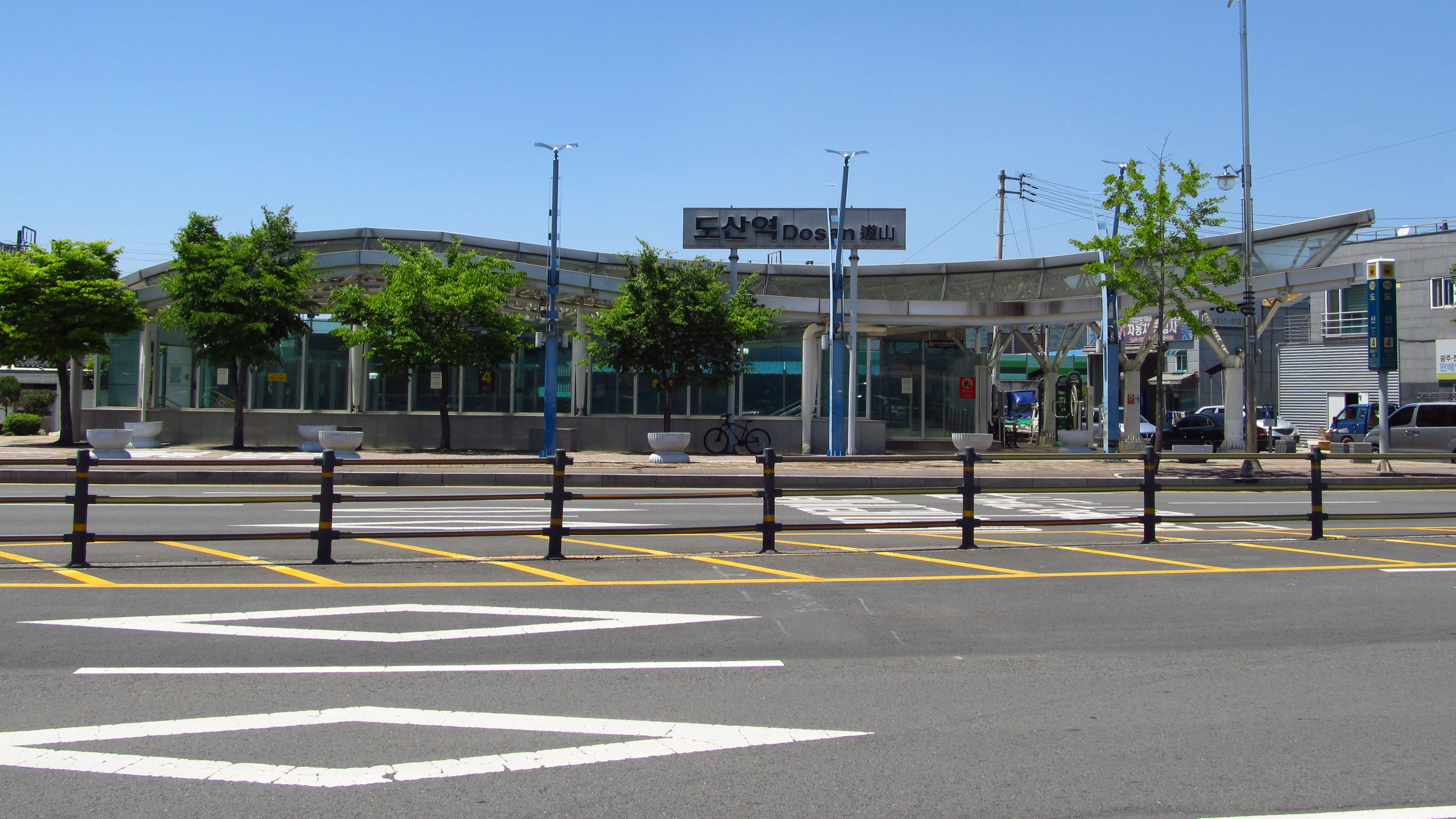

Korean name
- Hangul: 도산역
- Hanja: 道山驛
- Revised Romanization: Dosan-yeok
- McCune–Reischauer: Tosan-yŏk

General information
- Location: Dosan-dong, Gwangsan District, Gwangju; South Korea
- Coordinates: 35°07′54″N 126°47′17″E
- Operator: Gwangju Metropolitan Rapid Transit Corporation
- Line: Line 1
- Platforms: 2
- Tracks: 2

Construction
- Structure type: Underground

Other information
- Station code: 118

History
- Opened: April 11, 2008

Services
| Preceding station | Gwangju Metro | Following station |
|---|---|---|
| Gwangju Songjeong Station towards Nokdong | Line 1 | Pyeongdong Terminus |
Location

Dosan station (Korean: 도산역) is an underground station of Gwangju Metro Line 1 in Dosan-dong, Gwangsan District, Gwangju, South Korea. This is the last underground station for the east before proceed to the ground station name Pyeongdong station.

== Station layout ==
| G | Street Level | Exits |
| L1 | Concourse | Faregates, Ticketing Machines, Station Control |
| L2; Platforms | Side platform, doors will open on the right |
| L2; Platforms | Southbound | ← Line 1 toward Nokdong (Gwangju Songjeong Station) |
| L2; Platforms | Northbound | → Line 1 toward Pyeongdong (Terminus) → |
| L2; Platforms | Side platform, doors will open on the right |

== Connections ==
Dosan station is accessible by buses that plies to Naju.
