= Gwangju Metro Line 1 =

Subway line in Gwangju, South Korea

Line 1
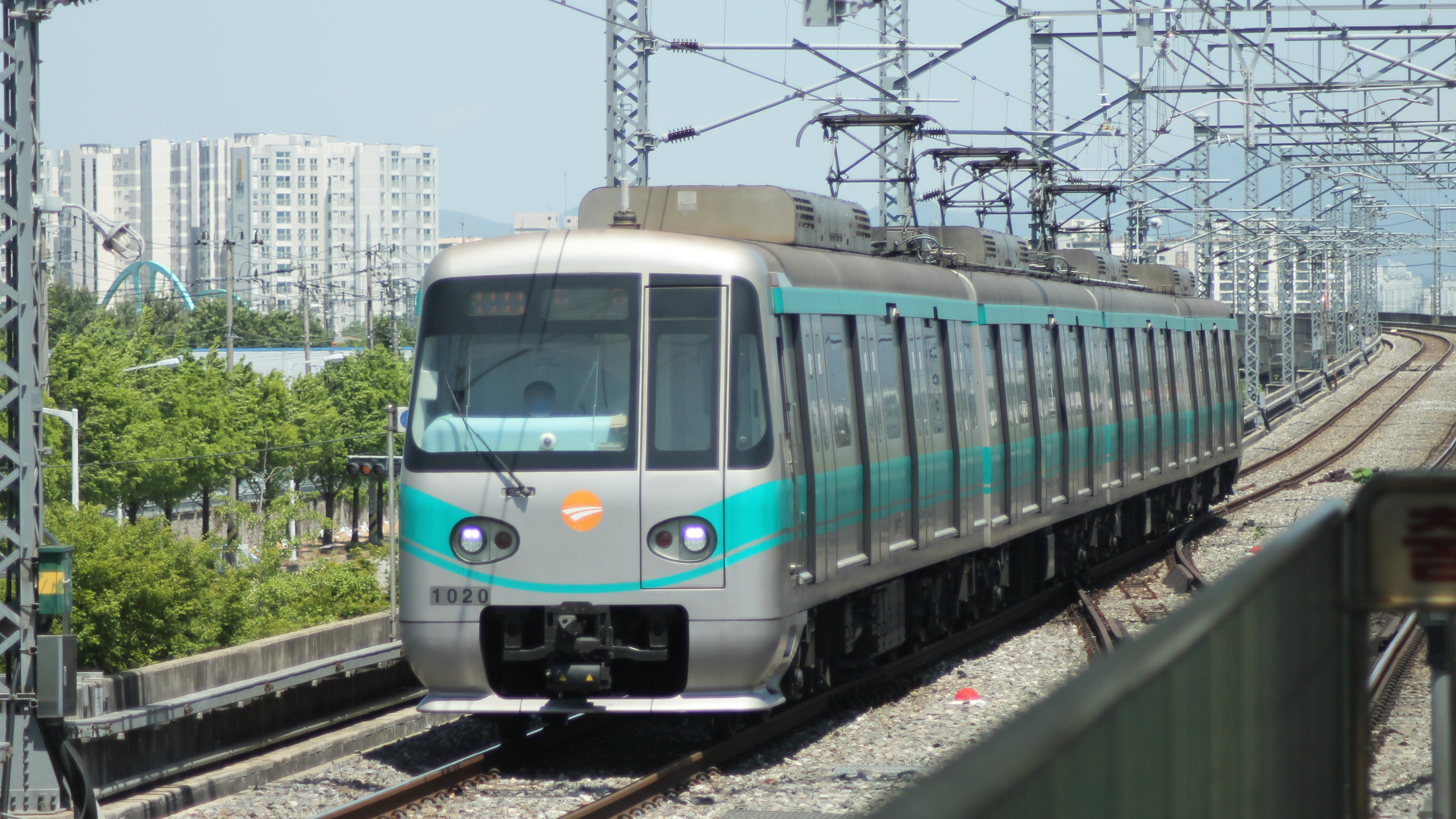

Overview
- Native name: 1호선(1號線); Il Hoseon
- Status: Operational
- Termini: Nokdong; Pyeongdong
- Stations: 20

Service
- Type: Rapid transit
- System: Gwangju Metro
- Services: 1
- Operator: Gwangju Metropolitan Rapid Transit Corporation

History
- Opened: 28 April 2004; 22 years ago
- Last extension: 2008

Technical
- Line length: 20.6 km (12.8 mi)
- Num of tracks: 2
- Track gauge: 1,435 mm (4 ft 8 1/2 in)
- Electrification: 1,500 V DC, 25 kV AC 60 Hz overhead line

Gwangju Metro Line 1 is a rapid transit line in Gwangju, South Korea, operated by the Gwangju Metropolitan Rapid Transit Corporation (GRTC, or Gwangju Metro). It connects Nokdong station in Dong-gu at its eastern terminus to Pyeongdong station in Gwangsan-gu in the west, via the central business district and Gwangju Airport. On maps, it is designated by teal (●).

The line began operations in 2004, making Gwangju the fifth South Korean city with a rapid transit system.

== History ==
- August 28, 1996: Ground breaking ceremony for the Line 1
- April 28, 2004: Line 1 partially opened (Nokdong ↔ Sangmu)
- April 11, 2008: Line 1 fully opened (Nokdong ↔ Pyeongdong)

== Stations ==
As of 2021 Line 1 consists of twenty stations. Most trains operate between Pyeongdong and Sotae, with about one service per hour continuing to Nokdong station.

All stations are in Gwangju.

Station Number	Station Name English	Station Name Hangul	Station Name Hanja	Transfer	Distance in km	Total Distance	Location
100	Nokdong	녹동	鹿洞		---	0.0	Dong (East)
101	Sotae	소태	所台		1.9	1.9	Dong (East)
102	Hakdong·Jeungsimsa	학동·증심사입구	鶴洞·證心寺入口		1.1	3.0	Dong (East)
103	Namgwangju	남광주	南光州		0.9	3.9	Dong (East)
104	Culture Complex	문화전당	文化殿堂		0.9	4.8	Dong (East)
105	Geumnamno 4(sa)-ga	금남로4가	錦南路4街		0.7	5.5	Dong (East)
106	Geumnamno 5(o)-ga	금남로5가	錦南路5街		0.6	6.1	Dong (East)
107	Yangdong Market	양동시장	良洞市場		1.0	7.1	Seo (West)
108	Dolgogae	돌고개	돌고개		0.6	7.7	Nam (South)
109	Nongseong	농성	農城		1.2	8.9	Seo (West)
110	Hwajeong	화정	花亭		0.7	9.6	Seo (West)
111	Ssangchon	쌍촌	雙村		0.6	10.2	Seo (West)
112	Uncheon	운천	雲泉		0.9	11.1	Seo (West)
113	Sangmu	상무	尙武		1.1	12.2	Seo (West)
114	Kim Daejung Convention Center	김대중컨벤션센터	金大中컨벤션센터		0.7	12.9	Seo (West)
115	Airport	공항	空港		2.9	15.8	Gwangsan
116	Songjeong Park	송정공원	松汀公園		1.1	16.9	Gwangsan
117	Gwangju Songjeong Station	광주송정역	光州松汀驛	Honam Line; Honam High Speed Railway (2017) Saemaeul-ho services Mugunghwa-ho services	1.1	18.0	Gwangsan
118	Dosan	도산	道山		0.7	18.7	Gwangsan
119	Pyeongdong	평동	平洞		1.9	20.6	Gwangsan

== Plan to extend Line 1 ==
The Gwangju City Government has a plan to extend the current Line 1 southward to Hwasun and northward to Naju. Recently, the Presidential Committee on Balanced National Development promised to include the Line 1 extension in its '5+2 extensive economic zone' project.

== See also ==
- Transportation in South Korea
