= Namgwangju station (1930–2000) =

Defunct railway station in South Korea

남광주
Namgwangju
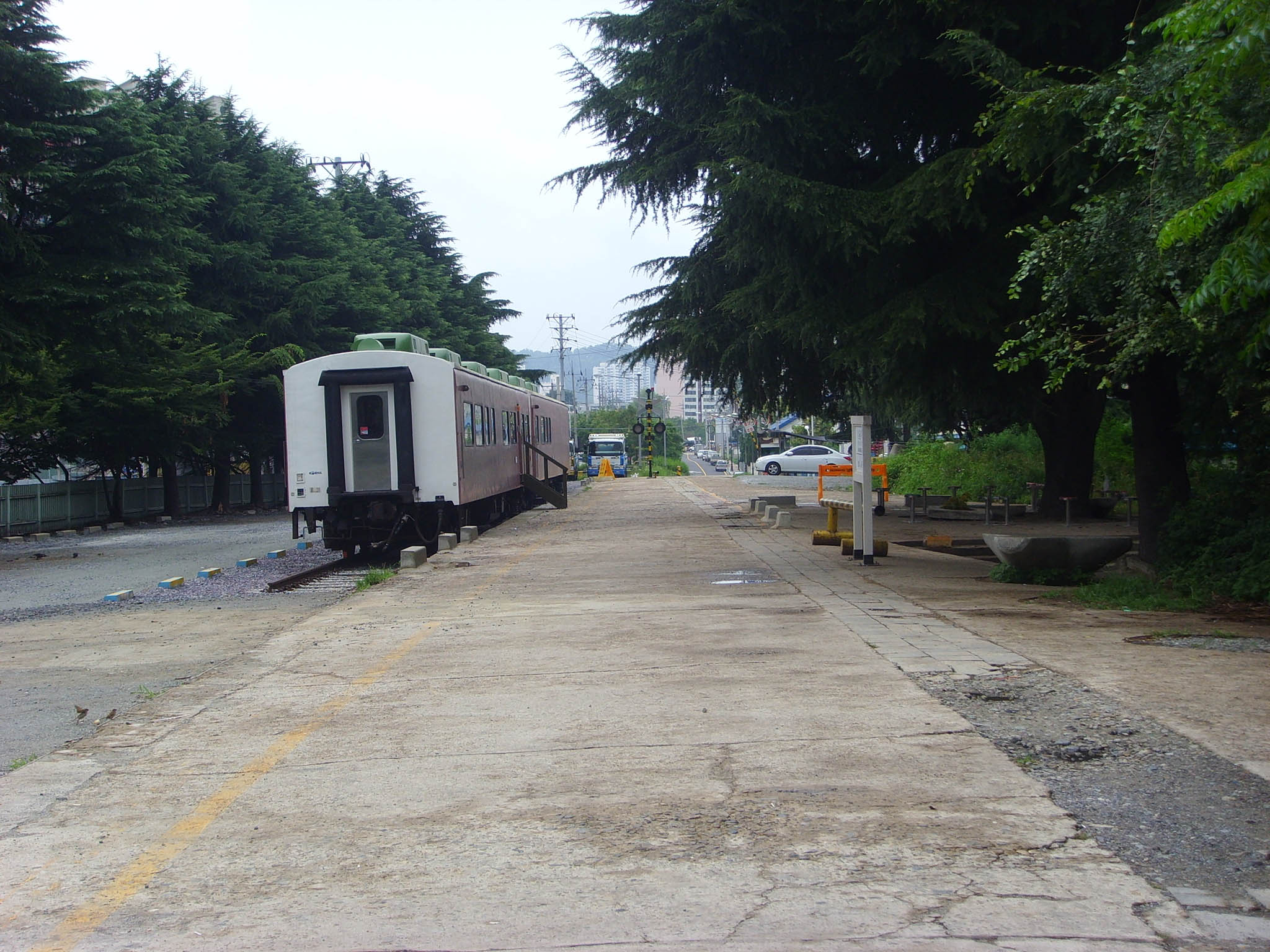

Korean name
- Hangul: 남광주역
- Hanja: 南光州驛
- Revised Romanization: Namgwangjuyeok
- McCune–Reischauer: Namgwangjuyŏk

General information
- Location: Hak-dong 55, Dong-gu, Gwangju
- Coordinates: 35°8′19.63″N 126°55′18.15″E
- Operator: Korail
- Line: Gyeongjeon Line

History
- Opened: December 25, 1930
- Closed: 10 August 2000
- Former names: Singwangju
Location

Namgwangju station (남광주역, means South Gwangju station) was a train station in Gyeongjeon Line, located in Gwangju, South Korea. The station was opened at December 25, 1930, as Singwangju station. Namgwangju station has successfully dispersed the passengers of Gwangju station, and grew as major station in Gwangju.

However, because Gyeongjeon line has moved outside of the city, Namgwangju station has closed, and moved the station function to Seogwangju station.

== History ==
- 1930/12/25 : Opened as Singwangju station
- 1938/04/01 : Changed name to Namgwangju station
- 1978/11/20 : Cargo carrying stopped
- 2000/08/10 : Station closed, moved the function to Seogwangju station.
- 2007/02/27 : Tour train (2 cars) came to stop momentary.

== Gallery ==
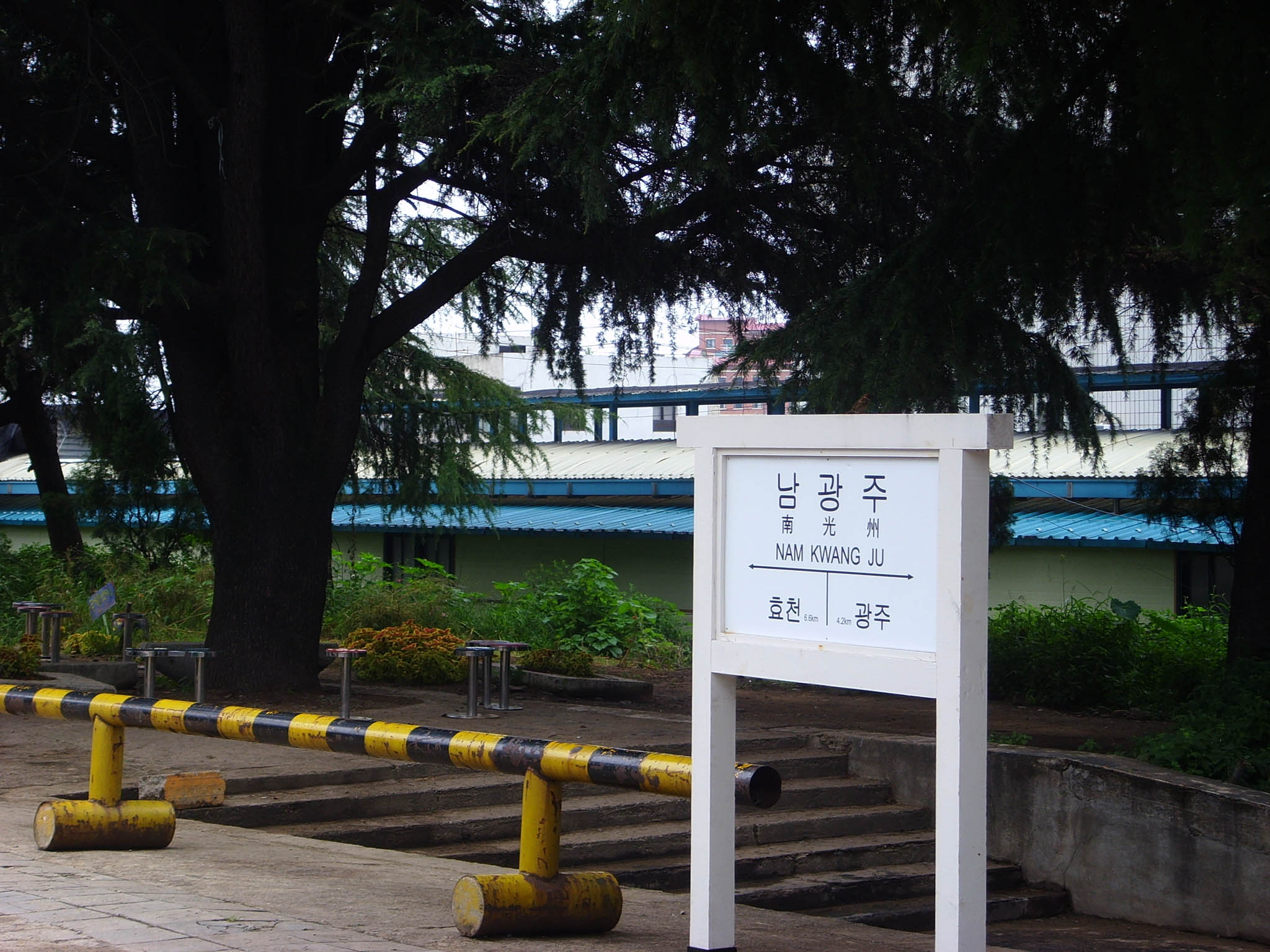
Station name sign

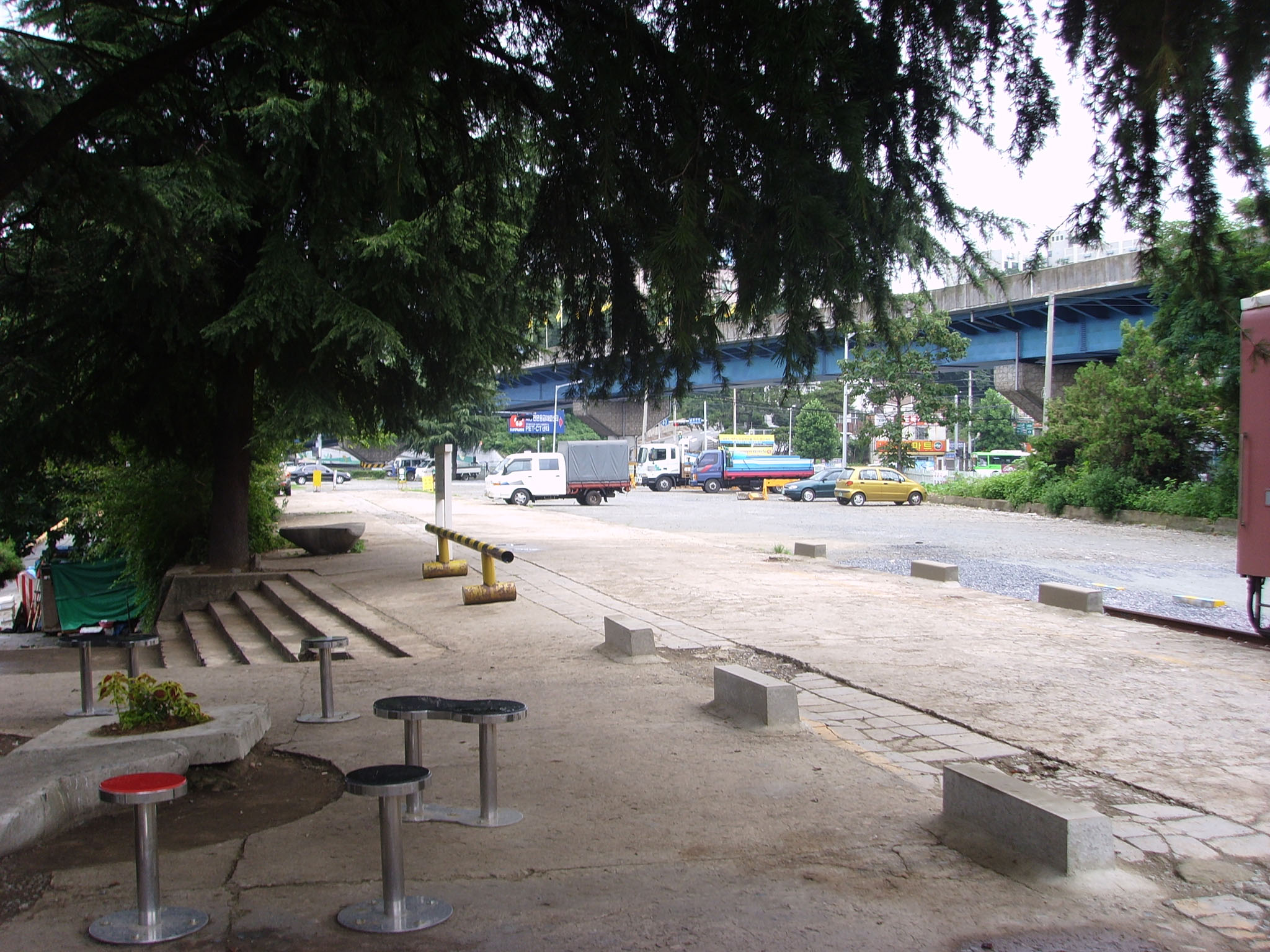
Direction to Gwangju station
