= Buk District, Jeonnam-Gwangju =

District of Jeonnam-Gwangju, South Korea

Coordinates: 35.17°N 126.91°E

Buk
- Autonomous District
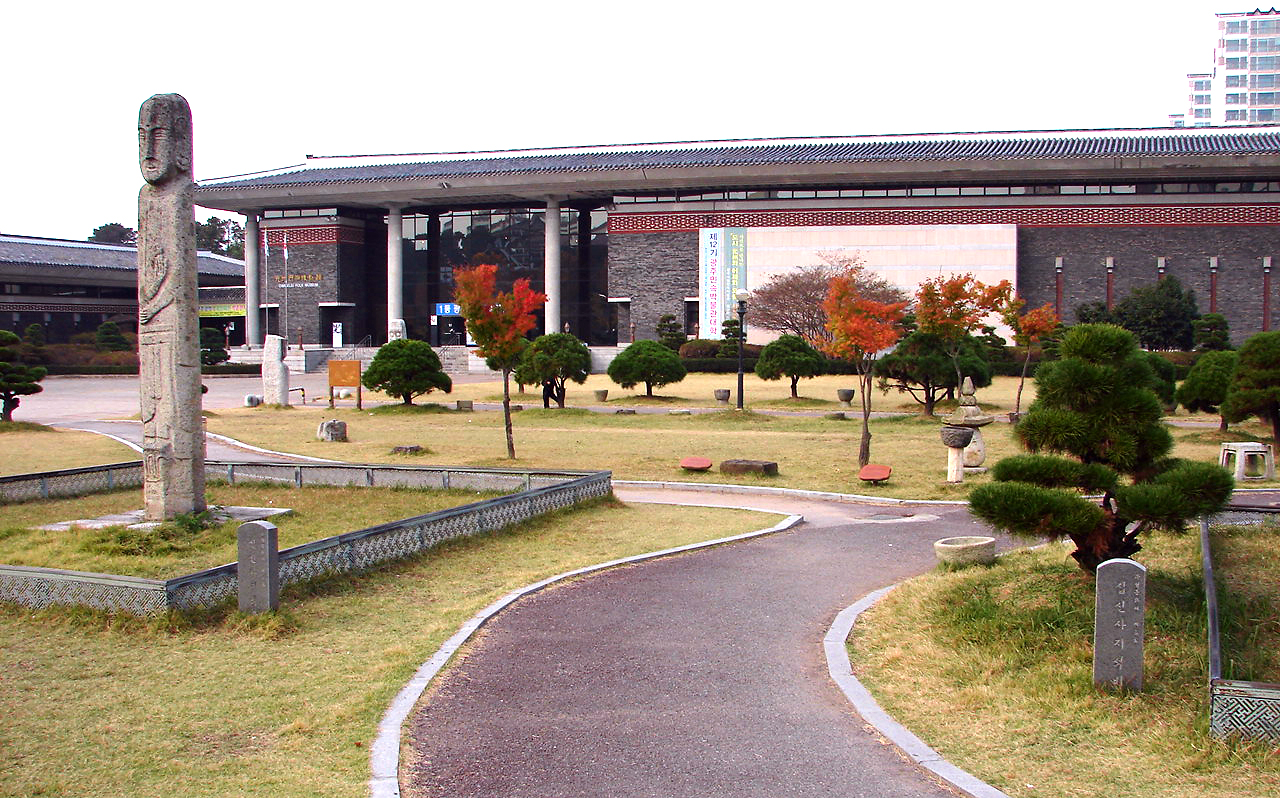
- Gwangju Folk Museum

- Flag
- Interactive map of Buk
- Country: South Korea
- Region: Honam
- Provincial-level city: Jeonnam-Gwangju

Government
  - Mayor: Mun, In

Area
  - Total: 120.26 km^{2} (46.43 sq mi)

Population (july 2025)
  - Total: 419,872
  - Density: 3,491.4/km^{2} (9,042.6/sq mi)
  - Dialect: Jeolla
- Website: Buk District Office

Korean name
- Hangul: 북구
- Hanja: 北區
- RR: Buk-gu
- MR: Puk-ku

Buk District (Korean: 북구; lit. 'North District') is a district of Jeonnam-Gwangju, South Korea.

It was once a part of the city of Gwangju, but on July 1, 2026, that city was merged into Jeonnam-Gwangju.

It elects two lawmakers for the South Korean National Assembly. Gwangju Station is here.

== Administrative divisions ==
- Dongnim-dong (동림동)
- Duam 1-dong (두암1동)
- Duam 2-dong (두암2동)
- Duam 3-dong (두암3동)
- Geonguk-dong (건국동)
- Ilgok-dong (일곡동)
- Im-dong (임동)
- Jungang-dong (중앙동)
- Jungheung 1-dong (중흥1동)
- Jungheung-2-dong (중흥2동)
- Jungheung-3-dong (중흥3동)
- Maegok-dong (매곡동)
- Munheung 1-dong (문흥1동)
- Munheung-2-dong (문흥2동)
- Munhwa-dong (문화동)
- Ochi 1-dong (오치1동)
- Ochi 2-dong (오치2동)
- Punghyang-dong (풍향동)
- Samgak-dong (삼각동)
- Seokgok-dong (석곡동)
- Sinan-dong (신안동)
- Unam 1-dong (운암1동)
- Unam 2-dong (운암2동)
- Unam 3-dong (운암3동)
- Usan-dong (우산동)
- Yongbong-dong (용봉동)

== Education ==
There are a significant number of elementary, middle, and high schools located in the area. In Gwangsan District, neighborhoods such as Cheomdan, Suwan, Sinchang, and Unnam have seen a population increase due to large-scale residential developments. However, the demand for high schools has not kept pace with the growing population. As a result, middle school students from Gwangsan District are often assigned to high schools in Buk District, which in turn forces Buk District's middle school students to be placed in high schools located in Seo District, Dong District, or Nam District. This situation occurs annually, and the Gwangju Metropolitan Office of Education has yet to propose an effective solution.

=== High schools ===
- Korea High School
- Gwangju Science Academy for the Gifted
- Gwangju Arts High School
- Gwangju Physical Education High School
- Gwangju Jeil High School
