= Nam District, Jeonnam-Gwangju =

District of Jeonnam-Gwangju, South Korea

Coordinates: 35.12°N 126.91°E

Nam
- Autonomous District
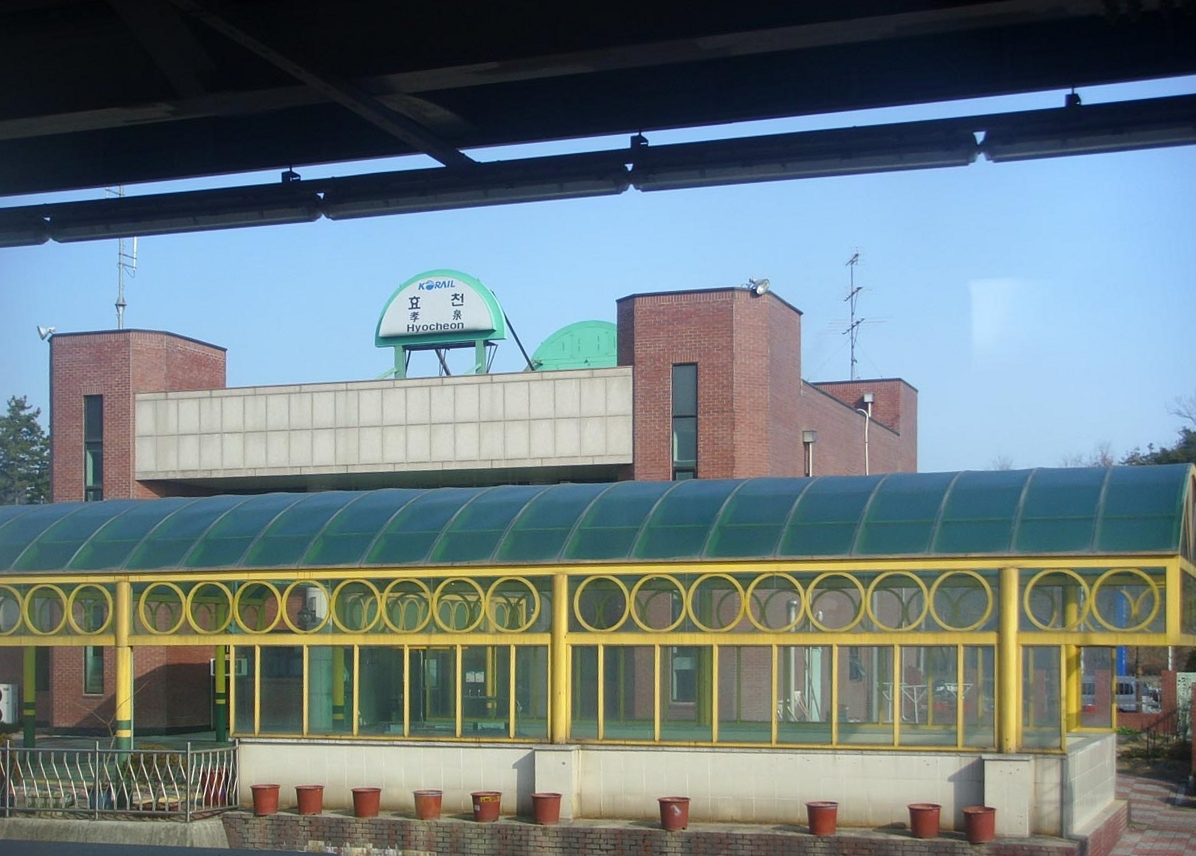

- Flag

- Country: South Korea
- Region: Honam
- Provincial-level city: Jeonnam-Gwangju

Government
  - Mayor: Kim Byeong-nae (김병내)

Area
  - Total: 61.03 km^{2} (23.56 sq mi)

Population (July 2025)
  - Total: 207,943
  - Density: 3,407/km^{2} (8,825/sq mi)
  - Dialect: Jeolla
- Website: Nam District Office

Korean name
- Hangul: 남구
- Hanja: 南區
- RR: Nam-gu
- MR: Nam-gu

Nam District (Korean: 남구) is a district of Jeonnam-Gwangju, South Korea.

The district was once part of the city of Gwangju, but on July 1, 2026, that city was dissolved and merged with South Jeolla Province into the provincial-level city of Jeonnam-Gwangju. Now, the district is directly managed under Jeonnam-Gwangju.

Among the districts of the former Gwangju, Nam has a relatively short history. It was established in 1995 after being separated from the Seo District, and a month later, it absorbed the Daechon Subdistrict Office from the Gwangsan District. As its name suggests, it is located in the southern part of Gwangju. To the east, it borders Dong District; to the northwest, it connects with Seo District; and at its westernmost points—Hwajang-dong, Yangchon-dong, and Seungchon-dong—it meets Gwangsan District. While it does not directly border Buk District, it faces it across Seo District's Yang-dong. To the south, it borders Nampyeong-eup in Naju, Jeollanam-do, serving as one of the gateways to Naju. In the 2000s, the Chilgujae Tunnel was constructed in Nodae-dong, creating a direct route to Hwasun County.

However, with the city's ongoing expansion, the urban center has shifted, leading to urban hollowing in this district, similar to Dong District.

== Subdivisions ==
There are 43 dongs, or neighborhoods in Nam District.
The dongs are:

1. 사동 Sa-dong
2. 구동 Gu-dong
3. 서동 Seo-dong
4. 월산동 Wolsan-dong (plus 4 and 5)
5. 월산4동
6. 월산5동
7. 백운동 Baegun-dong (plus 1 and 2)
8. 백운1동
9. 백운2동
10. 주월동 Juwol-dong (plus 1 and 2)
11. 주월1동
12. 주월2동
13. 노대동 Nodae-dong
14. 진월동 Jinwol-dong
15. 덕남동 Deongnam-dong
16. 행암동 Haengam-dong
17. 임암동 Imam-dong
18. 송하동 Songha-dong
19. 양림동 Yangnim-dong
20. 방림동 Bangnim-dong (plus 1 and 2)
21. 방림1동
22. 방림2동
23. 봉선동 Bongseon-dong (plus 1 and 2)
24. 봉선1동
25. 봉선2동
26. 구소동 Guso-dong
27. 양촌동 Yangchon-dong
28. 도금동 Dogeum-dong
29. 승촌동 Seungchon-dong
30. 지석동 Jiseok-dong
31. 압촌동 Apchon-dong
32. 화장동 Hwajang-dong
33. 칠석동 Chilseok-dong
34. 석정동 Seokjeong-dong
35. 신장동 Sinjang-dong
36. 양과동 Yanggwa-dong
37. 이장동 Ijeong-dong
38. 대지동 Daeji-dong
39. 월성동 Wolseong-dong
40. 사직동 Sajik-dong
41. 효덕동 Hyodeok-dong
42. 송암동 Songam-dong
43. 대촌동 Daechon-dong

== Education ==
- Gwangju University
- Songwon University, It was converted into a four-year university in 2012.
