= Seo District, Jeonnam-Gwangju =

District of Jeonnam-Gwangju, South Korea

Coordinates: 35°09′00″N 126°53′30″E

Seo
- Autonomous District
- Flag

- Country: South Korea
- Region: Honam
- Provincial-level city: Jeonnam-Gwangju

Government
  - Mayor: Kim I-gang (김이강)

Area
  - Total: 47.74 km^{2} (18.43 sq mi)

Population (2024)
  - Total: 280,045
  - Density: 5,866/km^{2} (15,190/sq mi)
  - Dialect: Jeolla
- Website: Seo District Office

Korean name
- Hangul: 서구
- Hanja: 西區
- RR: Seo-gu
- MR: Sŏ-gu

Seo District (Korean: 서구) is a district of Jeonnam-Gwangju, South Korea.

The district was once part of the city of Gwangju, but on July 1, 2026, that city was dissolved and merged with South Jeolla Province into the provincial-level city of Jeonnam-Gwangju. Now, the district is directly managed under Jeonnam-Gwangju.

Its city hall and a convention center are famous landmarks in the district.

== Administrative divisions ==
1. Byeokjin-dong (벽진동; 碧津洞)
2. Chipyeong-dong (치평동; 治平洞)
3. Deokhong-dong (덕홍동)
4. Geumho-dong (금호동; 金湖洞)
5. Gwangcheon-dong (광천동; 光川洞)
6. Hwajeong-dong (화정동; 花井洞)
7. Maewol-dong (매월동; 梅月洞)
8. Mareuk-dong (마륵동; 馬勒洞)
9. Naebang-dong (내방동; 內防洞)
10. Nongseong-dong (농성동; 農城洞)
11. Pongam-dong (퐁암동)
12. Seha-dong (세하동; 細荷洞)
13. Seochang-dong (서창동; 西倉洞)
14. Ssangchon-dong (쌍촌동; 雙村洞)
15. Yang-dong (양동; 良洞)
16. Yongdu-dong (용두동; 龍頭洞)
17. Yuchon-dong (유촌동; 柳村洞)

== Economy ==
Due to the influence of Kia's Gwangju Plant (Autoland Gwangju), this area is considered the most affluent in Gwangju. Centered around the Sangmu District, where the Gwangju Metropolitan City Hall is located, it serves as the administrative and economic core of the city. With key hubs like U-Square and the Sangmu District, it also boasts the most thriving commercial sector in Gwangju.
