= Pyeongdong station =

Metro station in Gwangju, South Korea

119 평동 Pyeongdong
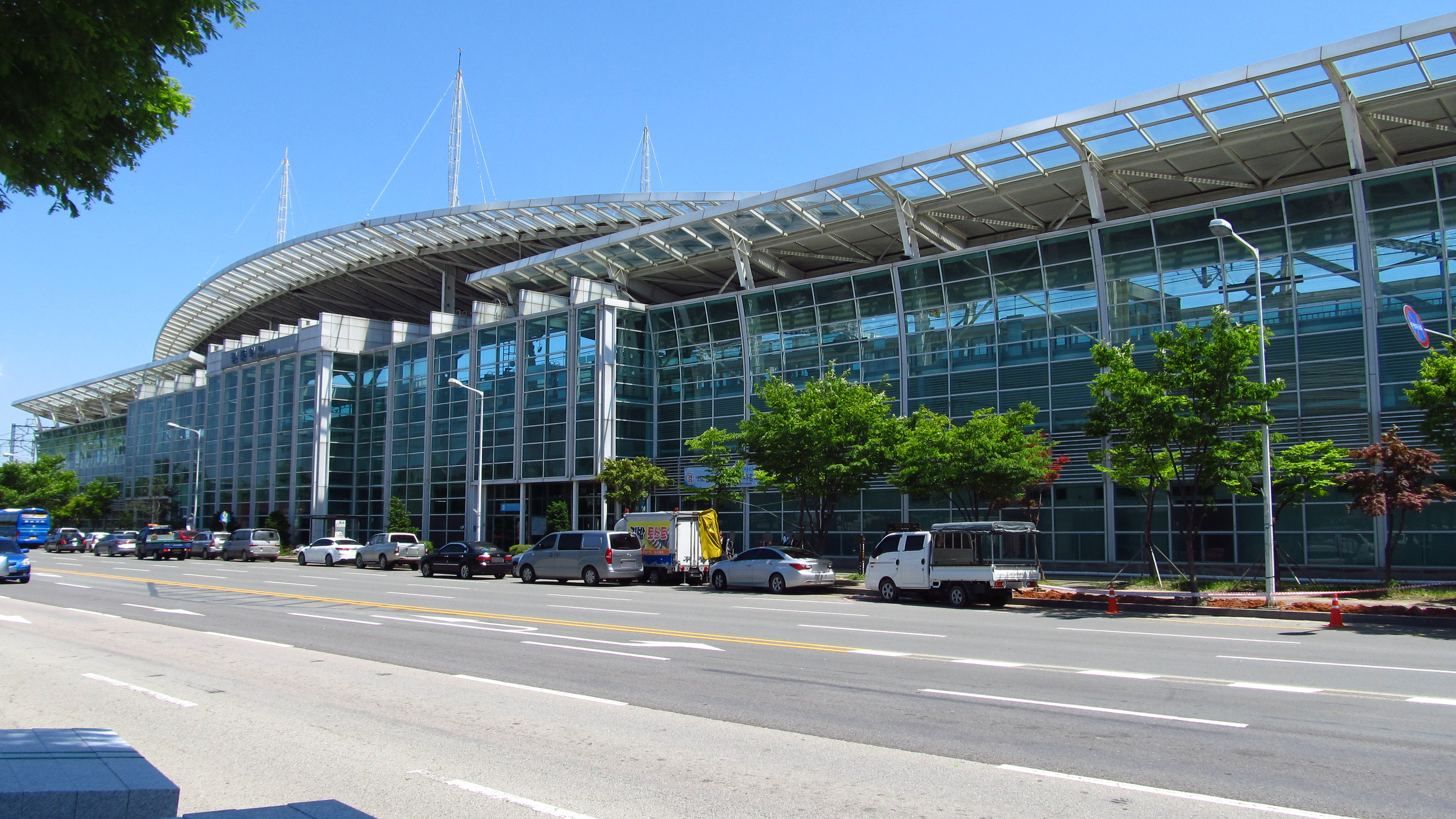
- Station Building

Korean name
- Hangul: 평동역
- Hanja: 平洞驛
- Revised Romanization: Pyeongdong yeok
- McCune–Reischauer: P'yŏngtong yŏk

General information
- Location: Woljeon-dong, Gwangsan District, Gwangju; South Korea
- Coordinates: 35°07′29″N 126°46′10″E
- Operator: Gwangju Metropolitan Rapid Transit Corporation
- Line: Line 1
- Platforms: 2
- Tracks: 2

Construction
- Structure type: Aboveground

Other information
- Station code: 119

History
- Opened: April 11, 2008

Services
Preceding station	Gwangju Metro	Following station
Dosan towards Nokdong	Line 1	Terminus
Location

Pyeongdong station (Korean: 평동역; Hanja: 平洞驛) is a station of Gwangju Metro Line 1 in Woljeon-dong, Gwangsan District, Gwangju, South Korea. It is located near at the Okdong Vehicle Office in Pyeong-dong. This station is only a ground section. In the middle of the night, the five formations are rushing at Okdong Station.

== Station layout ==
G	Street Level	Exits
L1	Concourse	Faregates, Ticketing Machines, Station Control
L2; Platforms	Side platform, doors will open on the right
L2; Platforms	Southbound	← Line 1 toward Nokdong (Dosan)
L2; Platforms	Northbound	→ Line 1 (Alighting Passengers Only) toward Okdong Depot →
L2; Platforms	Side platform, doors will open on the right
