= Gwangju Metro =

South Korean railway system

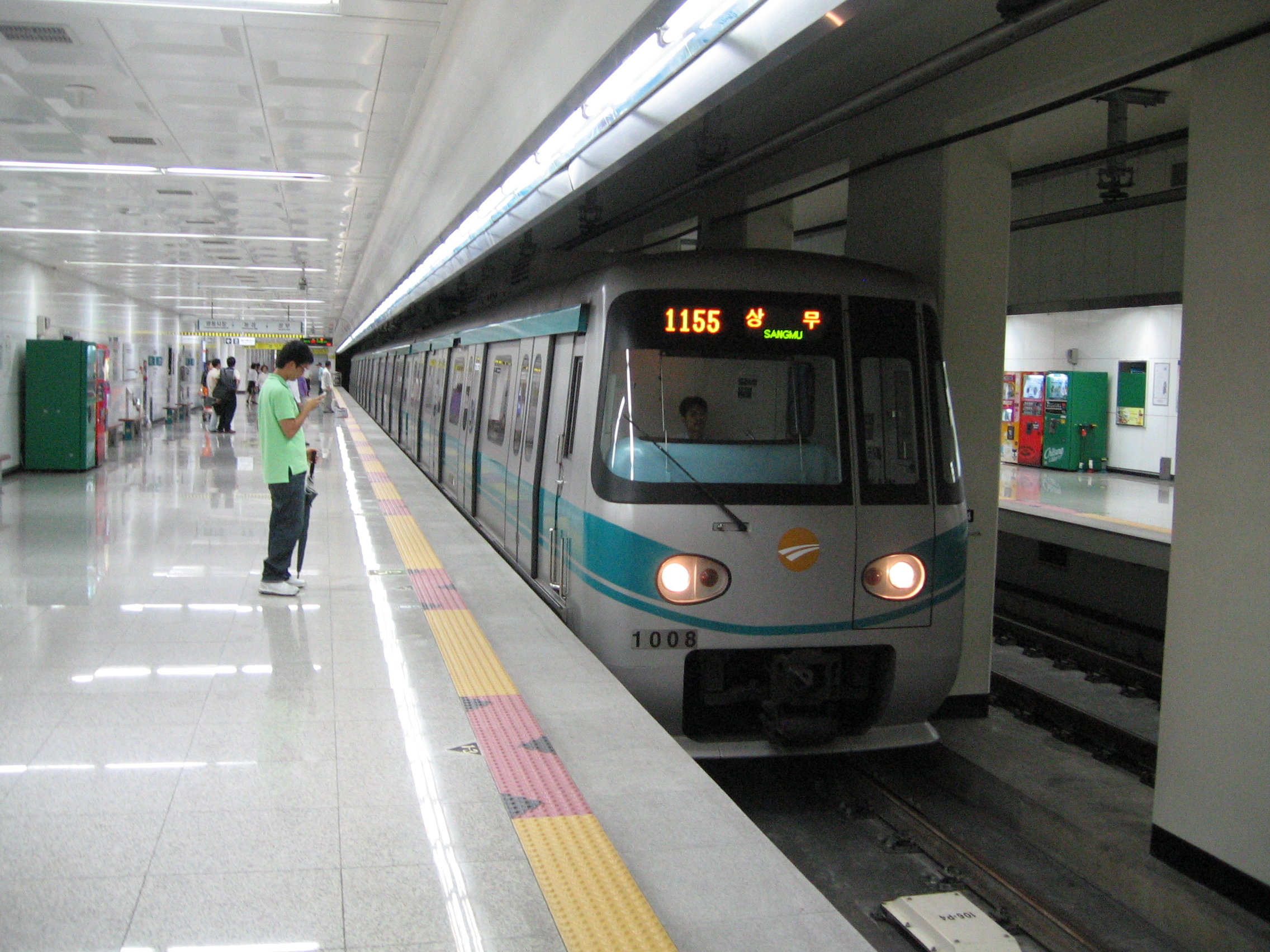

Overview
- Locale: Gwangju, South Korea
- Transit type: Rapid transit
- Number of lines: 1
- Number of stations: 20

Operation
- Began operation: 28 April 2004; 22 years ago
- Operator: Gwangju Metropolitan Rapid Transit Corporation

Technical
- System length: 20.1 km (12.5 mi)
- Track gauge: 1,435 mm (4 ft 8 1/2 in)
System map

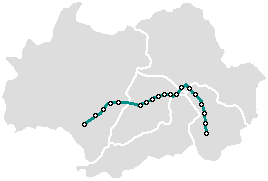

- Gwangju Metro
- Hangul: 광주 도시철도
- Hanja: 光州都市鐵道
- RR: Gwangju dosi cheoldo
- MR: Kwangju tosi ch'ŏlto

Gwangju Metro (Korean: 광주 도시철도) is the rapid transit system of Gwangju, South Korea, operated by the Gwangju Metropolitan Rapid Transit Corporation (GRTC, or Gwangju Metro). The subway network first opened in 2004 with 14 stations. The Gwangju Metro consists of one line, serving 20 operational stations, and operating on 20.1 kilometres (12.5 mi) of route. It crosses both of the major rivers in Gwangju, the Yeongsan River and the Hwangryong River. Most of the system is underground, except for the sections between Sotae-Nokdong and Pyeongdong-Dosan.

== History ==
- April 28, 2004: Line 1 partially opened (Nokdong ↔ Sangmu)
- April 11, 2008: Line 1 fully opened (Nokdong ↔ Pyeongdong)

== Lines ==
Line Name English	Line Name Hangul	Starting Station(s)	Ending Station(s)	Stations	Total Length in km
Line 1	1호선	Nokdong	Pyeongdong	20	20.6

=== Line 1 ===
As of 2021 Line 1 consists of twenty stations. Most trains run between Pyeongdong and Sotae, with about one train per hour continuing towards Nokdong.

== Expansions and plans ==
=== Plan to extend Line 1 ===
The Gwangju City Government has a plan to extend the current Line 1 eastward to Hwasun and westward to Naju. In 2009, the Presidential Committee on Balanced National Development promised to include the Line 1 extension in its '5+2 extensive economic zone' project.

=== Line 2 ===
Line 2 (ko) was originally planned as a circle line, but the Gwangju City Government also considered a 'South-North type' as well. After the results of a public hearing conducted in 2019 construction started as originally planned, with the first section of the line being scheduled to open in 2023.

Phases 2 and 3 were scheduled to open in 2024 and 2025, initially. As of 2024, the opening of the first phase, a 20-station 17 km (11 mi) route to the south of the city, has been pushed back to 2026. The second phase, scheduled to open in 2029, will be 38 km (24 mi) long and will complete the loop. A third phase, 4.8 km (3.0 mi) long, will be a branch that serves the southeastern suburbs of Gwangju.

== See also ==
- Transport in South Korea
- List of metro systems
