= Nokdong station =

Railway station in Nokdong, South Korea

100 녹동 Nokdong
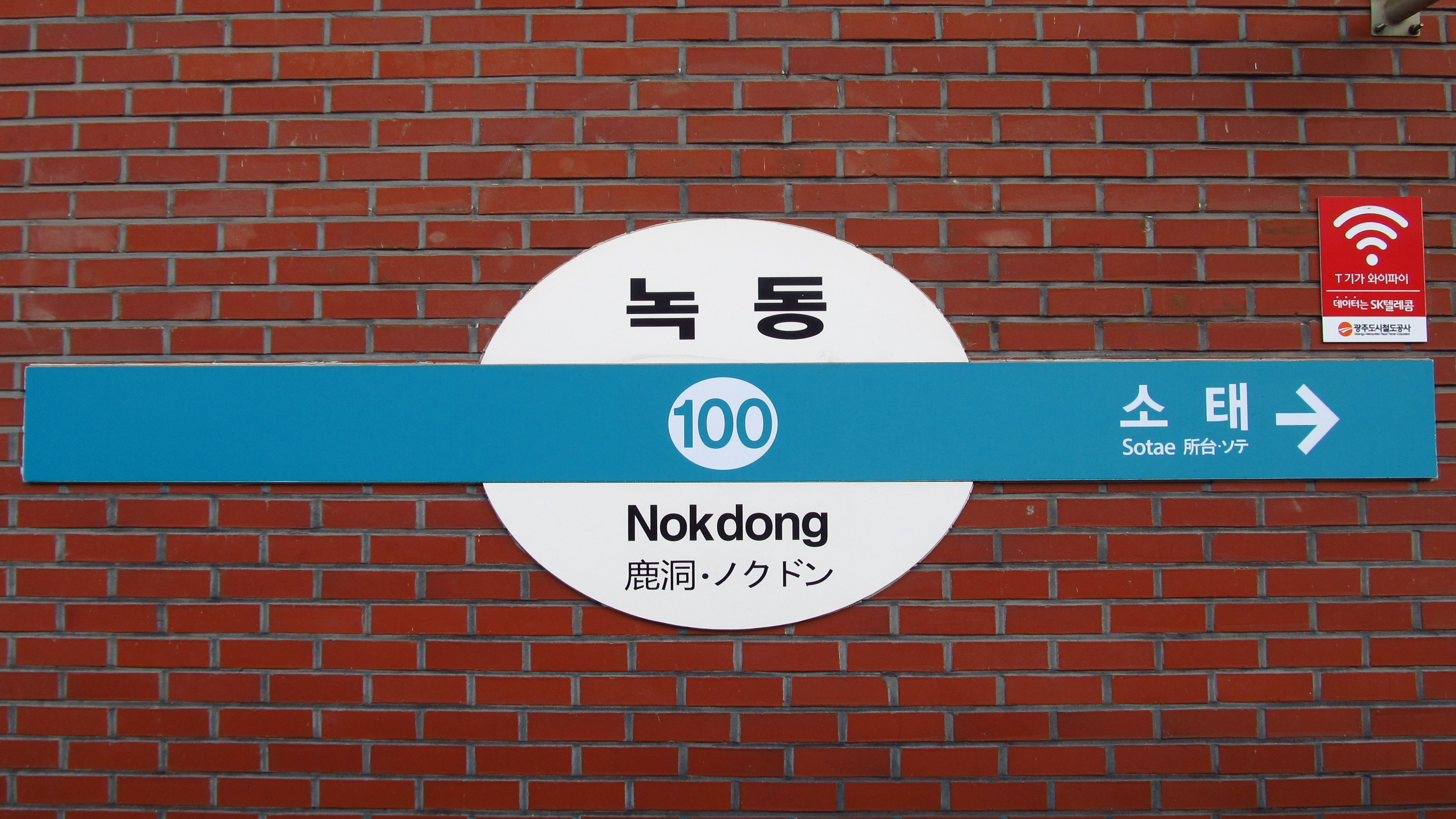

Korean name
- Hangul: 녹동역
- Hanja: 鹿洞驛
- Revised Romanization: Nokdongnyeok
- McCune–Reischauer: Noktongnyŏk

General information
- Location: Jiwon 2(i)-dong, Gwangju; South Korea
- Coordinates: 35°06′25″N 126°56′03″E
- Operator: Gwangju Metropolitan Rapid Transit Corporation
- Line: Line 1
- Platforms: 1
- Tracks: 1

Construction
- Structure type: Ground

Other information
- Station code: 100

History
- Opened: April 28, 2004

Services
Preceding station	Gwangju Metro	Following station
Terminus	Line 1	Sotae towards Pyeongdong
Location

Nokdong station is a railway station on Gwangju Metro Line 1 in Nokdong, South Korea. The station is located near at the depot.

== Station layout ==
G	Street Level	Exits
L1	Concourse	Faregates, Ticketing Machines, Station Control
L1; Platforms	Side platform, doors will open on the right
L1; Platforms	Northbound	→ Line 1 toward Pyeongdong (Sotae) →

== Gallery ==
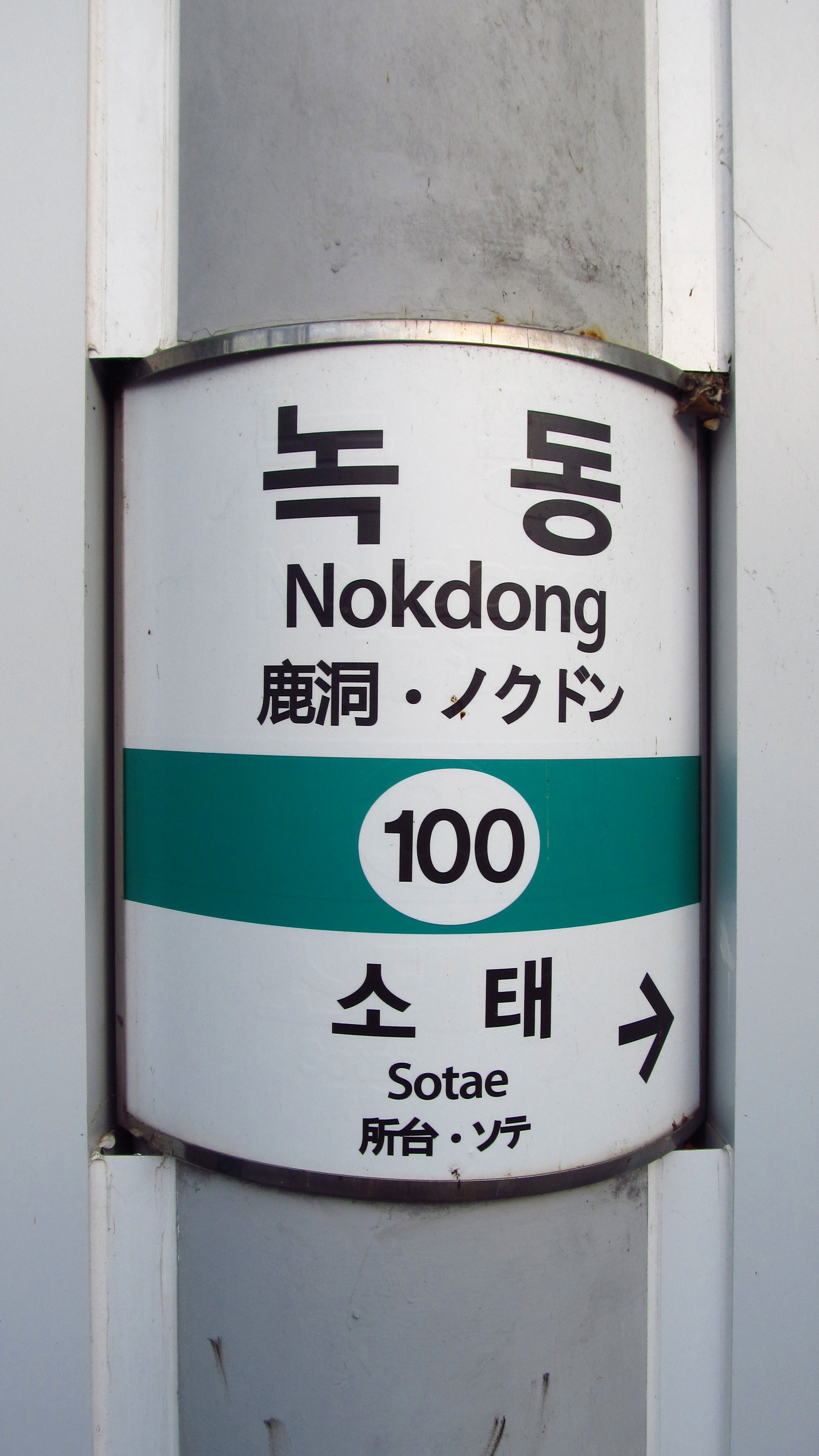

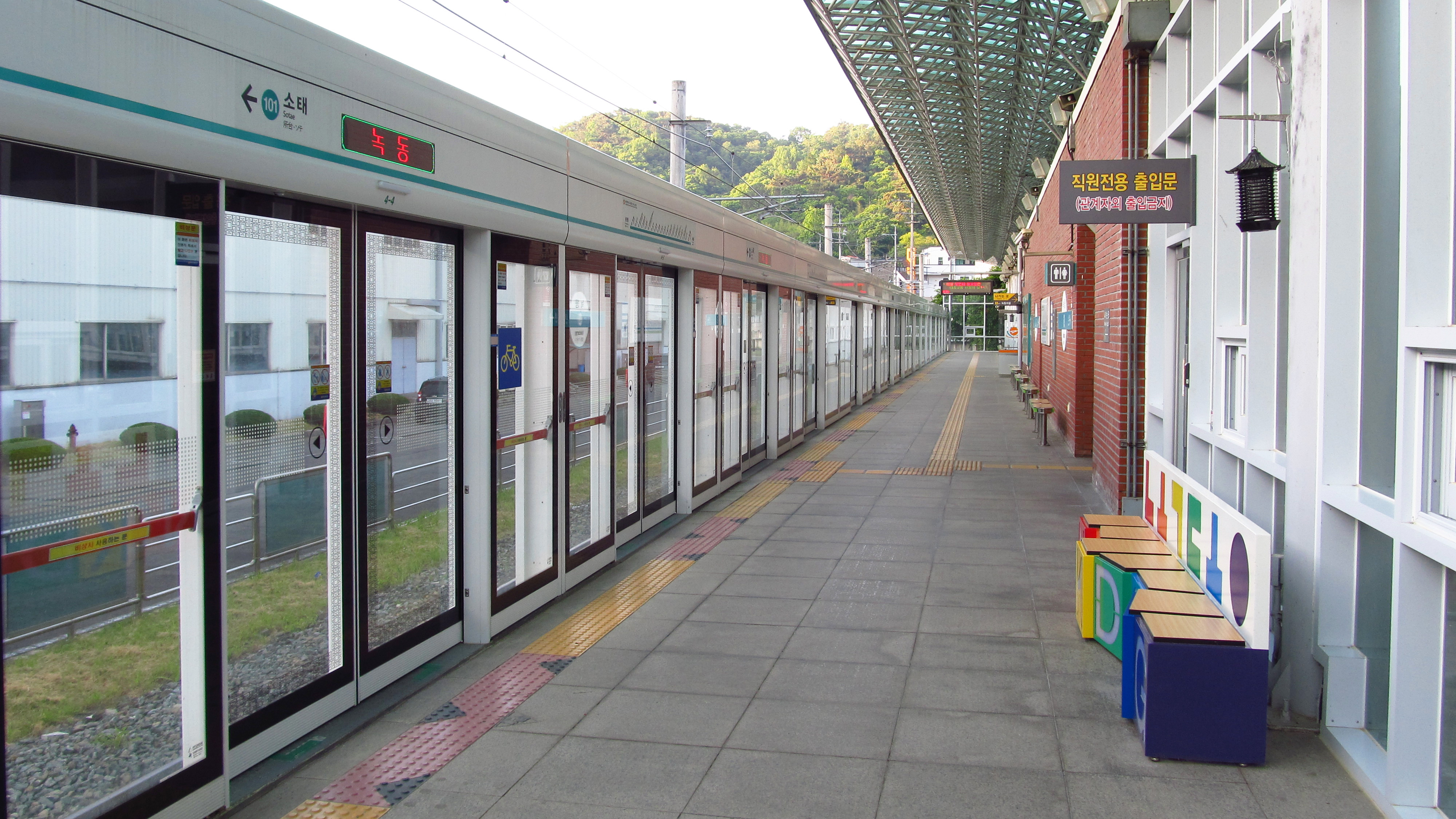

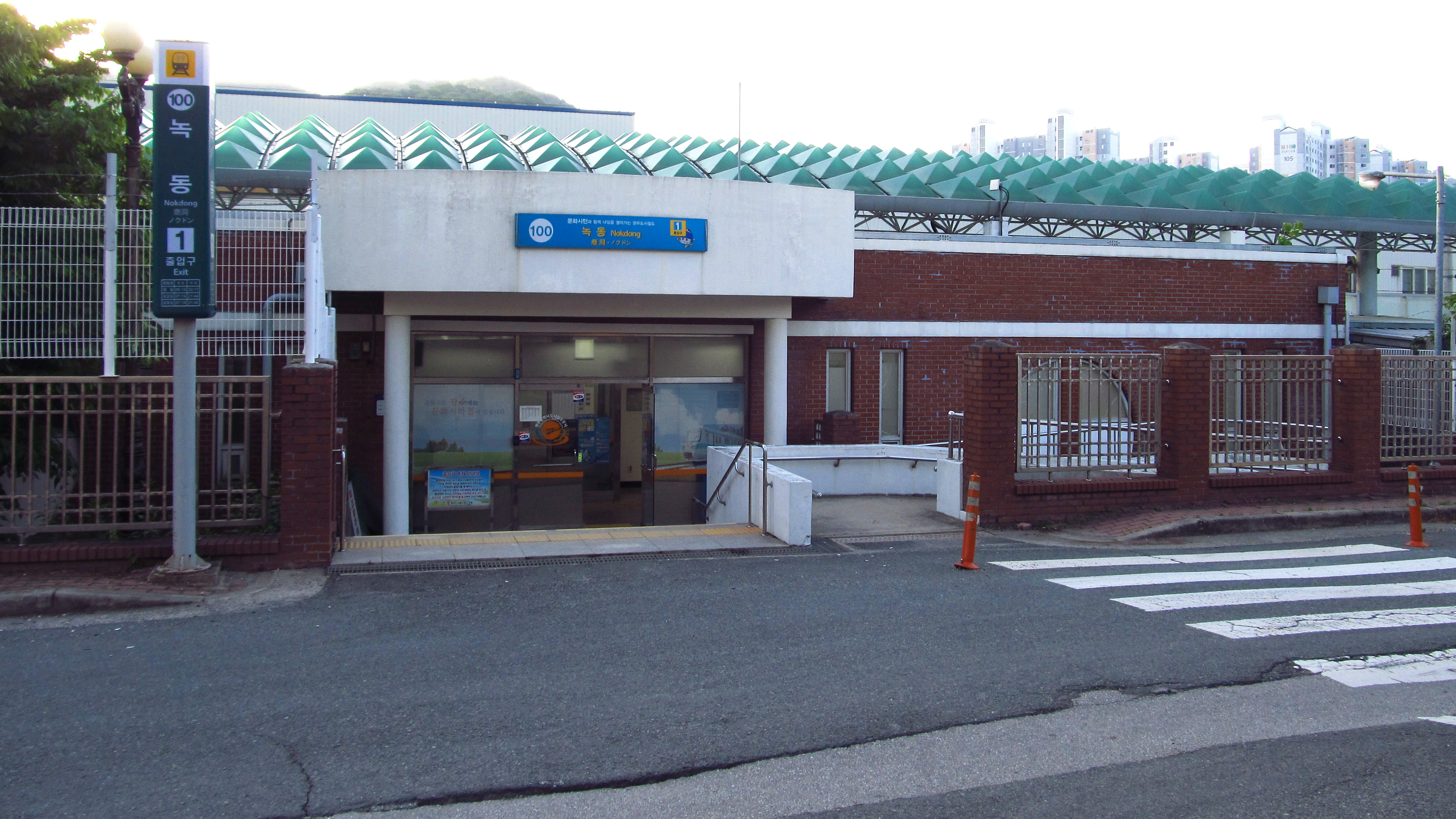
