= List of airport railway stations =

This is a list of railway stations with "airport" in the name.

== Africa ==
=== Algeria ===
- Algiers: Houari Boumediene Airport Railway Station

=== Morocco ===
- Casablanca: Mohammed V International Airport

=== South Africa ===
- Johannesburg: O. R. Tambo International Airport

== Asia ==
=== China ===
- Beijing: Daxing Jichang (Daxing Airport) station
- Changsha: Huanghua Airport
- Chengdu: Terminal 1 of Shuangliu International Airport station
- Chengdu: Terminal 2 of Shuangliu International Airport station
- Chengdu: Shuangliu Airport railway station
- Chengdu: Terminal 1 & 2 of Tianfu International Airport
- Chongqing: Terminal 2 of Jiangbei Airport station
- Chongqing: Terminal 3 of Jiangbei Airport station
- Dalian: Airport
- Guangzhou: Airport South station (Guangzhou Metro)
- Guangzhou: Airport North station (Guangzhou Metro)
- Guangzhou: Baiyun Airport North railway station
- Guiyang: Longdongbao International Airport
- Hangzhou: Xiaoshan International Airport station
- Hohhot: Bayan (Airport) station
- Hong Kong: Airport station (MTR)
- Jieyang: Jieyang Airport railway station
- Kunming: Airport Front
- Kunming: Kunming Airport
- Lanzhou: Zhongchuanjichang railway station (translated)
- Macau: Airport station (Macau Light Rapid Transit)
- Nanjing: Lukou International Airport station
- Ningbo: Lishe International Airport station
- Qingdao: Jiaodong International Airport
- Qingdao: Qingdao Airport railway station
- Sanya: Phoenix Airport railway station
- Shanghai: Hongqiao Airport Terminal 1 station
- Shanghai: Hongqiao Airport Terminal 2 station
- Shanghai: Pudong Airport Terminal 1&2 station
- Shenyang: Taoxianjichang (translated)
- Shenzhen: Airport station (Shenzhen Metro)
- Shenzhen: Shenzhen Airport railway station
- Shijiazhuang: Zhengding Airport railway station
- Tianjin: Binhaiguojijichang station (translated)
- Ürümqi: International Airport
- Ürümqi: International Airport North
- Wenzhou: Airport
- Wuhan: Tianhe Airport
- Wuhan: Tianhe International Airport station
- Wuxi: Shuofang Airport
- Xi'an: Airport West (T1, T2, T3)
- Xi'an: Airport (T5)
- Xuzhou: Guanyin Airport railway station
- Yinchuan: Hedong Airport railway station
- Zhengzhou: Xinzheng International Airport station
- Zhengzhou: Xinzheng Airport railway station

=== India ===
- Chennai: Chennai International Airport metro station
- Delhi: IGI Airport metro station
- Delhi: Terminal 1 IGI Airport metro station
- Lucknow: Chaudhary Charan Singh International Airport metro station
- Mumbai: Chhatrapati Shivaji Maharaj International Airport - T1 metro station
- Mumbai: Chhatrapati Shivaji Maharaj International Airport - T2 metro station
- Nagpur: Airport metro station (Nagpur)
- Nagpur: Airport South metro station (Nagpur)
- Nagpur: New Airport metro station

=== Japan ===
- Fukuoka: Fukuoka Airport Station
- Hanamaki: Hanamaki Airport Station
- Kobe: Kobe Airport Station
- Miyazaki: Miyazaki Airport Station
- Nagoya: Central Japan International Airport Station
- Naha: Naha Airport Station
- Osaka: Kansai Airport Station
- Osaka: Osaka Airport Station
- Sapporo: New Chitose Airport Station
- Sendai: Sendai Airport Station
- Tokyo: Haneda Airport Terminal 1 Station
- Tokyo: Haneda Airport Terminal 2 Station
- Tokyo: Haneda Airport Terminal 1·2 Station
- Tokyo: Haneda Airport Terminal 3 Station
- Tokyo: Narita Airport Terminal 1 Station
- Tokyo: Narita Airport Terminal 2·3 Station
- Yonago: Yonago Airport Station

=== Kazakhstan ===
- Astana: Airport (Astana LRT)

=== Qatar ===
- Doha: Hamad International Airport T1 station

=== Singapore ===
- Singapore: Changi Airport MRT station

=== South Korea ===
- Busan: Gimhae International Airport station
- Gwangju: Airport station (Gwangju)
- Seoul: Gimpo International Airport station
- Seoul: Incheon International Airport Terminal 1 station
- Seoul: Incheon International Airport Terminal 2 station

=== Taiwan ===
- Taipei: Songshan Airport metro station
- Taipei: Airport Terminal 1 metro station
- Taipei: Airport Terminal 2 metro station
- Kaohsiung: Kaohsiung International Airport metro station

=== Turkey ===
- İzmir: Adnan Menderes Airport railway station

=== United Arab Emirates ===
- Dubai: Airport Terminal 1 (Dubai Metro)
- Dubai: Airport Terminal 3 (Dubai Metro)

== Europe ==
=== Belgium ===
- Brussels: Brussels Airport-Zaventem railway station

=== Denmark ===
- Aalborg: Aalborg Airport railway station
- Copenhagen: Copenhagen Airport railway station
- Copenhagen: Lufthavnen station (translated)

=== Finland ===
- Helsinki: Helsinki Airport station

=== France ===
- Paris: Aéroport Charles de Gaulle 1 station (translated)
- Paris: Aéroport Charles de Gaulle 2 TGV station (translated)

=== Germany ===
- Berlin: BER Airport station
- Cologne: Cologne/Bonn Airport station
- Dresden: Dresden Flughafen station (translated)
- Düsseldorf: Düsseldorf Airport station
- Düsseldorf: Düsseldorf Airport Terminal station
- Frankfurt: Frankfurt Airport long-distance station
- Frankfurt: Frankfurt Airport regional station
- Hamburg: Hamburg Airport station
- Hanover: Hanover Airport station
- Leipzig: Leipzig/Halle Airport station
- Lübeck: Lübeck-Flughafen station (translated)
- Munich: Munich Airport Terminal station
- Stuttgart: Stuttgart Flughafen/Messe station (translated)

=== Greece ===
- Athens: Athens Airport station

=== Netherlands ===
- Amsterdam: Schiphol Airport station

=== Norway ===
- Bergen: Bergen Lufthavn (translated)
- Oslo: Oslo Airport Station
- Trondheim: Trondheim Airport Station

=== Portugal ===
- Lisbon: Aeroporto station (Lisbon Metro) (translated)
- Porto: Aeroporto station (Porto Metro) (translated)

=== Russia ===
- Moscow:

Aeroport (Moscow Metro) (translated) Aeroport Vnukovo (Moscow Metro)

=== Spain ===
- Barcelona: Aeroport T1 (Barcelona Metro) (translated)
- Barcelona: Aeroport T2 station (translated)
- Jerez de la Frontera: Estación de Aeropuerto de Jerez (translated)
- Madrid: Aeropuerto T1-T2-T3 (Madrid Metro) (translated)
- Madrid: Aeropuerto T4 (Madrid Metro) (translated)
- Málaga: Estación de Aeropuerto (Cercanías Málaga) (translated)
- Valencia: Aeroport (Metrovalencia) (translated)

=== Sweden ===
- Stockholm: Bromma Flygplats (translated)

=== Switzerland ===
- Geneva: Geneva Airport railway station
- Zurich: Zurich Airport railway station

=== United Kingdom ===
- Edinburgh: Edinburgh Airport
- Inverness: Inverness Airport railway station
- London: Gatwick Airport railway station
- London: London City Airport DLR station
- London: Luton Airport
- London: Luton Airport Parkway station
- London: Southend Airport railway station
- London: Stansted Airport railway station
- Manchester: Manchester Airport station
- Newcastle: Newcastle Airport Metro station
- Prestwick: Prestwick International Airport railway station
- Southampton: Southampton Airport Parkway railway station
- Teesside: Teesside Airport railway station

== North America ==
=== Canada ===
- Ottawa: Airport station (Ottawa)
- Vancouver: YVR–Airport station

=== Mexico ===
- Cancun: Cancún Airport railway station
- Tulum: Tulum Airport railway station

=== Panama ===
- Panama City: Aeropuerto metro station (translated)

=== United States ===
- Atlanta: Airport station (MARTA)
- Baltimore: BWI Airport station (Light RailLink)
- Boston: Airport station (MBTA)
- Cleveland: Airport station (GCRTA)
- Dallas: DFW Airport Terminal A station
- Dallas: DFW Airport Terminal B station
- Denver: Denver Airport station
- Oakland: Oakland International Airport station
- Philadelphia: Airport Terminal A
- Philadelphia: Airport Terminal B
- Philadelphia: Airport Terminals C & D
- Philadelphia: Airport Terminals E & F
- Portland: Portland Airport station
- Providence: T. F. Green Airport station
- Salt Lake City: Airport station (Utah Transit Authority)
- San Francisco: San Francisco International Airport station
- Seattle: SeaTac/Airport station
- St. Louis: Lambert Airport Terminal 1 station
- St. Louis: Lambert Airport Terminal 2 station
- Washington, D.C: Dulles International Airport station
- Washington, D.C: Ronald Reagan Washington National Airport station

== Oceania ==
=== Australia ===
- Brisbane: Domestic Airport railway station, Brisbane
- Brisbane: International Airport railway station, Brisbane
- Perth: Airport Central railway station
- Sydney: Airport Business Park metro station
- Sydney: Airport Terminal metro station
- Sydney: Domestic Airport railway station, Sydney
- Sydney: International Airport railway station, Sydney

== South America ==
=== Brazil ===
- São Paulo: Aeroporto–Guarulhos (CPTM) (translated)

== See also ==
- Airport station (disambiguation)
- International Airport station (disambiguation)
- Domestic Airport railway station (disambiguation)
- Airport rail link
- List of airport rail link systems
