= Terminal Station =

A terminal station is a train station at the end of the line.

Terminal Station may refer to:

- Birmingham Terminal Station, formerly in Birmingham, Alabama 1909–1969
- Ferry Terminal Station, in Suminoe-ku, Osaka, Japan
- Norfolk Terminal Station, formerly in Norfolk, Virginia 1912–1963
- Terminal Station (Atlanta), a former union station in downtown Atlanta, Georgia 1905–1970
- Terminal Station (Macon, Georgia), built in 1916 and located in the Macon Historic District
- Terminal Station (Hutchinson, Kansas), listed on the NRHP in Kansas
- Terminal Station (Chattanooga), listed on the NRHP in Tennessee
- Terminal station (Jacksonville), a former Jacksonville Skyway station later known as Convention Center station

Film

- Terminal Station (film), a 1953 film

== See also ==
- Termini Station (disambiguation)
- Domestic Terminal railway station (disambiguation)
- International Terminal railway station (disambiguation)
