= Ürümqi Metro =

Metro system of Ürümqi, Xinjiang, China

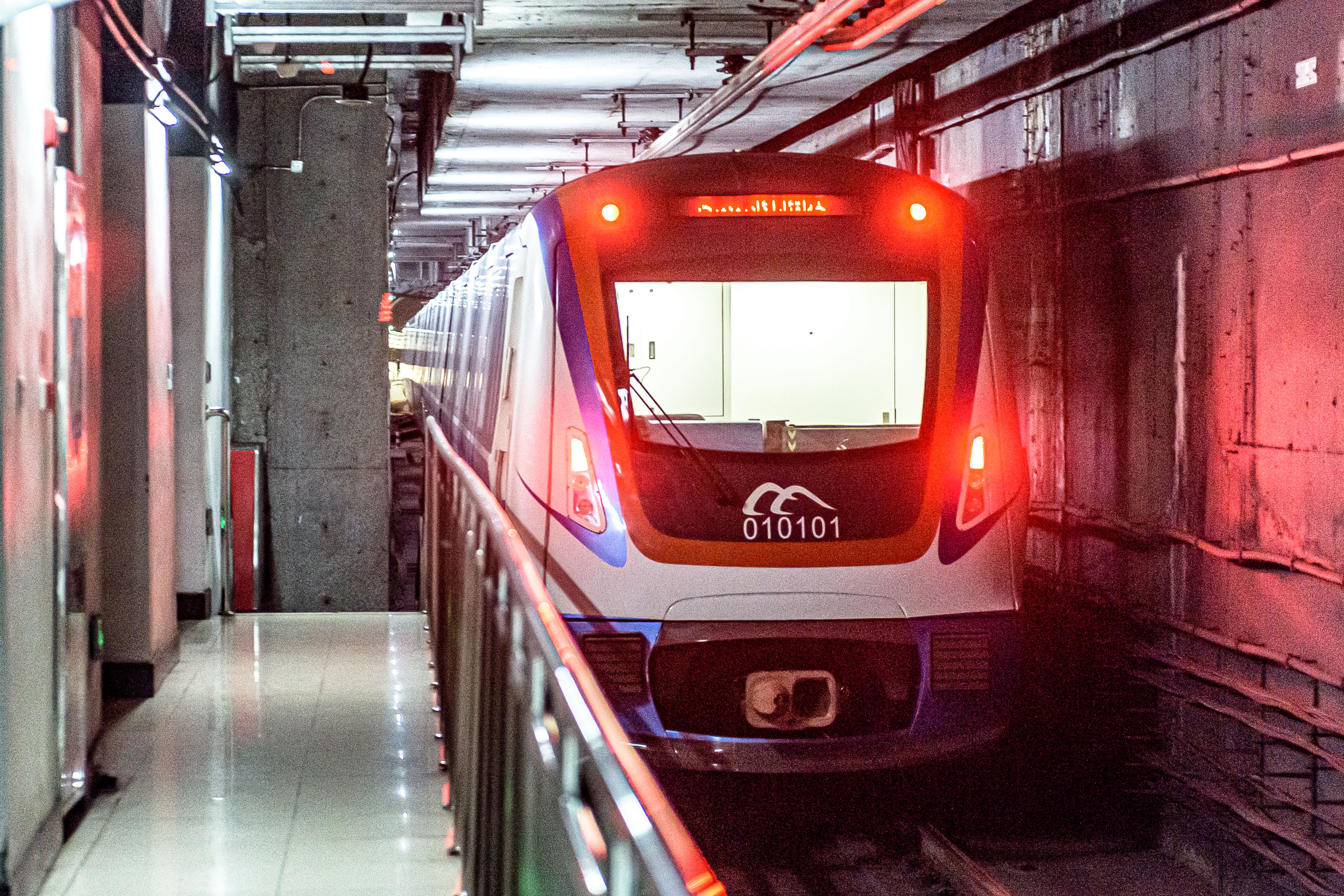
- A Line 1 train

Overview
- Locale: Ürümqi, Xinjiang, China
- Transit type: Rapid transit
- Number of lines: 3
- Number of stations: 31 (Note: Interchange stations are only counted once.)
- Daily ridership: 162,000 (29 April 2023 record)
- Annual ridership: 39,281,000 (2023)
- Website: http://www.urumqimtr.com/

Operation
- Began operation: October 25, 2018; 8 years ago
- Operator: Ürümqi Rail Transit Corporation
- Number of vehicles: 162 Revenue Railcars (July 2018)

Technical
- System length: 45.46 km (28.25 mi)
- Track gauge: 1,435 mm (4 ft 8 1/2 in) standard gauge
System map
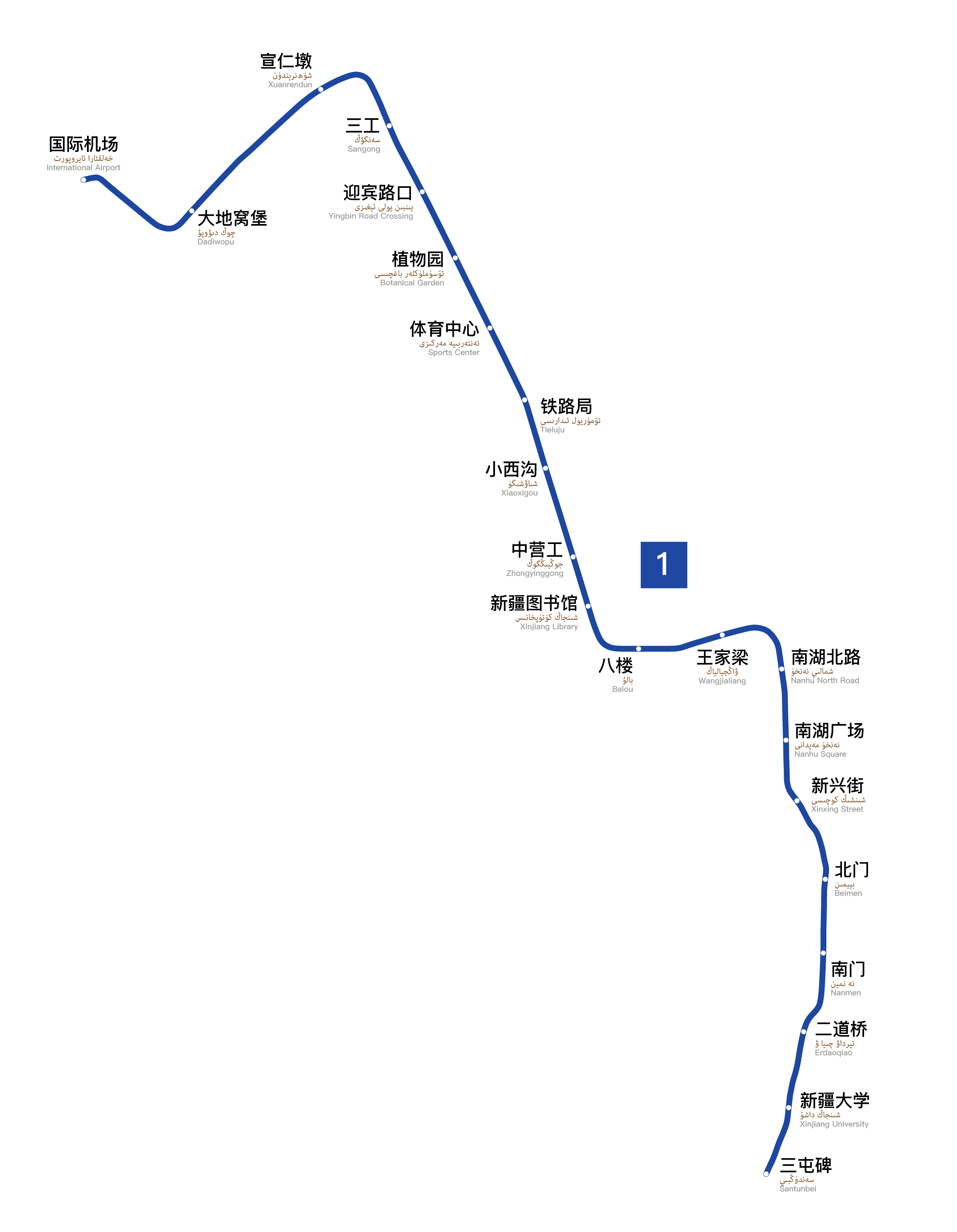

Ürümqi Metro

Chinese name
- Simplified Chinese: 乌鲁木齐地铁
- Traditional Chinese: 烏魯木齊地鐵
Transcriptions
Standard Mandarin
- Hanyu Pinyin: Wūlǔmùqí Dìtiě

Uyghur name
- Uyghur: ئۈرۈمچى مېتروسى
Transcriptions
- Latin Yëziqi: Ürümchi Mëtrosi
- Yengi Yeziⱪ: Ürümqi Metrosi
- SASM/GNC: Ürümqi Mêtrosi
- Siril Yëziqi: Үрүмчи Метроси

The Ürümqi Metro is a rapid transit system in operation in Ürümqi, capital of the Xinjiang Autonomous Region in China. It is the 35th rapid transit system to be put into operation in Mainland China and the second in northwest China. The system is 45.46 km (28.2 mi) in length.

== Lines ==
Line	Terminals		Operational	Last extension	Length km	Stations
1	International Airport (Xinshi)	Santunbei (Tianshan)	October 25, 2018	June 28, 2019	27.615	21
2	Huashan Street (Toutunhe)	Nanmen (Tianshan)	November 15, 2026	—	13.94	10
Airport MRT	International Airport (Xinshi)	North International Airport (Xinshi)	April 17, 2025	—	3.9	2

=== Line 1 ===
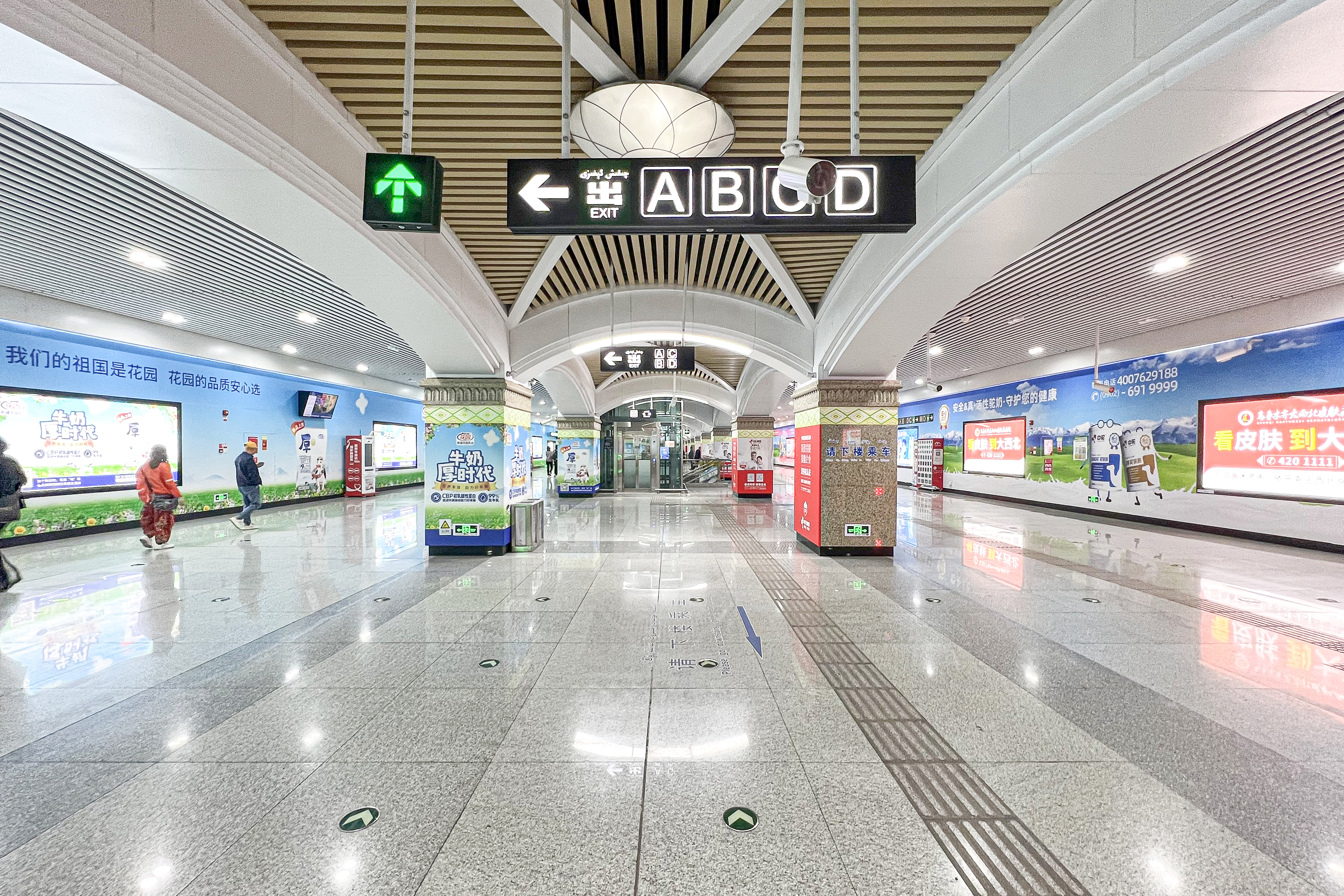
Concourse of Erdaoqiao Station

Line 1 runs from Ürümqi Tianshan International Airport through downtown Ürümqi and ends at Santunbei station. It has a total length of 27.615 km and 21 stations. It is fully underground.

Line 1 started construction on 20 March 2014. The northern section of the line opened on 25 October 2018. The southern section of the line opened on 28 June 2019.

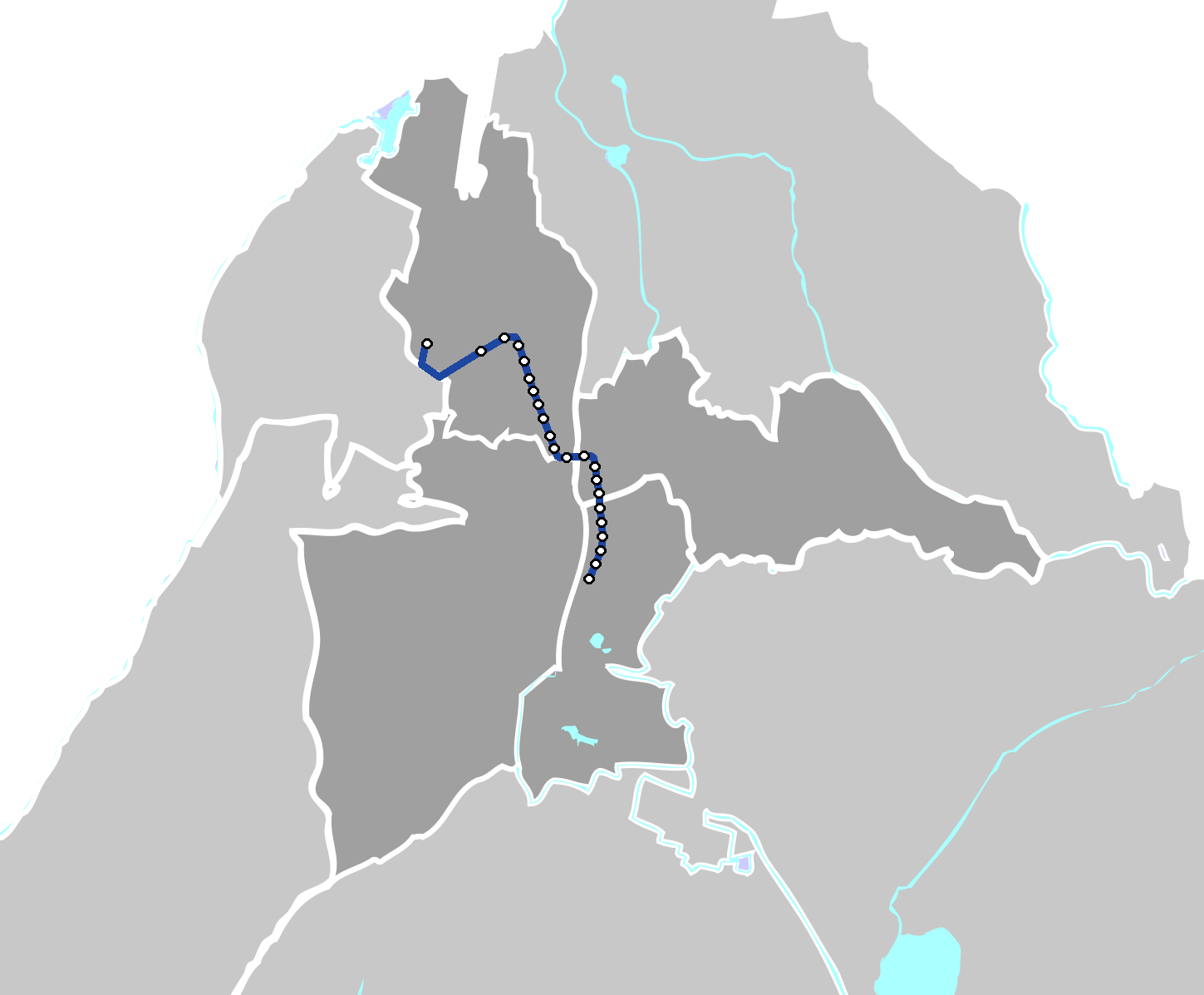

==== Airport MRT ====
The Airport MRT opened on 17 April 2025, and runs in Ürümqi Tianshan International Airport only. It consists of two stations, namely International Airport and North International Airport. This line is treated as a shuttle, connecting the closed southern terminal and the northern terminal. An extension is planned to East International Airport station. The station is complete but only for people working at the cargo terminal and is not open to the public.

Station name			Transfer
English	Chinese	Uyghur	Transfer
International Airport	国际机场	خەلقئارا ئايروپورت	1 URC (South) (Note: The South Terminal was closed on 17 April 2025 to make way for the new North Terminal.)
North International Airport	国际机场北	خەلقئارا ئايروپورت شىمال	URC (North)
East International Airport (Not in operation)	国际机场东	شەرق خەلقئارا ئايروپورت	

=== Line 2 ===
The Ürümqi Metro has submitted plans for two lines, Line 1 and Line 2, with an estimated cost of 31.24 billion yuan. Line 2 will have 16 stations from Yan'an Road to Huashan Street once both the northern section and southern section are completed. Line 2 serves Ürümqi railway station. The line is colored yellow on maps. Phase 1 (North section, 13.94 km with 10 stations) opened from Huashan Street to Nanmen on 15 November 2026. The list of operational stations:

- Nanmen (Line 1)
- Zhongqiao
- Nianzigou
- Nanliangpo
- Agricultural University
- Maliaodi
- Pingchuan Road
- Jiujiawan
- Urumqi Railway Station
- Huashan Street

Phase 2 of Line 2 is in early planning consideration. A 6.08 km section of Phase 2 opened on 17 April 2025 as the Airport MRT.

== Future Development ==
Lines 3, 4, 5, 6, 7 and 8 are under planning. Only Phase 1 of Line 3 and Phase 1 of Line 4 have been approved by NDRC.

Ürümqi Metro Map with planned expansions shown.

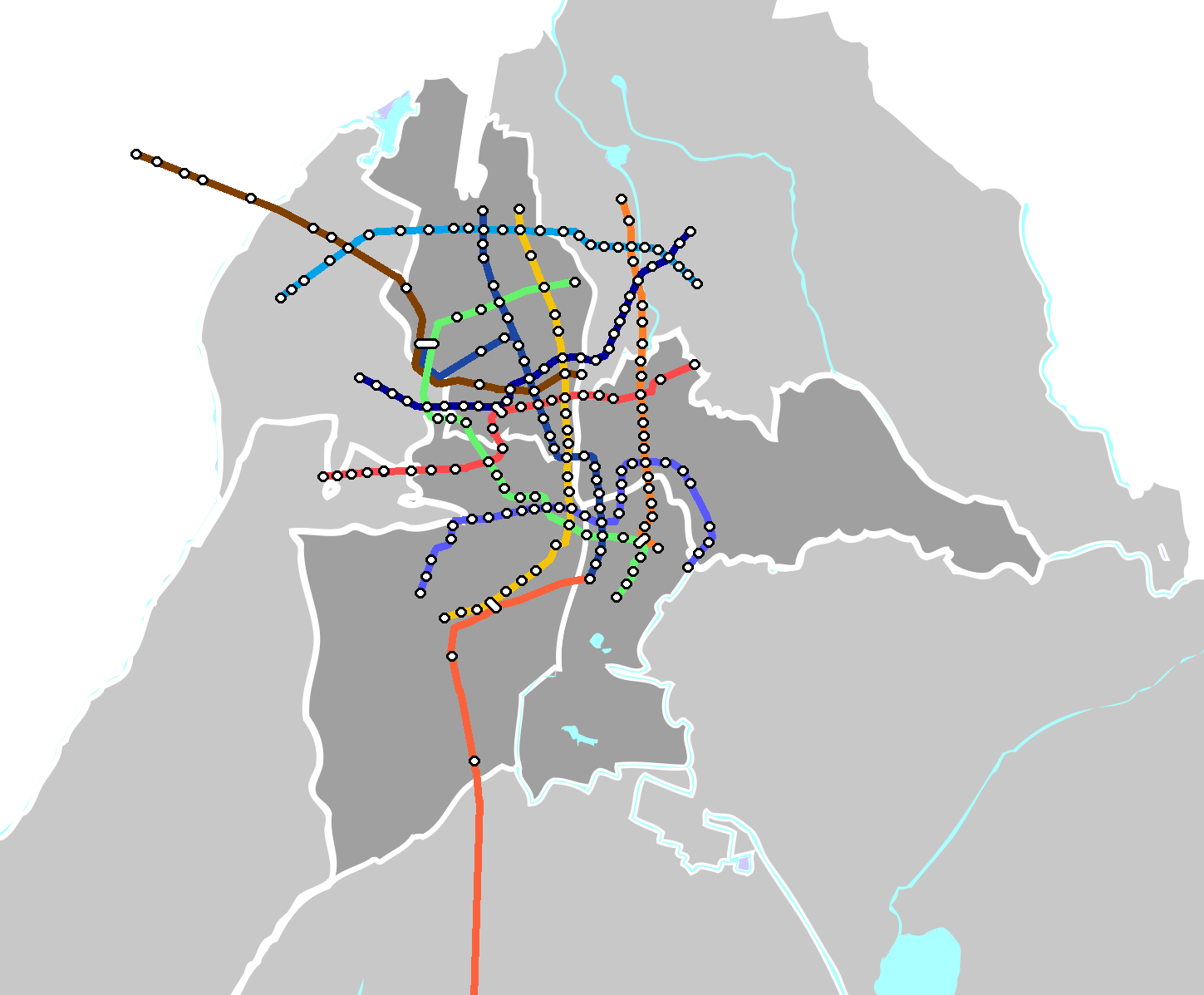
Long term planning map

== See also ==
- List of metro systems
- Urban rail transit in China

=== Other Transport in Ürümqi ===
- Ürümqi BRT, BRT system in Ürümqi
