= Line 2 (Ürümqi Metro) =

Metro line in Ürümqi, China

Overview
- Status: In operation (Northern section)
- Owner: Ürümqi Metro
- Locale: Ürümqi, Xinjiang, China
- Termini: Huashan Street; Nanmen
- Stations: 10

Service
- Type: Rapid transit
- System: Ürümqi Metro
- Operator(s): Ürümqi Metro, Xinjiang Wujing Railway Construction Rail Transit Co., Ltd
- Rolling stock: 6-car Type A

History
- Opened: 15 November 2026; 4 days ago

Technical
- Line length: 13.94 km (8.66 mi) (In operation); 19.5 km (12.1 mi) (Phase 1)
- Num of tracks: 2
- Track gauge: 1,435 mm (4 ft 8 1/2 in)
- Electrification: 1,500 V DC Overhead catenary
- Operating speed: 80 km/h (50 mph) (Maximum design speed); 36.2 km/h (22 mph) (Average speed)

Line 2 of Ürümqi Metro is a subway line serving Ürümqi, Xinjiang AR, China. The northern section commenced operation at 7:08 am on 15 November 2026. Xinjiang Wujing Railway Construction Rail Transit Co., Ltd is responsible for the investment, construction, and operation of Phase 1 of Line 2. Line 2 is operated under PPP project with a concession tenure of 35 years, including 5 years for construction and 30 years for operation and maintenance.

Phase 1 of Line 2 uses 12 six-car type A rolling stock for operation. In the long-term plan, a total of 20 trainsets will be purchased to meet the demands.

== History ==
On 11 November 2015, the groundbreaking ceremony for Phase 1 of Line 2 was commenced. Phase 1 spans 19.5 km (12.1 mi) with 16 underground stations. The total investment for Phase 1 is 16.29 billion RMB, with an average of 842 million RMB per kilometer.

On 1 September 2016, the first station began construction.

On 8 March 2026, the first 6-car Type A set was delivered from Baoding, Hebei to Ürümqi, setting a new record for the longest transport distance for a complete rolling stock delivery within Mainland China.

The northern section commenced operation at 7:08 am on 15 November 2026.

== Opening timeline ==
Segment	Commencement	Length	Station(s)	Name
Huashan Street - Nanmen	15 November 2026	13.94 km (8.66 mi)	10	Phase 1 northern section

== Headways and operating hours ==
During weekday rush hours, the headway is 6 minutes and 15 seconds. On weekends and holidays, the headway is 12 minutes for the entire day. The operating hours are from 7:40 am to 11:30 pm.

== Stations ==
The average distance between stations is 1.41 km (0.88 mi). While the largest distance is between Nanliangpo and Nianzigou stations at 2.135 km (1.327 mi), the smallest distance is 0.809 km (0.503 mi).

Station name			Transfer	Distance km	Location
English	Chinese	Uyghur	Transfer	Distance km	Location
Huashan Street	华山街	خۇاشەن كوچىسى			Toutunhe
Ürümqi Railway Station	乌鲁木齐站	ئۈرۈمچى پويىز ئىستانسىيىسى	4 WLQ		Toutunhe
Jiujiawan	九家湾	جيۇجياۋەن			Saybag
Pingchuan Road	平川路	پىڭچۈەن يولى			Saybag
Maliaodi	马料地	مالياۋدى			Saybag
Agricultural University	农业大学	يېزا ئىگىلىك داشۆسى			Saybag
Nanliangpo	南梁坡	نەنلياڭپو			Saybag
Nianzigou	碾子沟	نيەنزىگوۋ	3		Saybag
Zhongqiao	中桥	ئوتتۇرا كۆۋرۈك			Saybag
Nanmen	南门	نەنمېن	1		Tianshan

== Future expansions ==
Line 2 project starts from Yan'an Road station and ends at International Airport East station with a total length of 44.4 km (27.6 mi) and 26 stations. Phase 2 is being planned, with a total length of 25.1 km (15.6 mi) and 10 stations. In the future, the Airport MRT line will be merged to Line 2.
