= International Airport station =

International Airport station or International Terminal station can refer to transportation stations named as such or similarly. For a general list of stations located at airports, see list of airport stations.

International Airport station may refer to:

== Australia ==
- International Airport railway station, Sydney, also known as International Terminal
- International Airport railway station, Brisbane

== China ==
- International Airport station (Ürümqi Metro), a station on Line 1 (Ürümqi Metro)

== United Kingdom ==
- Birmingham International railway station

== United States ==
- BWI Airport station (Baltimore-Washington International Airport)
- BWI Airport station (Light RailLink)
- Dulles International Airport station (Washington Metro)
- Lelepaua station, Honolulu, also known as Daniel K. Inouye International Airport station
- Newark Liberty International Airport Station, New Jersey
- Oakland International Airport station (Bay Area Rapid Transit)
- Philadelphia International Airport stations (SEPTA)
- Portland International Airport station (TriMet)
- San Francisco International Airport station (Bay Area Rapid Transit)

== See also ==
- Airport station (disambiguation)
- International railway station (disambiguation)
- Domestic Airport railway station (disambiguation)
