= Domestic Terminal railway station =

Domestic Terminal railway station or Domestic Airport railway station can refer to:

- Domestic Airport railway station, Sydney, New South Wales, Australia (also known as Domestic Terminal)
- Domestic Airport railway station, Brisbane, Queensland, Australia

== See also ==
- International Airport station (disambiguation)
- Airport station (disambiguation)
- List of airport stations
