= International railway station =

International railway station can refer to:

== Spain ==
- Canfranc International railway station

== United Kingdom ==
- Ashford International railway station
- Birmingham International railway station
- Ebbsfleet International railway station
- Harwich International railway station
- St Pancras railway station (St Pancras International)
- Stratford International station
- Waterloo International railway station

== United States ==
- BWI Business District station

== See also ==
- International Airport railway station (disambiguation)
