= Airport station =

Airport station may refer to:

== General use ==
- List of airport stations

== Particular stations ==
- Airport station (Dalian Metro), at Dalian Zhoushuizi International Airport in China
- Airport station (Fuzhou Metro), at Fuzhou Changle International Airport in China
- Airport station (GCRTA), at Cleveland Hopkins International Airport in Cleveland, Ohio, United States
- Airport station (Gwangju), at Gwangju Airport in South Korea
- Airport station (Macau Light Rapid Transit), at Macau International Airport in Macau
- Airport station (MARTA), at Hartsfield–Jackson Atlanta International Airport in Atlanta, Georgia, United States
- Airport station (MBTA), near Logan International Airport in Boston, Massachusetts, United States
- Airport station (MTR), at Hong Kong International Airport in Hong Kong
- Airport station (Ottawa), at Ottawa Macdonald–Cartier International Airport in Canada
- Airport station (Shenzhen Metro), at Shenzhen Bao'an International Airport in China
- Airport station (TransLink) (closed), near Vancouver International Airport in Canada
- Airport station (Utah Transit Authority), at Salt Lake City International Airport in Salt Lake City, Utah, United States
- Airport station (Wenzhou Rail Transit), at Wenzhou Longwan International Airport in China

== See also ==
- Aeroporto station (disambiguation)
