= Macau Refuse Incineration Plant =

Incinerator in Taipa, Macau, China

Macau Refuse Incineration Plant 澳門垃圾焚化中心 Incineração de Resíduos Sólidos de Macau
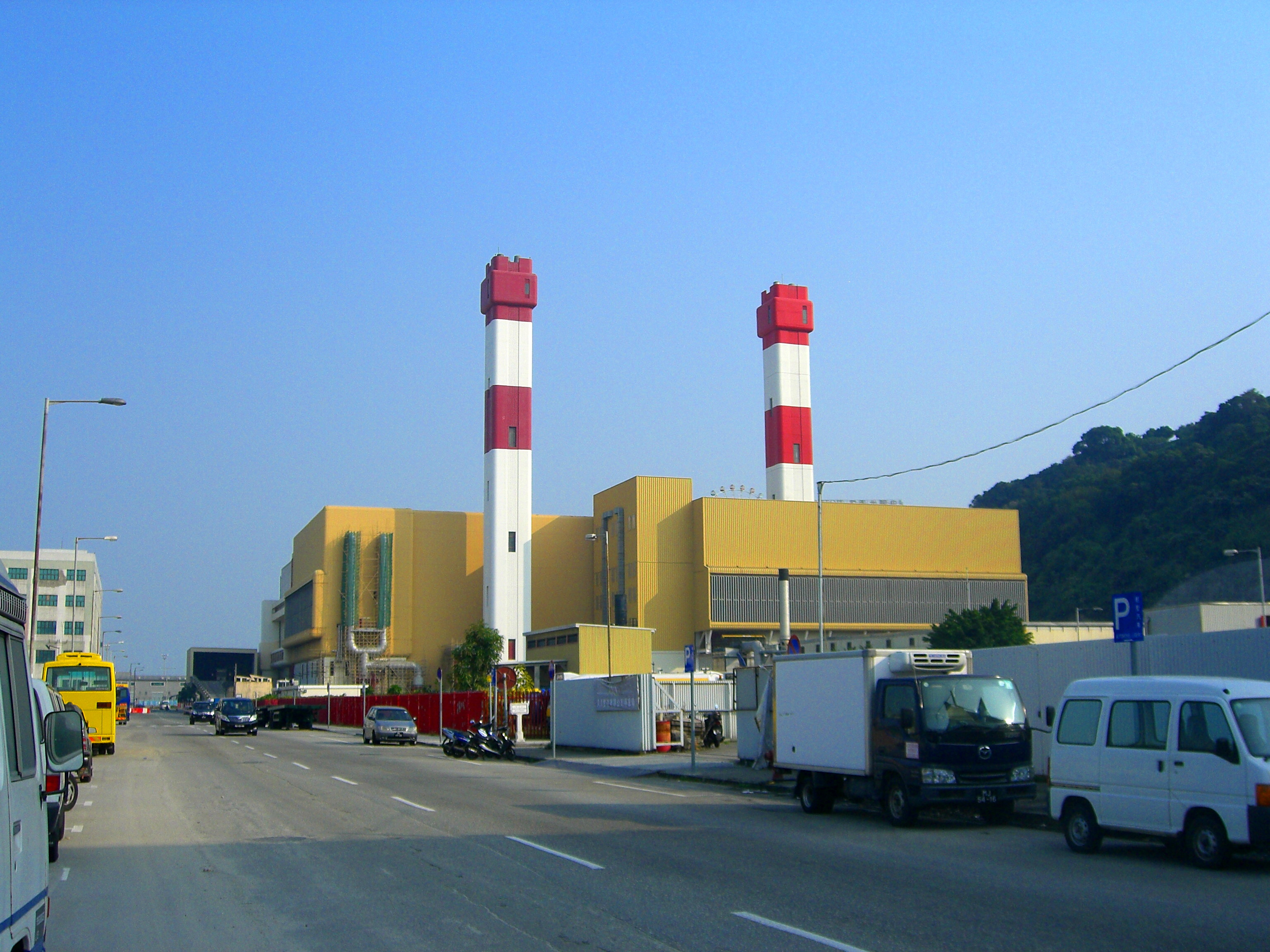
- Operated: 1992
- Location: Taipa, Macau, China
- Coordinates: 22°9′39.5″N 113°34′21.2″E
- Style: incinerator
- Area: 4.5 ha (11 acres)

Macau Refuse Incineration Plant
- Traditional Chinese: 澳門垃圾焚化中心
- Simplified Chinese: 澳门垃圾焚化中心
Transcriptions
Yue: Cantonese
- Jyutping: ou3 mun4 laap6 saap3 fan4 faa3 zung1 sam1

The Macau Refuse Incineration Plant (MRIP; Chinese: 澳門垃圾焚化中心; Portuguese: Incineração de Resíduos Sólidos de Macau) is an incinerator in Taipa, Macau.

== History ==
The plant was commissioned in 1992. In 2009, the waste processing capacity of the plant was doubled.

== Architecture ==
The plant spans over an area of 4.5 hectares.

== Technical details ==
The plant has a waste processing facility of 1,728 tons per day being done by its six incinerators, with the current capacity of 1,400 tons/day.

== See also ==
- Air pollution in Macau
