= Line 1 (Ürümqi Metro) =

Metro line in Ürümqi, China

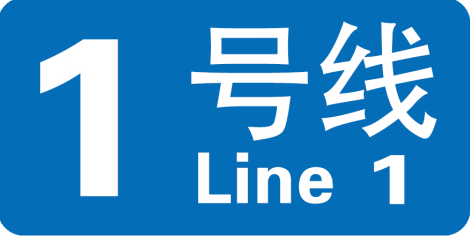

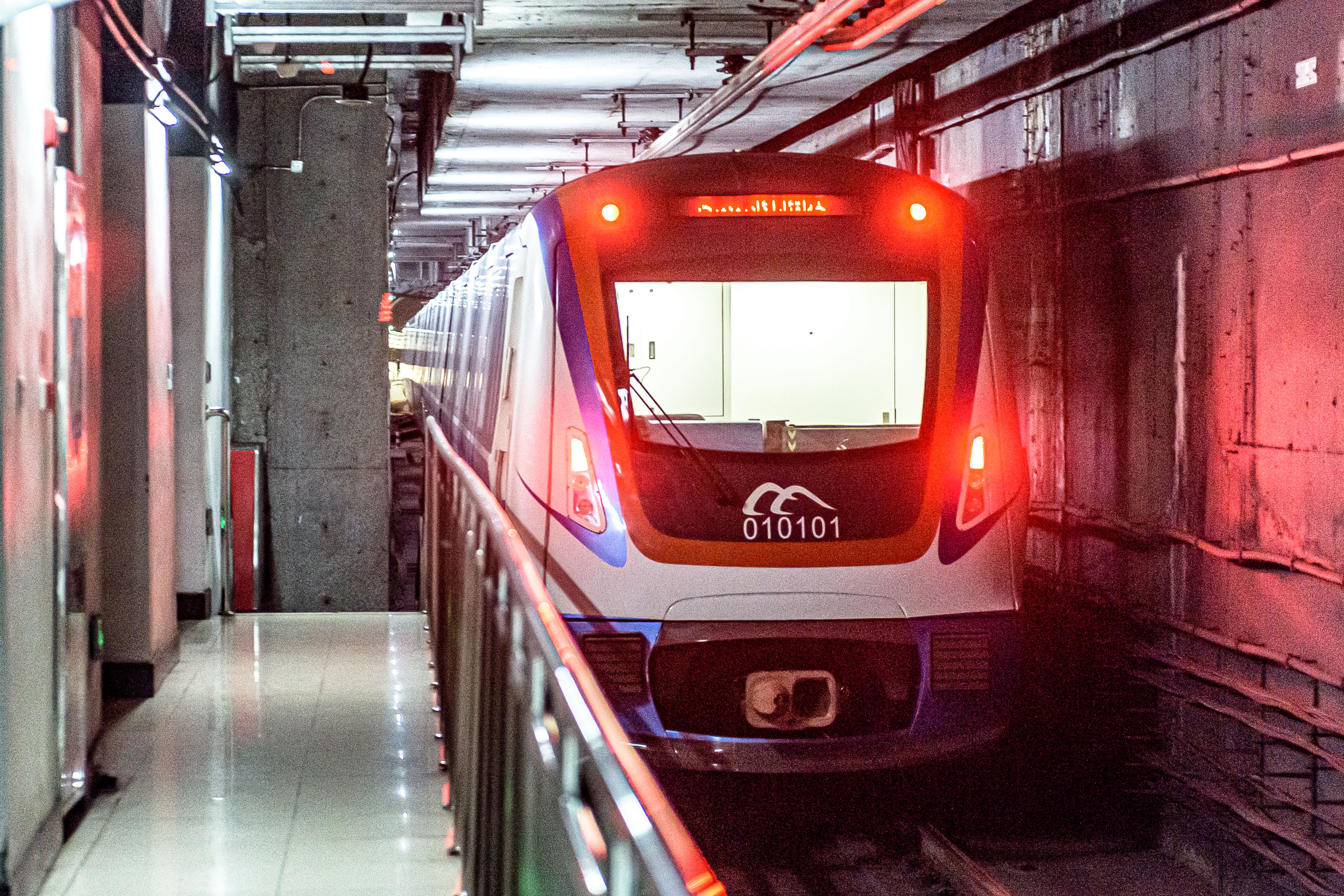
- Line 1 train leaving Balou station

Overview
- Status: Operational
- Locale: Ürümqi, Xinjiang, China
- Termini: International Airport; Santunbei
- Stations: 21

Service
- Type: Rapid transit
- System: Ürümqi Metro
- Operator: Ürümqi Metro Group Corporation Ltd
- Rolling stock: 6-car Type A

History
- Opened: 25 October 2018; 8 years ago

Technical
- Line length: 27.615 km (17.159 mi)
- Num of tracks: 2
- Character: Underground
- Track gauge: 1,435 mm (4 ft 8 1/2 in)
- Operating speed: 80 km/h
Route map
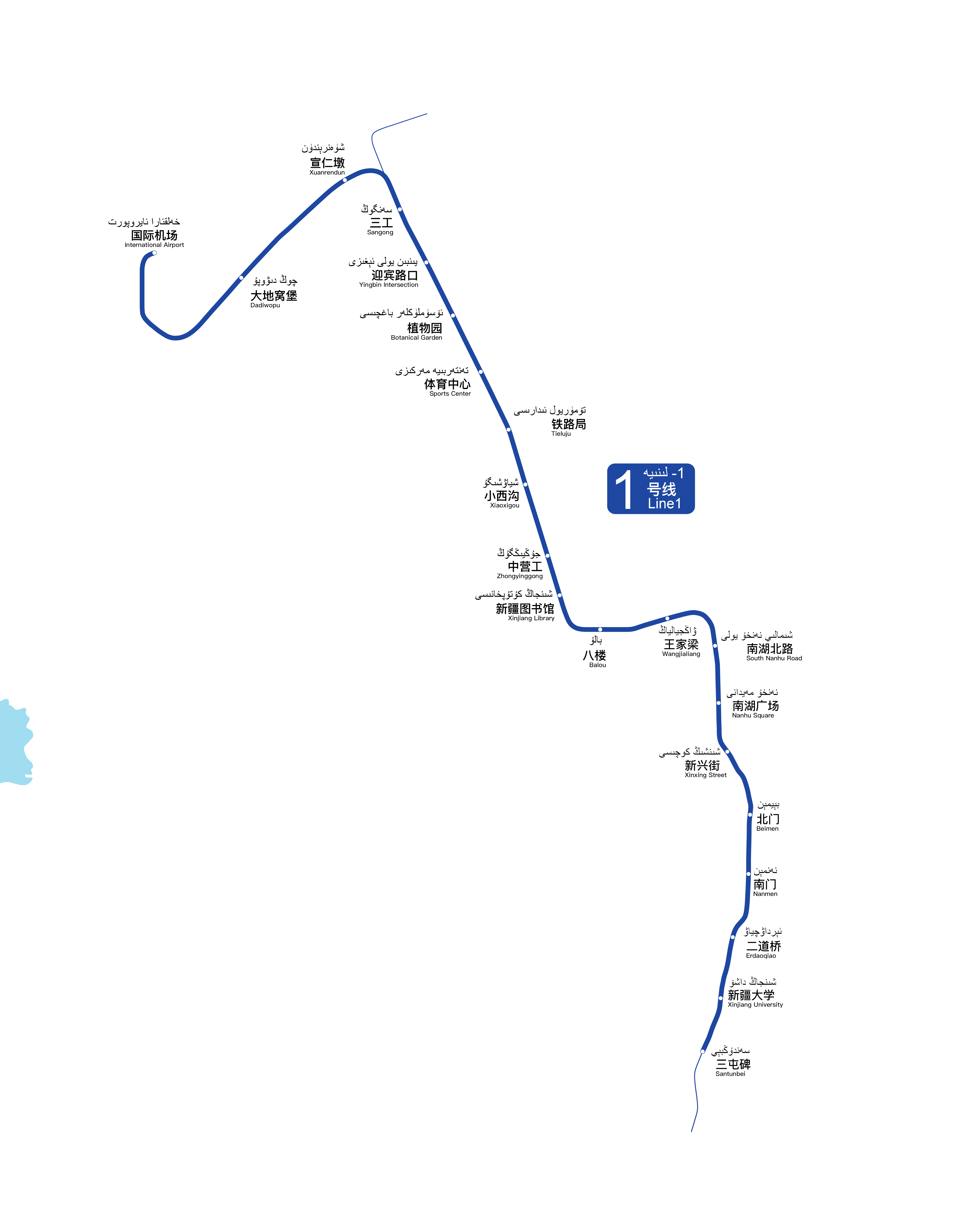

Line 1

Chinese name
- Simplified Chinese: 乌鲁木齐地铁1号线
- Traditional Chinese: 烏魯木齊地鐵1號線
Transcriptions
Standard Mandarin
- Hanyu Pinyin: Wūlǔmùqí Dìtiě Yī Hào Xiàn

Uyghur name
- Uyghur: ئۈرۈمچى مېتروسى; 1- لىنىيە
Transcriptions
- Latin Yëziqi: Ürümchi Mëtrosi Linie Bir
- Yengi Yeziⱪ: Ürümqi Metrosi Liniə Bir
- SASM/GNC: Ürümqi Mêtrosi Liniä Bir
- Siril Yëziqi: Үрүмчи Метроси Линиə Бир

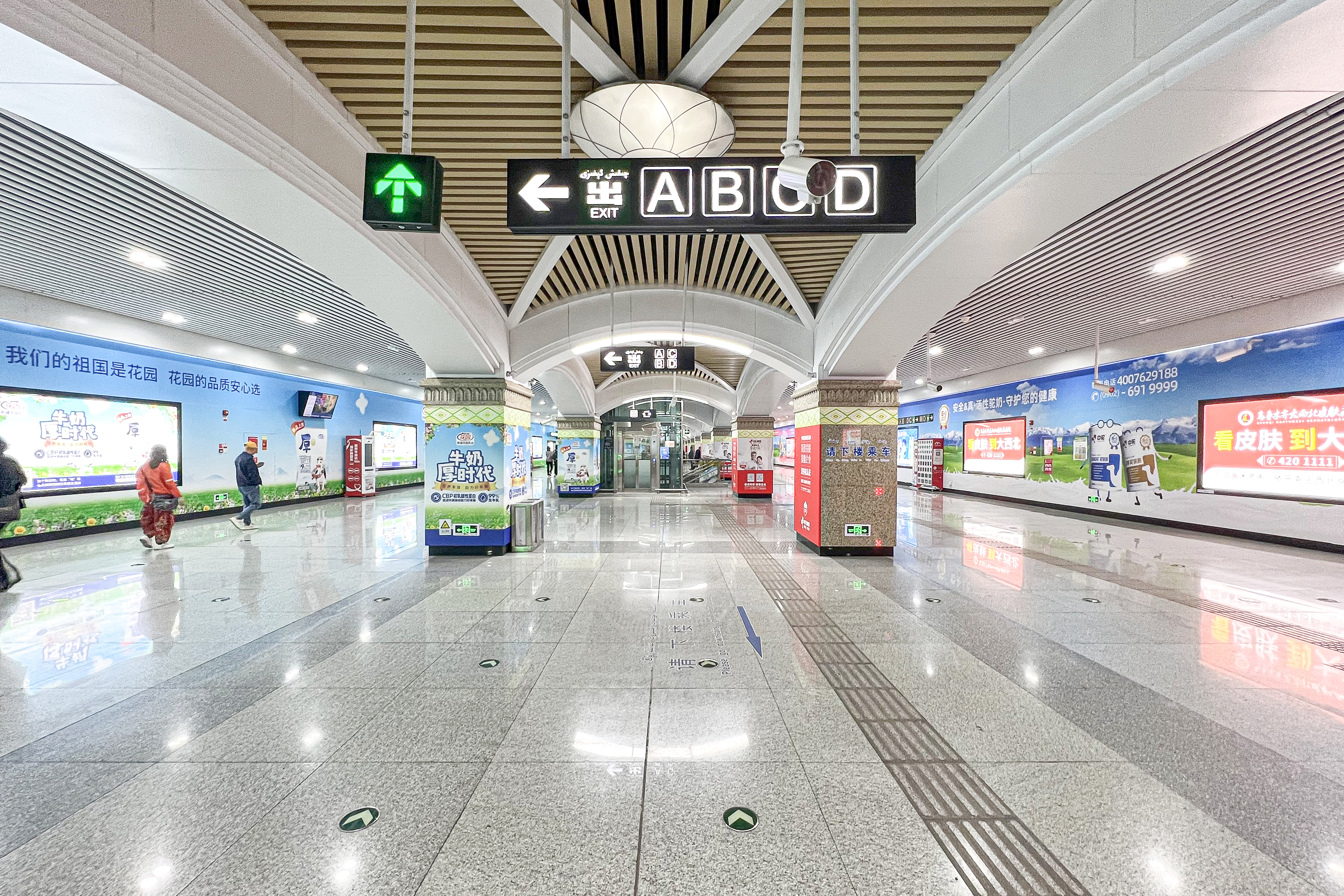
Concourse of Erdaoqiao Station

Line 1 of the Ürümqi Metro is a rapid transit line in Ürümqi, Xinjiang, China. The northern section from International Airport to Balou opened on 25 October 2018. The southern section from Balou to Santunbei opened on 28 June 2019.

Line 1 had a total length of 27.615 km and 21 stations. It is fully underground.

== History ==
Line 1 commenced construction in March 2014. Tunneling works were completed in December 2017. The northern section (16.5 km) opened on 25 October 2018. The southern section (11.1 km) opened on 28 June 2019.

=== Opening timeline ===
Segment	Commencement	Length	Station(s)	Name
International Airport — Balou	25 October 2018	16.5 km (10.3 mi)	12	Phase 1 (northern section)
Balou — Santunbei	28 June 2019	11.1 km (6.9 mi)	9	Phase 1 (southern section)

== Stations ==
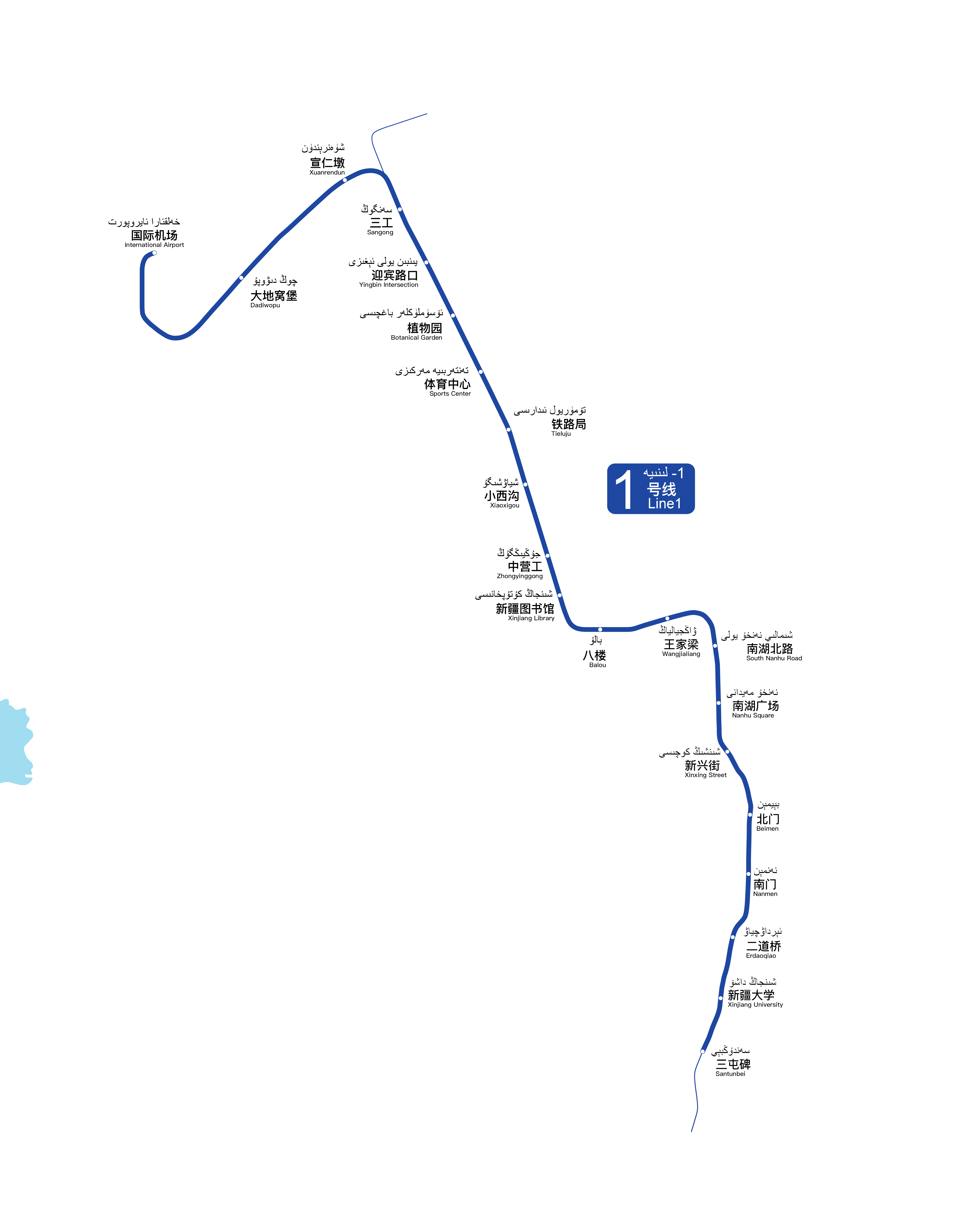

Station name			Transfer	Distance km		Location
English	Chinese	Uyghur	Transfer	Distance km		Location
Santunbei	三屯碑	سەندۈڭبىي		0.00	0.00	Tianshan
Xinjiang University	新疆大学	شىنجاڭ داشۆ		0.66	0.66	Tianshan
Erdaoqiao	二道桥	ئيرداۋ چىيا ۋ		1.24	1.90	Tianshan
Nanmen	南门	نە نمين	2	1.49	3.39	Tianshan
Beimen	北门	بېيمىن		0.95	4.34	Tianshan
Xinxing Street	新兴街	شىنشىڭ كوچىسى		1.29	5.63	Shuimogou
Nanhu Square	南湖广场	نەنخۈ مەيدانى		1.09	6.72	Shuimogou
Nanhu North Road	南湖北路	شمالىي نەنخۈ		1.27	7.99	Shuimogou
Wangjialiang	王家梁	ۋاڭجيالياڭ		1.15	9.14	Shuimogou
Balou	八楼	بالۇ		1.55	10.69	Saybag/Xinshi
Xinjiang Library	新疆图书馆	شىنجاڭ كۈتۈپخانىس		1.08	11.77	Xinshi
Zhongyinggong	中营工	جوڭيىڭگوڭ		0.90	12.67	Xinshi
Xiaoxigou	小西沟	شىاۋشىگۈ		1.49	14.16	Xinshi
Tieluju	铁路局	تۆمۈريول ئىدارىسى		1.22	15.38	Xinshi
Sports Center	体育中心	تەنتەربىيە مەركىزى		1.23	16.61	Xinshi
Botanical Garden	植物园	ئۆسۈملۈكلەر باغچىسى		1.18	17.79	Xinshi
Yingbin Road Crossing	迎宾路口	مەرھابا يولى ئېغىزى		1.24	19.03	Xinshi
Sangong	三工	سەنگۇڭ		1.35	20.38	Xinshi
Xuanrendun	宣仁墩	شۈەنرېندۈن		1.21	21.59	Xinshi
Dadiwopu	大地窝堡	چوڭ دىئوپو		2.70	24.29	Xinshi
International Airport	国际机场	خەلقئارا ئايروپورت	Airport MRT URC	2.96	27.25	Xinshi
