= Songjeong Park station =

Metro station in Gwangju, South Korea

116 송정공원 Songjeong Park
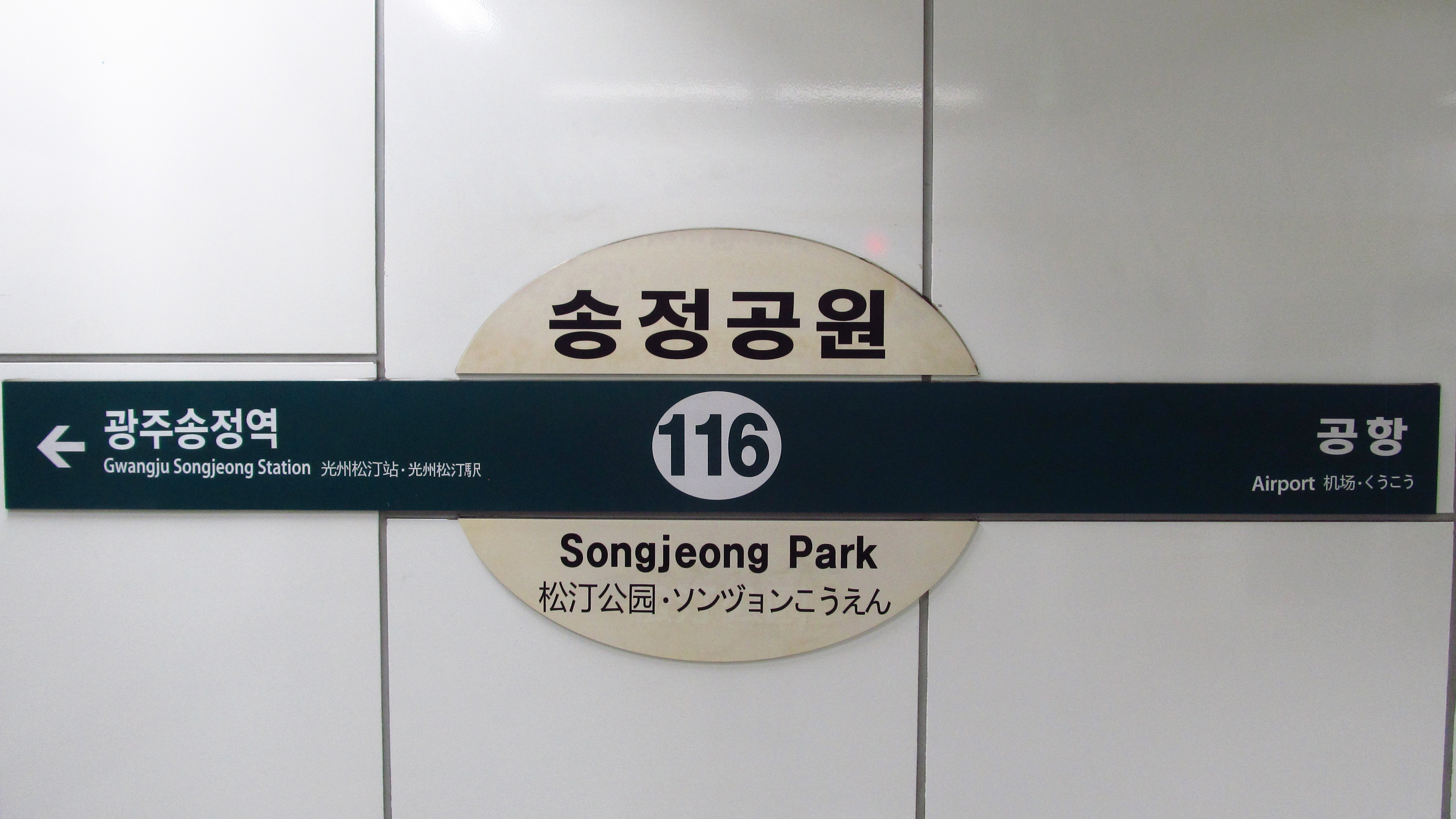

Korean name
- Hangul: 송정공원역
- Hanja: 松汀公園驛
- Revised Romanization: Songjeong gongwon yeok
- McCune–Reischauer: Songjŏng kongwŏn yŏk

General information
- Location: Songjeong-dong, Gwangsan District, Gwangju; South Korea
- Coordinates: 35°8′36.67″N 126°47′56.7″E
- Operator: Gwangju Metropolitan Rapid Transit Corporation
- Line: Line 1
- Platforms: 2
- Tracks: 2

Construction
- Structure type: Underground

Other information
- Station code: 116

History
- Opened: April 11, 2008

Services
Preceding station	Gwangju Metro	Following station
Airport towards Nokdong	Line 1	Gwangju Songjeong Station towards Pyeongdong
Location

Songjeong Park station (Korean: 송정공원역; Hanja: 松汀公園驛) is a station of Gwangju Metro Line 1 in Songjeong-dong, Gwangsan District, Gwangju, South Korea. It serves as a transit station using local buses for citizens living in residential areas such as Hanam, Unnam, and Suwan. There is a subway literature museum at this station.

== Station layout ==
G	Street Level	Exits
L1	Concourse	Faregates, Ticketing Machines, Station Control
L2; Platforms	Side platform, doors will open on the right
L2; Platforms	Southbound	← Line 1 toward Nokdong (Airport)
L2; Platforms	Northbound	→ Line 1 toward Pyeongdong (Gwangju Songjeong Station) →
L2; Platforms	Side platform, doors will open on the right
