= Hainan Highway 1 =

Proposed highway in Hainan Province, China

Hainan Coastal Scenic Highway

Route information
- Length: 988 km (614 mi)

Location
- Country: China

Highway system
- Transport in China

Hainan Highway 1, also known as Hainan Coastal Scenic Highway, officially as "National Coast No. 1 Scenic Route" is a dual-lane coastal highway loop in Hainan, China that was completed on 18 December 2023.
