= MUST station =

Macau Light Rapid Transit station

UCTM 科大
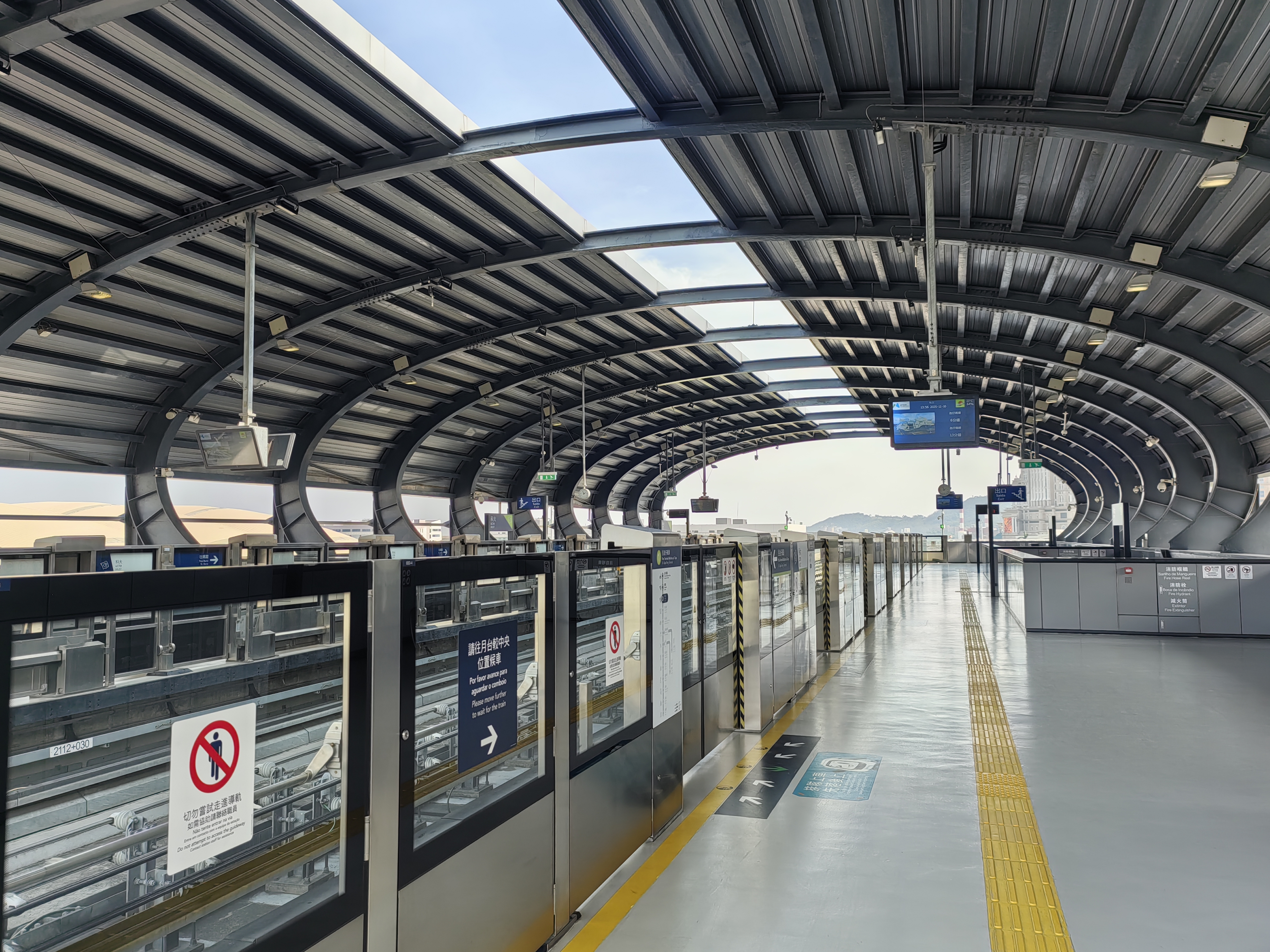
- Platform 1 of MUST station, November 2025

General information
- Location: Avenida do Aeroporto; Freguesia de Nossa Senhora do Carmo; Macau
- Coordinates: 22.152997°N 113.570647°E
- Operated by: MTR (Macau)
- Line: Taipa
- Platforms: 2 side platforms

Construction
- Structure type: Elevated

Other information
- Station code: ST21

History
- Opened: 10 December 2019

Services
Preceding station	Macau Light Rapid Transit	Following station
Cotai East towards Barra	Taipa line	Airport towards Taipa Ferry Terminal
Route map
Location

MUST station (Chinese: 科大站; Portuguese: Estação da UCTM) is a station on Taipa line of the Macau Light Rapid Transit, named after Macau University of Science and Technology.

== History ==
In the original plan this station is named University of Science and Technology station (Chinese: 科技大學站; Portuguese: Estação Universidade de Ciência e Tecnologia), but later adopted the abbreviation as the station name. Building work of this and three other stations in Cotai began in 2012. Although completed in 2016, the opening of the station was delayed due to ongoing work at Taipa line train depot.

The station opened on 10 December 2019 along with the Taipa line.

== Station layout ==
Two side platforms are on the second floor, and ticket hall is located on the first floor.

- Exit A: Macau University of Science and Technology, International School of Macao, Wynn Palace
- Exit B: Custom of airport (for goods), Macau Light Rapid Transit Depot
