= Cotai East station =

Macau Light Rapid Transit station

Cotai Leste 路氹東
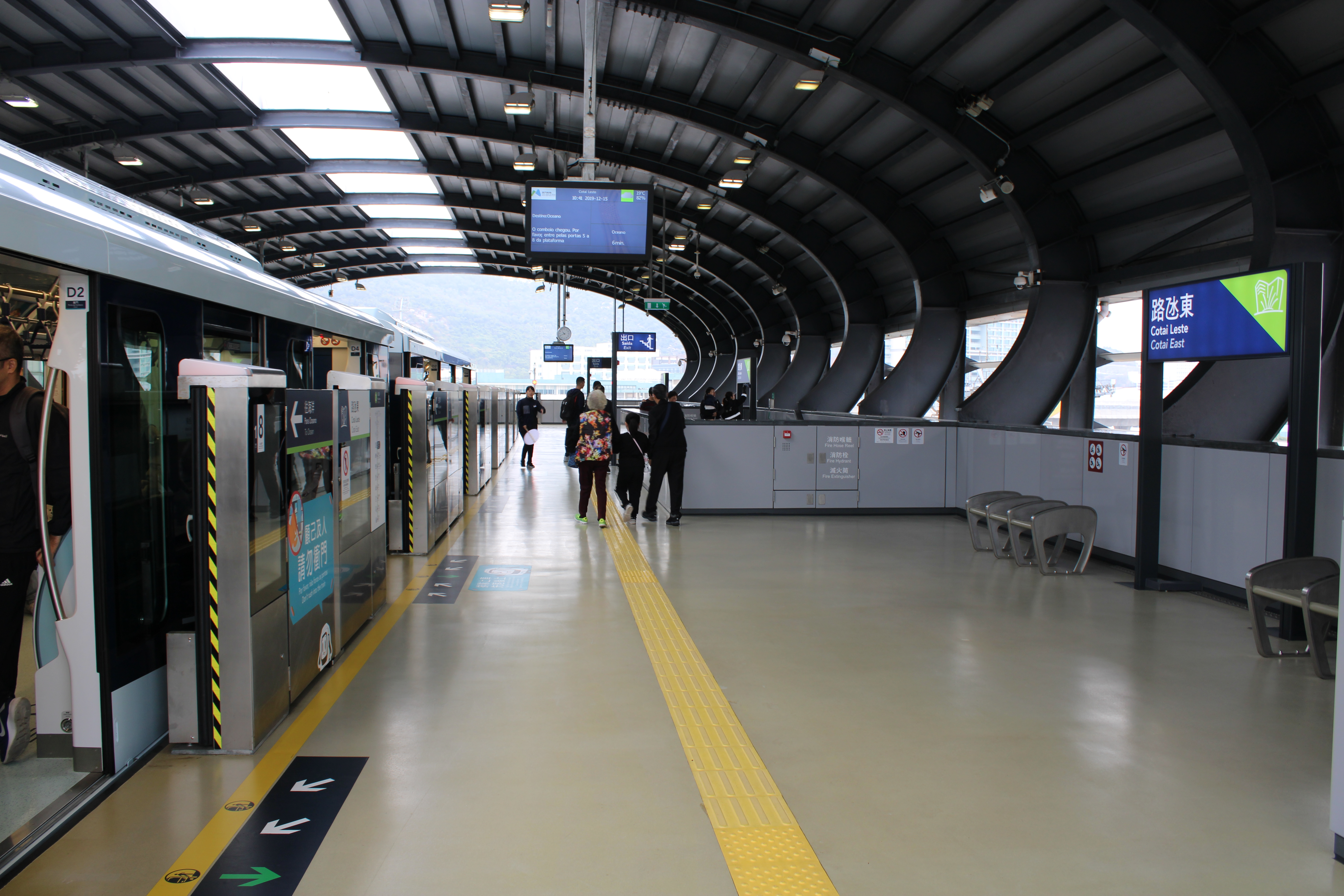
- Platform 2 of Cotai East station, December 2019

General information
- Location: Avenida da Nave Desportiva; Cotai; Macau
- Coordinates: 22.148231°N 113.569136°E
- Operated by: MTR (Macau)
- Line(s): Taipa
- Platforms: 2 side platforms

Construction
- Structure type: Elevated

Other information
- Station code: ST20

History
- Opened: 10 December 2019

Services
Preceding station	Macau Light Rapid Transit	Following station
East Asian Games towards Barra	Taipa line	MUST towards Taipa Ferry Terminal
Route map
Location

Cotai East station (Chinese: 路氹東站; Portuguese: Estação Cotai Leste) is a station on Taipa line of the Macau Light Rapid Transit, mainly serving tourists and staff due to its proximity to multiple casino resorts including Wynn Palace, Londoner Macao, and City of Dreams.

== History ==
In the original plan this station is named East Zone of Cotai station (路氹城東站; Estação Zona Este do Cotai). Building work of this and three other stations in Cotai began in 2012. Although completed in 2016, the opening of the station was delayed due to ongoing work at Taipa line train depot.

The station opened on 10 December 2019 along with the Taipa line. The bridge linking Grand Hyatt Macau and Wynn Palace opened in advance in May 2019.

== Station layout ==
Two side platforms are on the second floor, and ticket hall is located on the first floor.

- Exit A: City of Dreams, Grand Hyatt Macau, Morpheus, Londoner Macao, MGM Cotai
- Exit B: International School of Macao, Wynn Palace
