= Line 6 (Kunming Metro) =

Metro line in Kunming, China

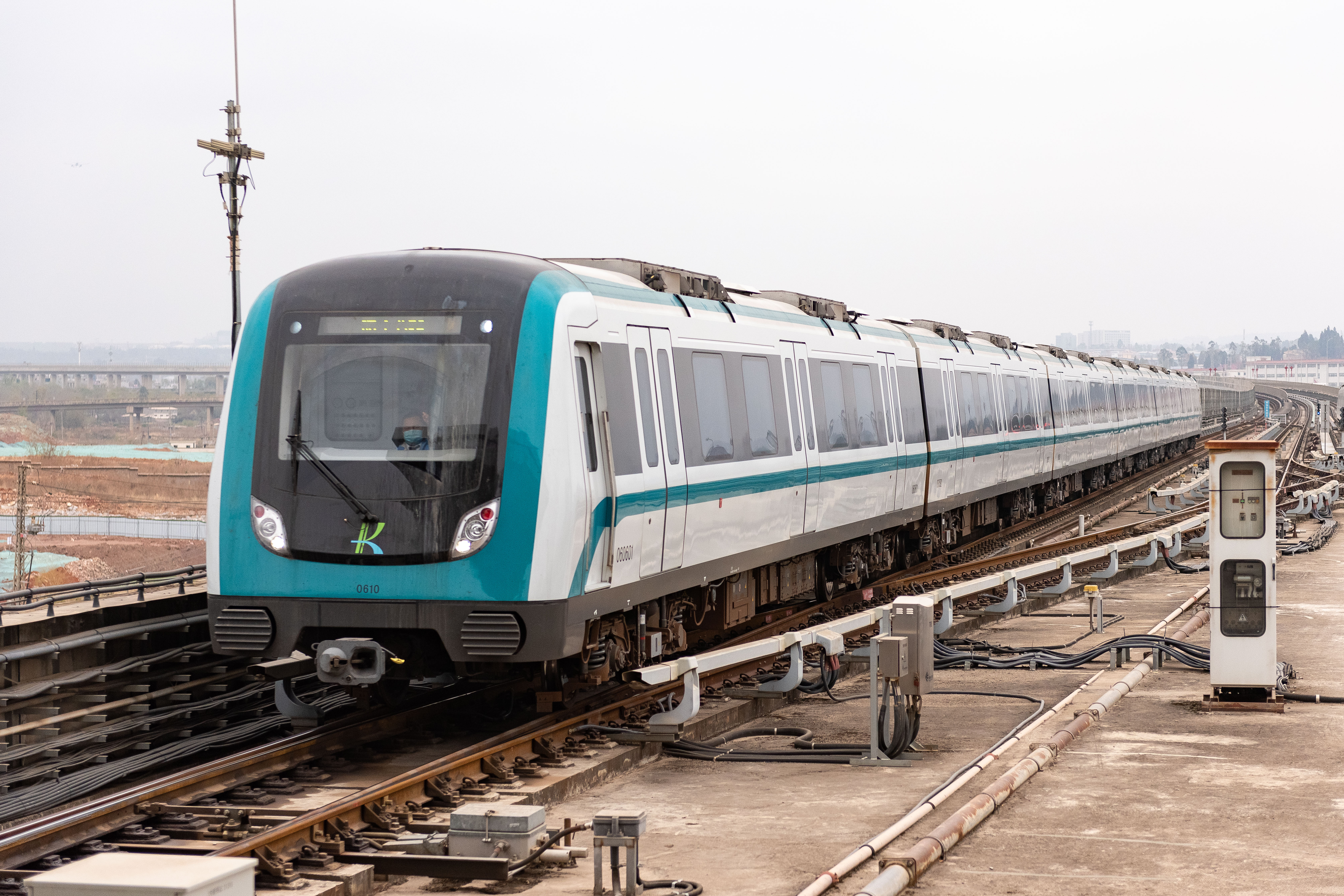
- Line 6 train entering Dabanqiao station

Overview
- Status: Operational
- Locale: Kunming, Yunnan Province, China
- Termini: Tangzixiang; Kunming Airport
- Stations: 8

Service
- Type: Rapid transit
- System: Kunming Metro
- Operator(s): Kunming Rail Transit Corp., Ltd
- Rolling stock: CSR Zhuzhou Type B (6B)

History
- Opened: 28 June 2012; 14 years ago

Technical
- Line length: 25.3 km (15.7 mi)
- Num of tracks: 2
- Track gauge: 1,435 mm (4 ft 8 1/2 in)

The Line 6 of the Kunming Metro (Chinese: 昆明轨道交通6号线; pinyin: Kūnmíng Guǐdào Jiāotōng Liù Hào Xiàn) also known as Airport line (Chinese: 机场线; pinyin: Jīchǎng Xiàn) is a rapid transit line that connects the Kunming Changshui International Airport with Kunming's urban center. The line is currently 25.3 kilometres (15.7 mi) in length with 8 stations.

The line entered into operation on 28 June 2012, and ceased operation temporarily beginning May 2016 in order to coordinate work related to the opening of Line 3 scheduled for early 2017. Finally, it reopened in August 2017 along with Line 3.

On subway maps, the line's color is teal.

== Opening timeline ==
| Segment | Commencement | Length | Station(s) | Name |
|---|---|---|---|---|
| East Coach Station — Kunming Airport | 28 June 2012 | 18.018 km (11.196 mi) | 2 | Phase 1 |
| East Coach Station — Kunming Airport | 5 March 2016 | Temporary ceased operation | -2 | Line 3 & 6 connector project |
| East Coach Station — Kunming Airport | 29 August 2017 | Reentered operation | 2 | Line 3 & 6 connector project |
| Dabanqiao, Airport Front | 29 August 2017 | Infill stations | 2 | |
| Tangzixiang — East Coach Station | 23 September 2020 | 7.3 km (4.5 mi) | 4 | Phase 2 |

== Hours of Operation ==
Currently the hours of operation for Line 6, from 6:00 AM to 22:00 PM daily. Frequency averages 15 minutes.

Line 6 trains travels at speeds of up to 100 kilometres per hour (62 mph). On the initial operation one-way trip will take approximately 20 minutes.

== Route ==
Line 6 runs in Panlong District and Guandu District.

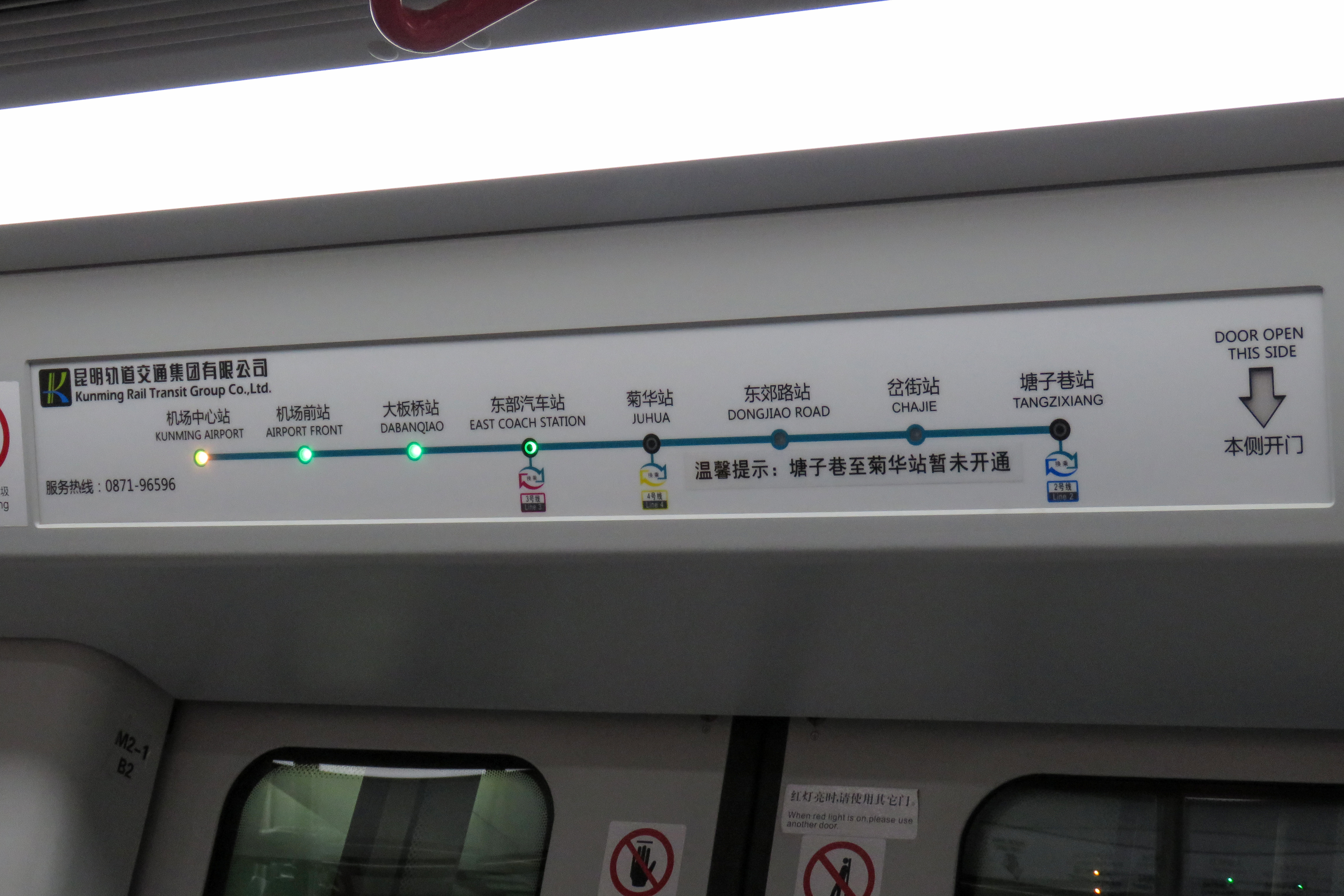
Route diagram on Line 6, Kunming Metro

| Station Name | | Connections | Distance km | | Location |
| English | Chinese | Connections | Distance km | | Location |
|---|---|---|---|---|---|
| Tangzixiang | 塘子巷 | 2 | 0.00 | 0.00 | Panlong/Guandu |
| Chajie | 岔街 | | | | Panlong/Guandu |
| Dongjiao Road | 东郊路 | | | | Guandu |
| Juhua | 菊华 | 4 | | | Guandu |
| East Coach Station | 东部汽车站 | 3 | 0.00 | 0.00 | Panlong |
| Dabanqiao | 大板桥 | | 9.73 | 9.73 | Guandu |
| Airport Front | 机场前 | | 5.36 | 15.09 | Guandu |
| Kunming Airport | 机场中心 | KMG | 2.09 | 17.18 | Guandu |

== History ==
Construction of Line 6 began on 1 August 2010. Track-laying was completed around December 2011. Line 6 opened to public operation on 28 June 2012 with two initial stations (East Coach Station and Kunming Airport), on the opening day of Kunming Changshui International Airport to serve the passengers from the new airport to downtown Kunming.

== Gallery ==
Stations of Line 6

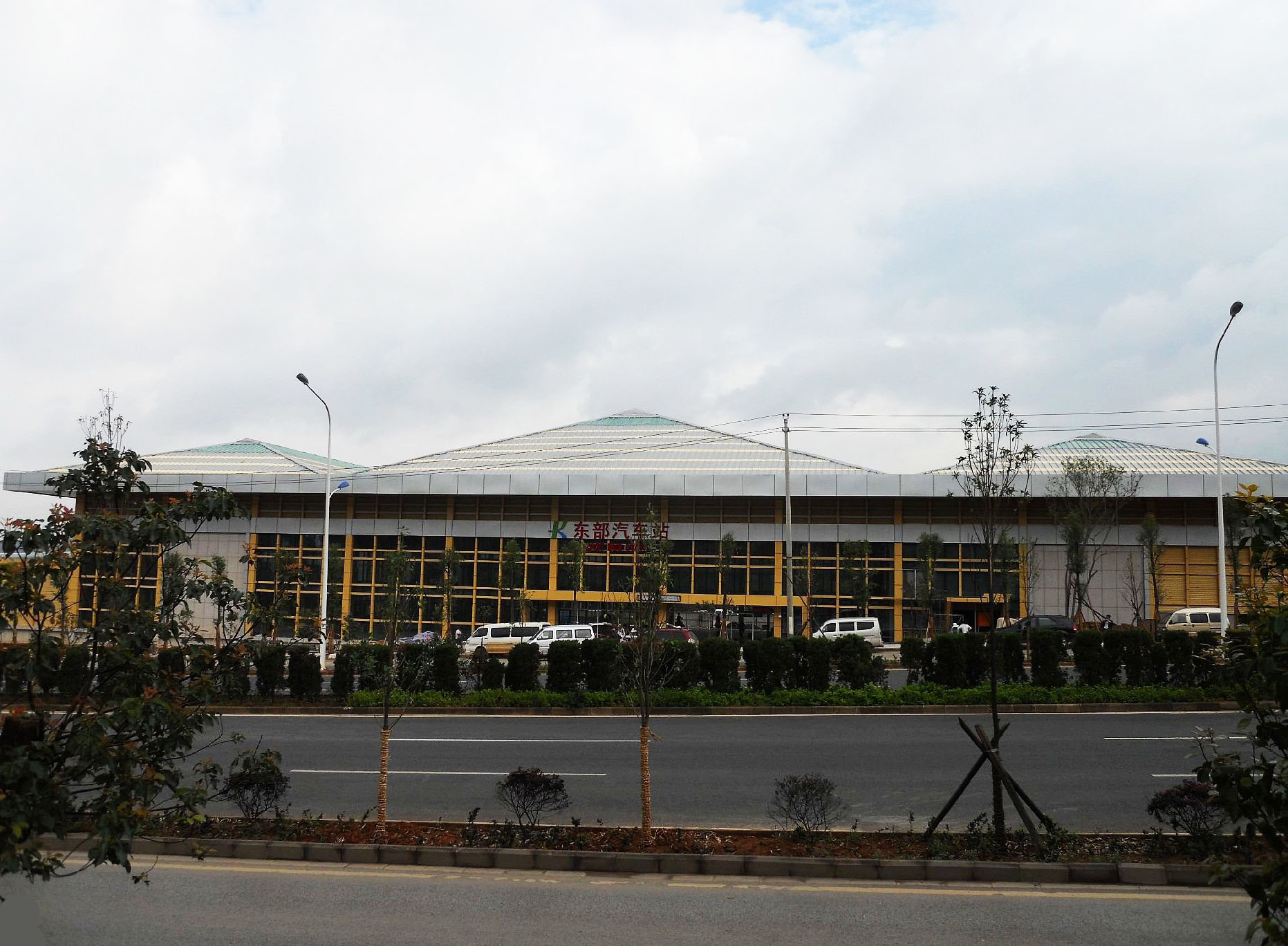
East Coach Station

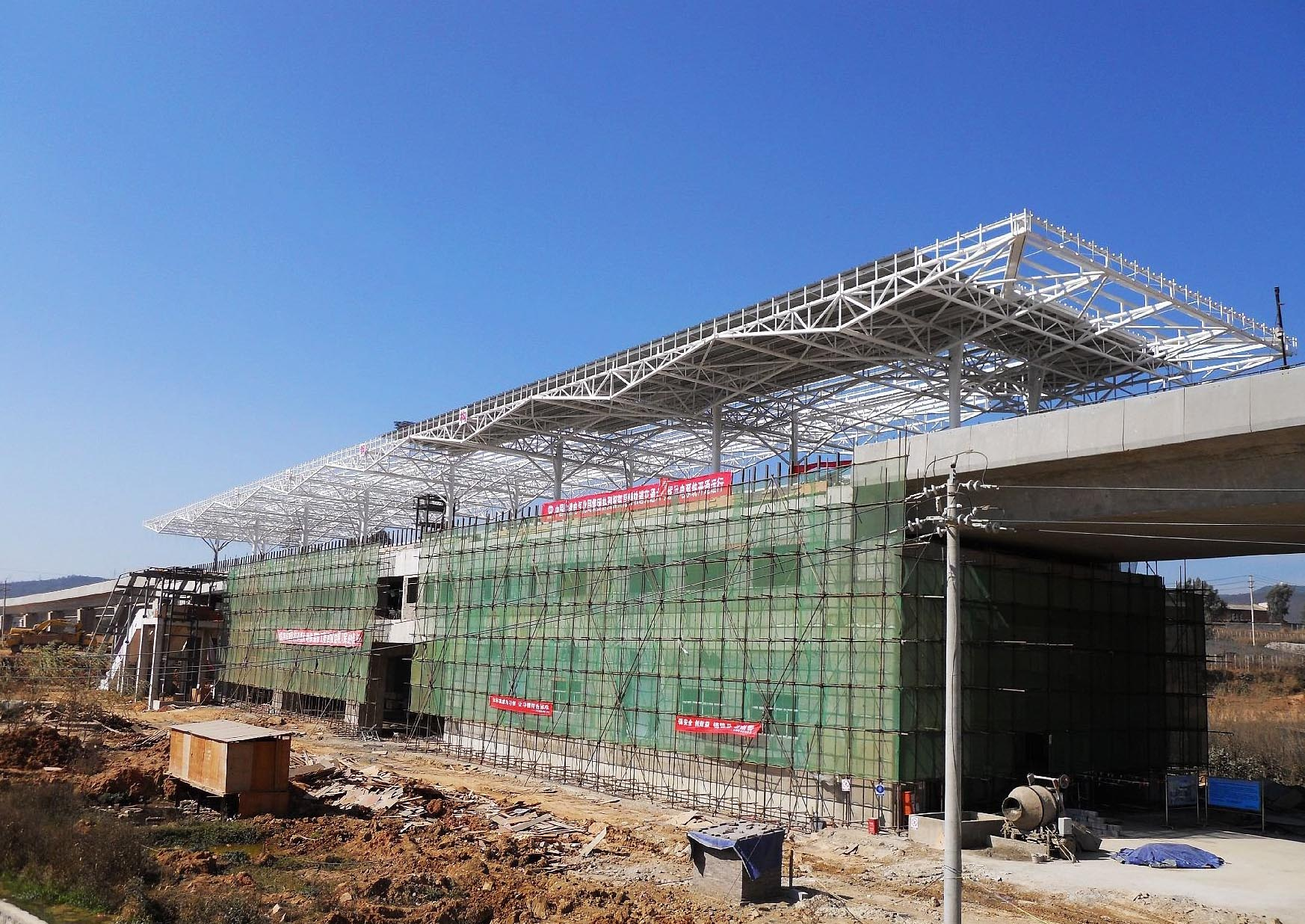
Dabanqiao

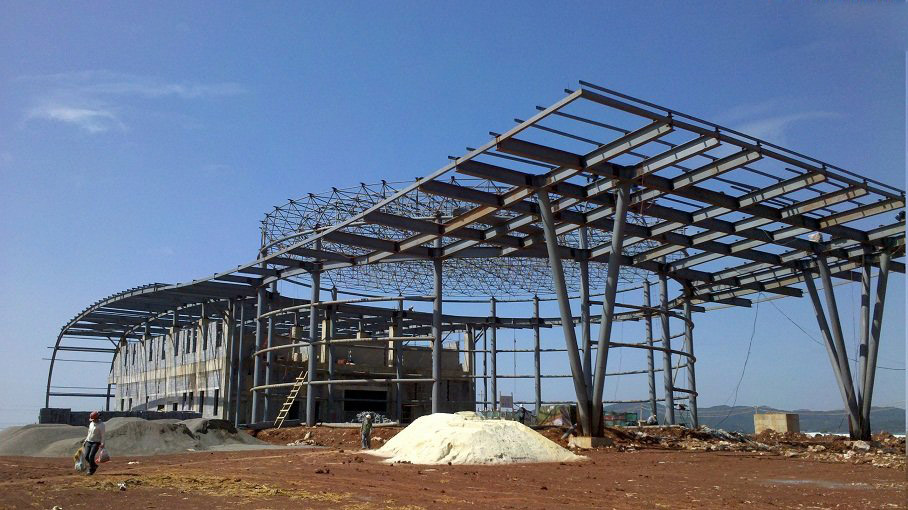
Airport Front

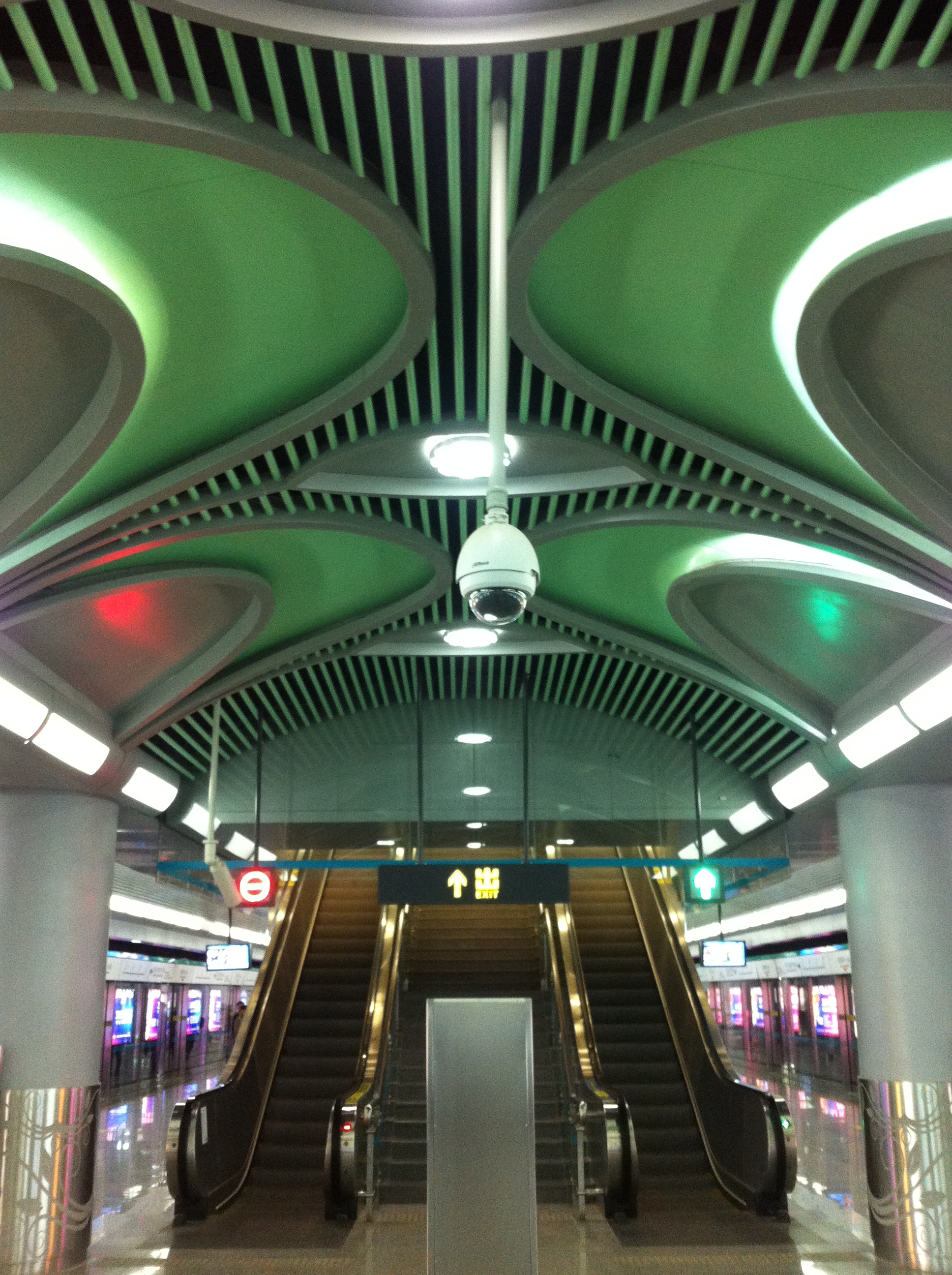
Kunming Airport

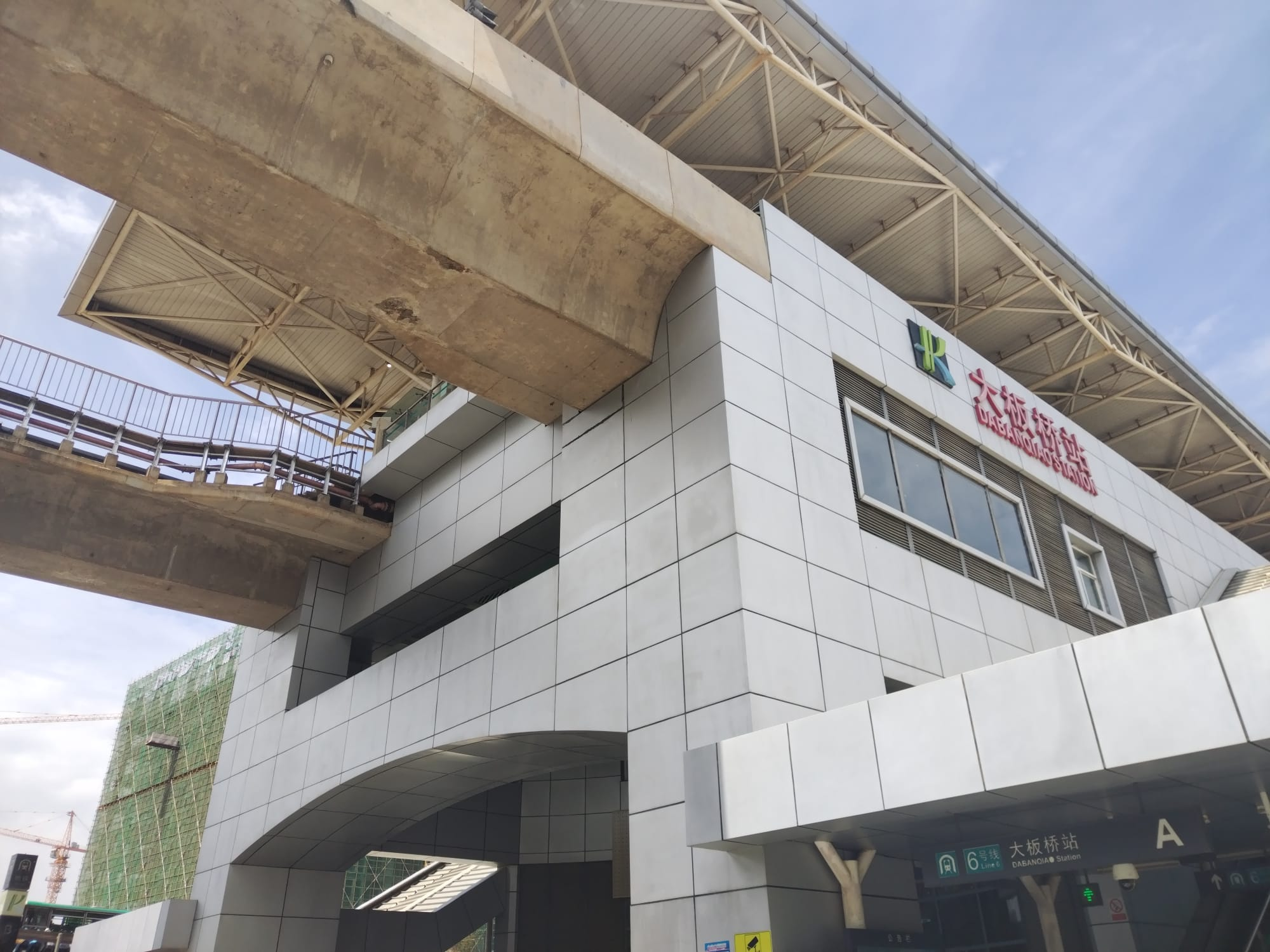
Current View of DaBanQiao Station

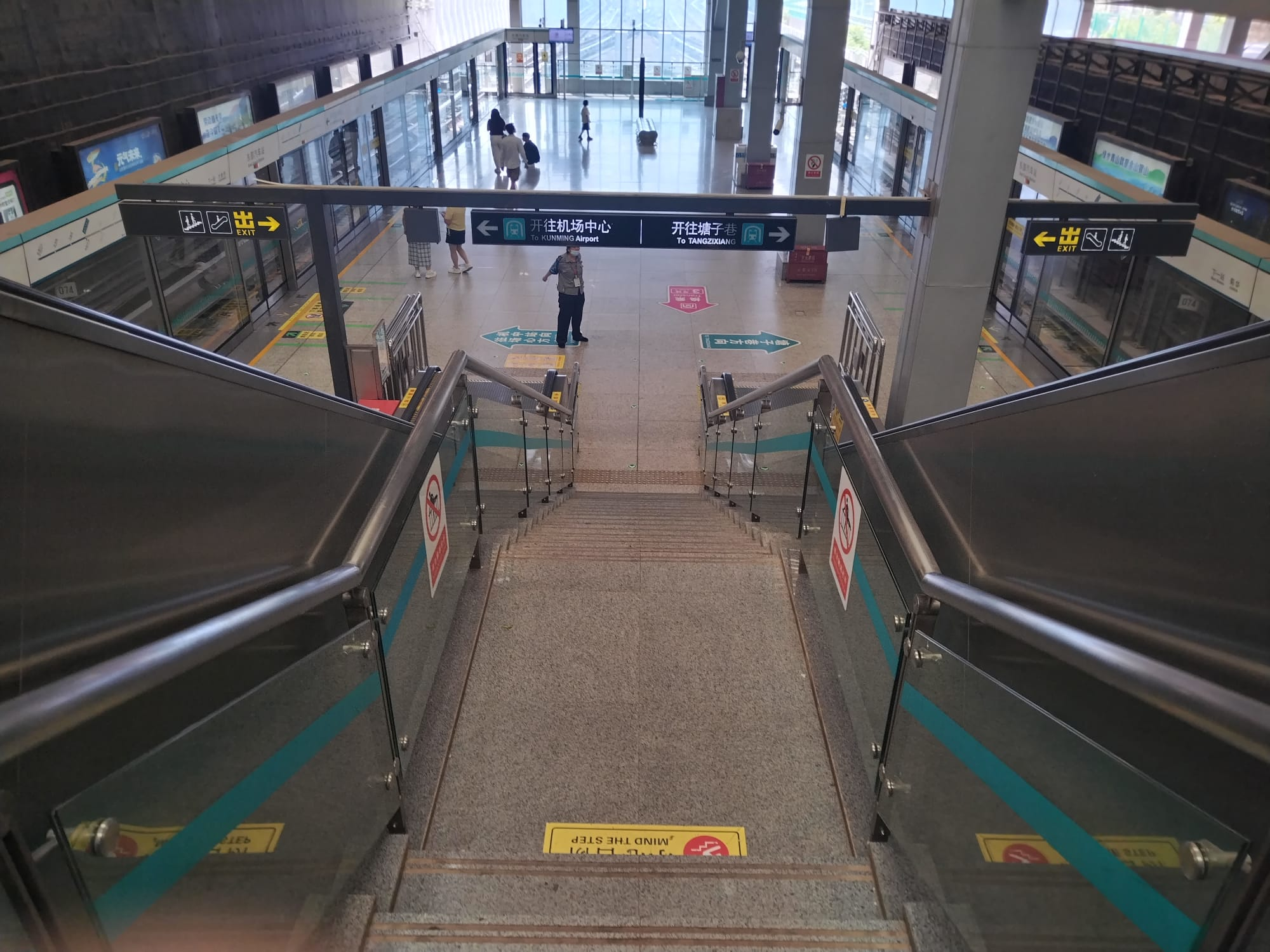
Staircase leading onto line 6 platform at East Coach Station

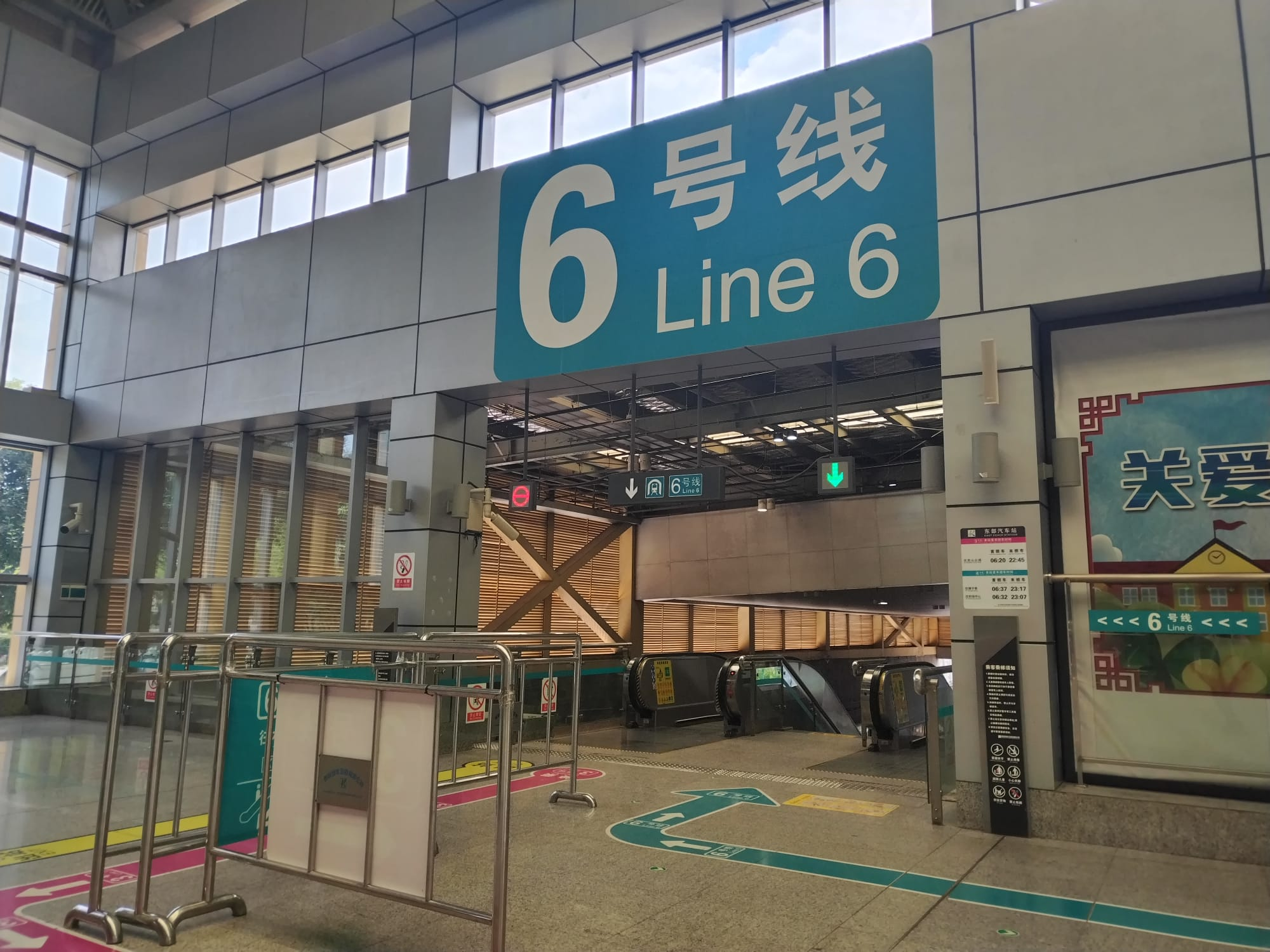
East Coach Station Concourse
