= Termini Station =

Termini Station or Stazione Termini may refer to:

- Roma Termini railway station, a railway station in Rome
  - Termini (Rome Metro), an underground station
- Termini Station (film), a 1989 Canadian film
- Terminal Station (film), a 1953 Italian film, titled Stazione Termini in Italian

== See also ==
- Termini (disambiguation)
