= Air pollution in Macau =

Air pollution in Macau is considered a serious problem. Cases of asthma and bronchial infections have soared in recent years due to reduced air quality.

== Sources ==
Factories in the Mainland are a significant cause of air pollution in Macau. The rapid industrialization of Shenzhen and the Pearl River Delta region in the 1980s and 90s, along with increasing development in Zhuhai are major contributors. The appearance and continued worsening of this phenomenon may possibly be explained by the rapid increase in the number of factories across the border.

== Health implications ==
The mortality rate from vehicular pollution can be twice as high near heavily traveled roads, based on a study conducted in Holland at residences 50 meters from a main road and 100 meters from a freeway. Since tens of thousands of people in Macau live and work in close proximity to busy roads, this presents a major health risk to city residents.

Pollution is dramatically harming not only the health of citizens of Macau but also its economy, particularly relating to the ability to attract skilled foreign labour.

== Air Quality Index Bulletin ==
Street-level air quality regularly falls short of the government’s Air Quality Objectives, and even further short of the World Health Organization (WHO) Air Quality Guidelines, revised in October.

== See also ==
- Healthcare in Macau
- Air Pollution in China
- Air pollution in Hong Kong
