= Airport station (Macau Light Rapid Transit) =

Macau Light Rapid Transit station

Aeroporto 機場
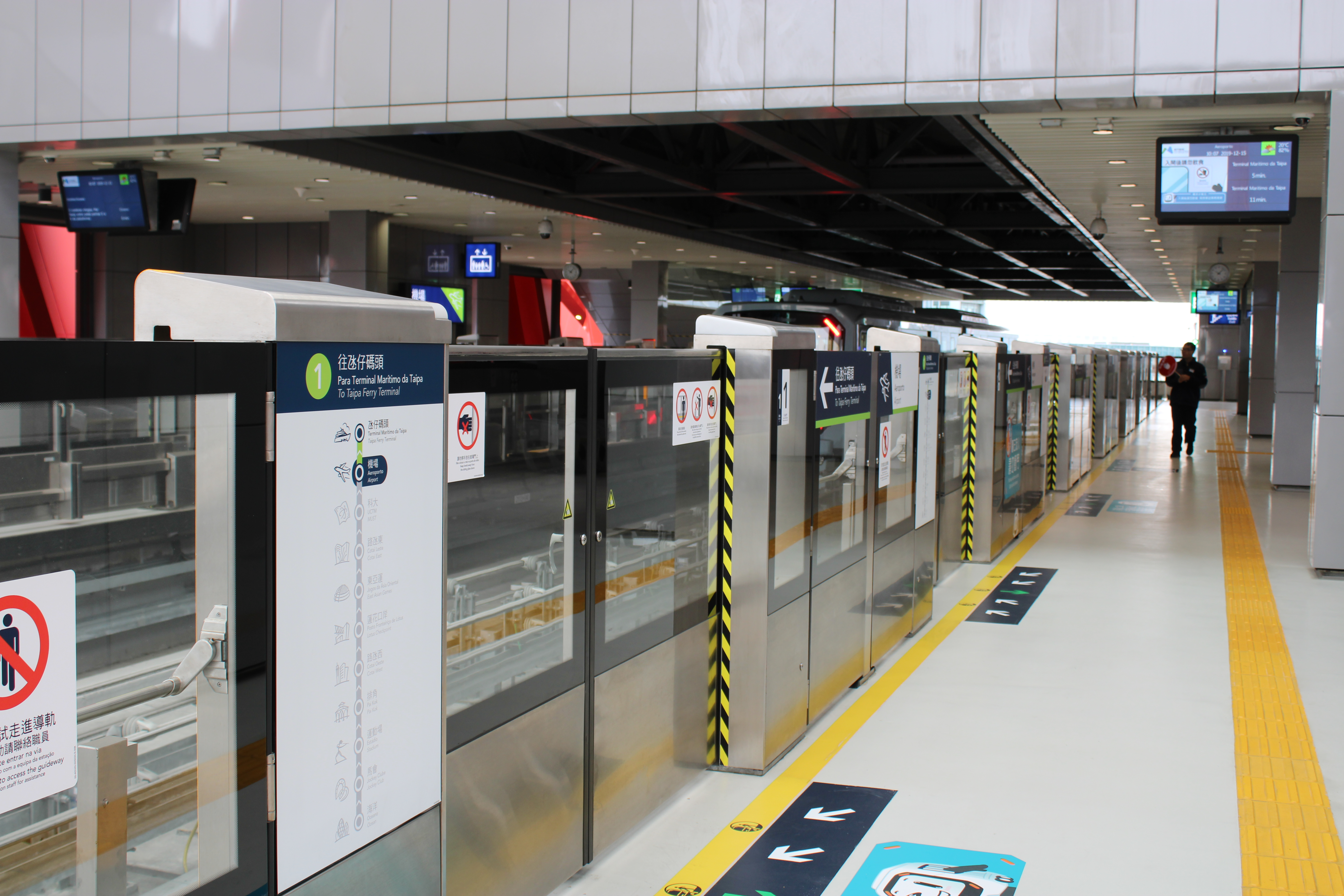
- Platform 1 of Airport station, December 2019

General information
- Location: Avenida Wai Long; Freguesia de Nossa Senhora do Carmo; Macau
- Coordinates: 22.159339°N 113.574636°E
- Operated by: MTR (Macau)
- Line(s): Taipa
- Platforms: 2 side platforms

Construction
- Structure type: Elevated

Other information
- Station code: ST22

History
- Opened: 10 December 2019

Services
Preceding station	Macau Light Rapid Transit	Following station
MUST towards Barra	Taipa line	Taipa Ferry Terminal Terminus
Route map
Location

Airport station (Chinese: 機場站; Portuguese: Estação do Aeroporto) is a station on Taipa line of the Macau Light Rapid Transit that connects the adjacent Macau International Airport.

== History ==
Building work of this station began in 2012. As part of the construction the old pedestrian bridge linking the airport and the opposing Golden Crown China Hotel was demolished in 2014, while the station was completed in 2015. A new bridge was built in 2016 that connects the two places via the station.

Due to ongoing work at Taipa line train depot, the opening of the station was delayed until 10 December 2019 along with the whole Taipa line.

== Station layout ==
Two side platforms are on the first floor, and ticket hall is located on the second floor. This is the only station in the system that uses red as the theme colour.

- Exit A: Taipa Grande, Macau Convention Centre, Golden Crown China Hotel, Macau Refuse Incineration Plant
- Exit B: Macau International Airport
