= Airport station (Gwangju) =

Metro station in Gwangju, South Korea

115 공항 Airport
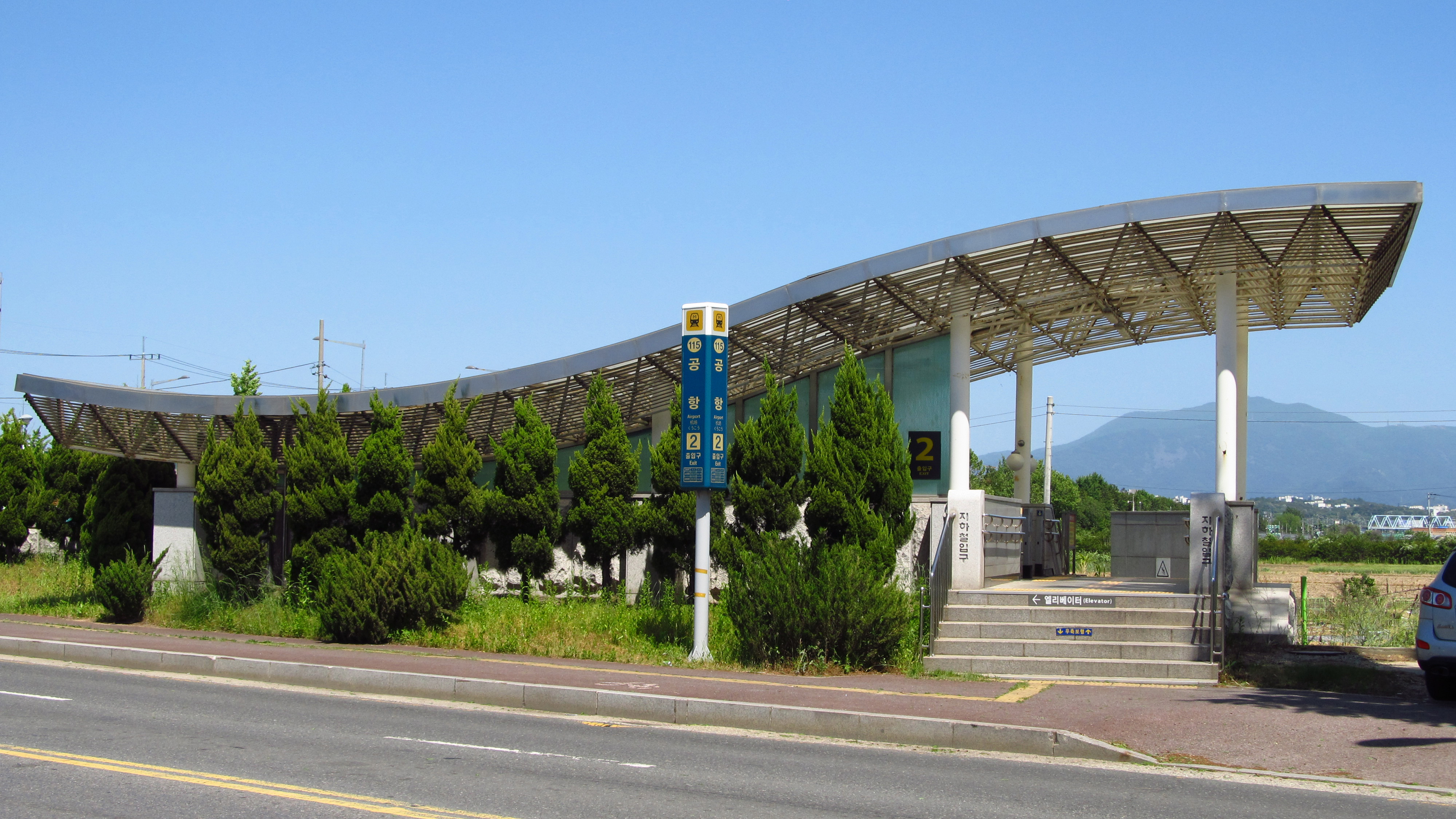
- Airport station exit no. 2

Korean name
- Hangul: 공항역
- Hanja: 空港驛
- RR: Gonghang-yeok
- MR: Konghang-yŏk

General information
- Location: Sinchon-dong, Gwangsan District, Gwangju; South Korea
- Coordinates: 35°08′39″N 126°48′42″E
- Operator: Gwangju Metropolitan Rapid Transit Corporation
- Line: Line 1
- Platforms: 2
- Tracks: 2

Construction
- Structure type: Underground

Other information
- Station code: 115

History
- Opened: April 11, 2008

Services
Preceding station	Gwangju Metro	Following station
Kim Daejung Convention Center towards Nokdong	Line 1	Songjeong Park towards Pyeongdong
Location

Airport station (Korean: 공항역; Hanja: 空港驛) is a station of Gwangju Metro Line 1 in Sinchon-dong, Gwangsan District, Gwangju, South Korea. The station serves Gwangju Airport, and there is a connection to the Kim Daejung Convention Center station via Gukrak Bridge Haje Tunnel.

== Features ==
It is about 300m away from Gwangju Airport, but the frequency of use is low, and after the opening of GwangjuSongjeong Station on the Honam High-Speed Rail, the demand has been distributed to Gwangju Songjeong Station operated by Gwangju Metro, and the utilization rate has been decreasing.

== Station layout ==
G	Street Level	Exits
L1	Concourse	Faregates, Ticketing Machines, Station Control
L2; Platforms	Side platform, doors will open on the right
L2; Platforms	Southbound	← Line 1 toward Nokdong (Kim Daejung Convention Center)
L2; Platforms	Northbound	→ Line 1 toward Pyeongdong (Songjeong Park) →
L2; Platforms	Side platform, doors will open on the right
