= Xinshi, Ürümqi =

Xinshi: 新市区 (Chinese); يېڭىشەھەر رايونى (Uyghur)
- District
- New Urban Area
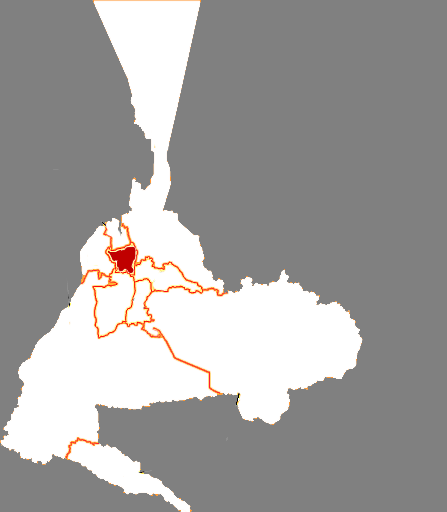
- Xinshi in Ürümqi

- Location of the seat in Xinjiang Xinshi (Xinjiang) Xinshi (China)
- Coordinates: 43°50′38″N 87°34′26″E
- Country: China
- Autonomous region: Xinjiang
- Prefecture-level city: Ürümqi
- District seat: Gaoxin Street Subdistrict

Area
  - Total: 158.7 km^{2} (61.3 sq mi)

Population (2020)
  - Total: 1,011,440
  - Density: 6,373/km^{2} (16,510/sq mi)
- Time zone: UTC+8 (China Standard (Note: Locals in Xinjiang frequently observe UTC+6 (Xinjiang Time), 2 hours behind Beijing.))
- Website: www.uhdz.gov.cn

Xinshi, Ürümqi

Chinese name
- Simplified Chinese: 新市区
- Traditional Chinese: 新市區
Transcriptions
Standard Mandarin
- Hanyu Pinyin: Xīnshì Qū

Uyghur name
- Uyghur: يېڭىشەھەر رايونى
Transcriptions
- Latin Yëziqi: Yëngisheher Rayoni
- Yengi Yeziⱪ: Yengixəhər Rayoni
- Siril Yëziqi: Йеңишәхәр Райони

Xinshi District (Chinese: 新市区; pinyin: Xīnshì Qū; Uyghur: يېڭىشەھەر رايونى, romanized: Yéngisheher Rayoni, Yengixəhər Rayoni, Йеңишәхәр Райони) is one of 7 urban districts of the prefecture-level city of Ürümqi, the capital of Xinjiang Uygur Autonomous Region, Northwest China.

Xinshi District is also known by its external name Ürümqi high-tech Industrial Development Zone (Chinese: 乌鲁木齐高新技术产业开发区; Uyghur: يۇقىرى، يېڭى تېخنىكىلىق كەسىپلەر تەرەققىيات رايونى). It contains an area of 142 km^{2} (55 sq mi). According to the 2002 census, it has a population of 360,000. Diwopu Airport is in the township.

When it existed, China Xinjiang Airlines had its headquarters on the airport property.

== Administrative divisions ==
Xinshi District contains 17 subdistricts, 1 town and 4 townships:

Name	Simplified Chinese	Hanyu Pinyin	Uyghur (UEY)	Uyghur Latin (ULY)	Administrative division code
Subdistricts
Beijing Road Subdistrict	北京路街道	Běijīnglù Jiēdào	بېيجىڭ يولى كوچا باشقارمىسى	Bëyjing yoli kocha bashqarmisi	650104001
Ergong Subdistrict	二工街道	Èrgōng Jiēdào	ئەرگۇڭ كوچا باشقارمىسى	Ergung kocha bashqarmisi	650104002
Sangong Subdistrict	三工街道	Sāngōng Jiēdào	سەنگۇڭ كوچا باشقارمىسى	Sengung kocha bashqarmisi	650104003
Petroleum New Village Subdistrict	石油新村街道	Shíyóuxīncūn Jiēdào	نېفىت يېڭى كەنتى كوچا باشقارمىسى	Nëfit yëngi kenti kocha bashqarmisi	650104004
Yingbin Road Subdistrict	迎宾路街道	Yíngbīnlù Jiēdào	يىڭبىن يولى كوچا باشقارمىسى	Yingbin yoli kocha bashqarmisi	650104005
Kashgar East Road Subdistrict	喀什东路街道	Kāshídōnglù Jiēdào	قەشقەر شەرقىي يولى كوچا باشقارمىسى	Qeshqer sherqiy yoli kocha bashqarmisi	650104006
Bajiahu Subdistrict	八家户街道	Bājiāhù Jiēdào	باجياخۇ كوچا باشقارمىسى	Bajyaxu kocha bashqarmisi	650104009
Yinchuan Road Subdistrict	银川路街道	Yínchuānlù Jiēdào	يىنچۇەن يولى كوچا باشقارمىسى	Yinchuen yoli kocha bashqarmisi	650104010
Nanwei Road Subdistrict	南纬路街道	Nánwěilù Jiēdào	جەنۇبىي پاراللېل يولى كوچا باشقارمىسى	Jenubiy parallël yoli kocha bashqarmisi	650104011
Hangzhou Road Subdistrict	杭州路街道	Hángzhōulù Jiēdào	خاڭجۇ يولى كوچا باشقارمىسى	Xangju yoli kocha bashqarmisi	650104012
Liyushan Subdistrict	鲤鱼山街道	Lǐyúshān Jiēdào	ليۇشەن كوچا باشقارمىسى	Lyushen kocha bashqarmisi	650104013
Baiyuan Road Subdistrict	百园路街道	Bǎiyuánlù Jiēdào	بەييۇەن يولى كوچا باشقارمىسى	Beyyuen yoli kocha bashqarmisi	650104014
Zhengyang Road Subdistrict	正扬路街道	Zhèngyánglù Jiēdào	جېڭياڭ يولى كوچا باشقارمىسى	Jëngyang yoli kocha bashqarmisi	650104015
Airport Subdistrict	机场街道	Jīchǎng Jiēdào	ئايروپورت كوچا باشقارمىسى	Ayroport kocha bashqarmisi	650104016
Youyi Road Subdistrict (Dostlukh Road Subdistrict)	友谊路街道	Yǒuyìlù Jiēdào	دوستلۇق يولى كوچا باشقارمىسى	Dostluq yoli kocha bashqarmisi	650104017
Gaoxin Street Subdistrict	高新街街道	Gāoxīnjiē Jiēdào	يۇقىرى، يېڭى تېخنىكا تەرەققىيات كوچىسى كوچا باشقارمىسى	Yuqiri, yëngi tëxnika tereqqiyat kochisi kocha bashqarmisi	650104018
Changchun Middle Road Subdistrict	长春中路街道	Chángchūnzhōnglù Jiēdào	ئوتتۇرا چاڭچۇن يولى كوچا باشقارمىسى	Ottura changchun yoli kocha bashqarmisi	650104019
Towns
Anningqu Town	安宁渠镇	Ānníngqú Zhèn	ئەنەنچۈ بازىرى	Enenchü baziri	650104100
Townships
Ergong Township	二工乡	Èrgōng Xiāng	ئەرگۇڭ يېزىسى	Ergung yëzisi	650104200
Diwopu Township	地窝堡乡	Dìwōpù Xiāng	دىۋوپۇ يېزىسى	Diwopu yëzisi	650104201
Qinggedahu Township	青格达湖乡	Qīnggédáhú Xiāng	چىڭگېداخۇ يېزىسى	Chinggêdaxu yëzisi	650104202
Liushihu Township	六十户乡	Liùshíhù Xiāng	ليۇشىخۇ يېزىسى	Lyushixu yëzisi	650104203

== Climate ==
Climate data for Xinshi District (Ürümqi Diwopu International Airport), elevation 654 m (2,146 ft), (2012–2024 normals)
Month	Jan	Feb	Mar	Apr	May	Jun	Jul	Aug	Sep	Oct	Nov	Dec	Year
Mean daily maximum °C (°F)	−9.7 (14.5)	−5.6 (21.9)	7.2 (45.0)	19.9 (67.8)	25.7 (78.3)	30.4 (86.7)	32.7 (90.9)	30.9 (87.6)	25.0 (77.0)	15.6 (60.1)	3.2 (37.8)	−7.2 (19.0)	14.0 (57.2)
Daily mean °C (°F)	−13.4 (7.9)	−9.8 (14.4)	3.0 (37.4)	14.6 (58.3)	20.2 (68.4)	25.2 (77.4)	27.6 (81.7)	25.8 (78.4)	19.8 (67.6)	10.9 (51.6)	−0.3 (31.5)	−10.4 (13.3)	9.4 (49.0)
Mean daily minimum °C (°F)	−17.2 (1.0)	−13.9 (7.0)	−1.2 (29.8)	9.2 (48.6)	14.6 (58.3)	20.0 (68.0)	22.5 (72.5)	20.8 (69.4)	14.7 (58.5)	6.1 (43.0)	−3.8 (25.2)	−13.6 (7.5)	4.9 (40.7)
Average relative humidity (%)	82.5	79.6	67.6	39.4	35.3	35.5	35.5	37.7	39.1	51.0	73.5	83.4	55.0
Source: IEM
