= Toutunhe, Ürümqi =

Toutunhe: 头屯河区 (Chinese); تۇدۇڭخابا رايونى (Uyghur)
- District
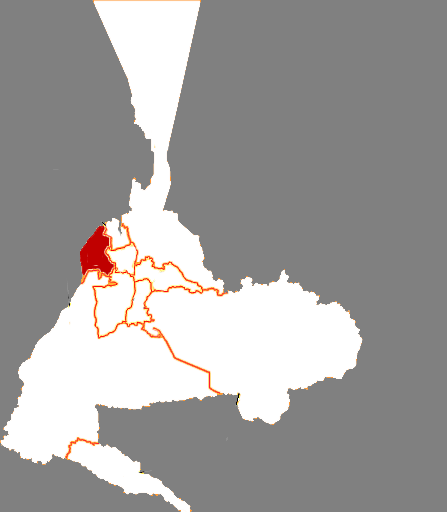
- Toutunhe in Ürümqi

- Location of the seat in Xinjiang Toutunhe (Xinjiang) Toutunhe (China)
- Coordinates: 43°52′41″N 87°25′41″E
- Country: China
- Autonomous region: Xinjiang
- Prefecture-level city: Ürümqi
- District seat: Songshan Street Area Subdistrict

Area
  - Total: 363.9 km^{2} (140.5 sq mi)

Population (2020)
  - Total: 419,022
  - Density: 1,151/km^{2} (2,982/sq mi)
- Time zone: UTC+8 (China Standard (Note: Locals in Xinjiang frequently observe UTC+6 (Xinjiang Time), 2 hours behind Beijing.))
- Website: www.uetd.gov.cn

Toutunhe, Ürümqi

Chinese name
- Simplified Chinese: 头屯河区
- Traditional Chinese: 頭屯河區
Transcriptions
Standard Mandarin
- Hanyu Pinyin: Tóutúnhé Qū

Uyghur name
- Uyghur: تۇدۇڭخابا رايونى
Transcriptions
- Latin Yëziqi: Tudungxaba Rayoni
- Yengi Yeziⱪ: Tudunghaba Rayoni
- Siril Yëziqi: Тудуңхаба Райони

The Toutunhe District (Chinese: 头屯河区; pinyin: Tóutúnhé Qū; Uyghur: تۇدۇڭخابا رايونى, romanized: Tudungxaba Rayoni, Tudunghaba Rayoni, Тудуңхаба Райони) is one of 7 urban districts of the prefecture-level city of Ürümqi, the capital of Xinjiang Uygur Autonomous Region, Northwest China, it is located to the northwest of Ürümqi's urban core. It contains an area of 276 km^{2} (107 sq mi). According to the 2002 census, it has a population of 130,000.

Toutunhe District is also known by its external name Ürümqi Economic & Technological Development Zone (Chinese: 乌鲁木齐经济技术开发区, Uyghur: ئۈرۈمچى ئىقتىسادىي تېخنىكا تەرەققىيات رايونى).

== Administrative divisions ==
Toutunhe District contains 14 subdistricts:

Name	Simplified Chinese	Hanyu Pinyin	Uyghur (UEY)	Uyghur Latin (ULY)	Administrative division code
Subdistricts
Gangcheng Area Subdistrict	钢城片区街道	Gāngchéng Piànqū Jiēdào	پولات-تۆمۈر شەھەرچىسى تەۋەلىك رايونى كوچا باشقارمىسى	Polat-tömür sheherchisi tewelik rayoni kocha bashqarmisi	650106001
West Railway Station Area Subdistrict	火车西站片区街道	Huǒchēxīzhàn Piànqū Jiēdào	غەربىي ۋوگزال تەۋەلىك رايونى كوچا باشقارمىسى	Gherbiy wogzal tewelik rayoni kocha bashqarmisi	650106002
Wangjiagou Area Subdistrict	王家沟片区街道	Wángjiāgōu Piànqū Jiēdào	ۋاڭجياگۇ تەۋەلىكى كوچا باشقارمىسى	Wangjyagu teweliki kocha bashqarmisi	650106003
Wuchang Road Area Subdistrict	乌昌路片区街道	Wūchānglù Piànqū Jiēdào	ئۈرۈمچى-سانجى يولى كوچا باشقارمىسى	Ürümchi-sanji yoli kocha bashqarmisi	650106004
Beizhan West Road Area Subdistrict	北站西路片区街道	Běizhànxīlù Piànqū Jiēdào	شىمالىي ۋوگزال شەرقىي يولى كوچا باشقارمىسى	Shimaliy wogzal sherqiy yoli kocha bashqarmisi	650106005
Zhongya North Road Area Subdistrict	中亚北路片区街道	Zhōngyàběilù Piànqū Jiēdào	شىمالىي ئوتتۇرا ئاسىيا يولى كوچا باشقارمىسى	Shimaliy Ottura Asiya yoli kocha bashqarmisi	650106007
Zhongya South Road Area Subdistrict	中亚南路片区街道	Zhōngyànánlù Piànqū Jiēdào	جەنۇبىي ئوتتۇرا ئاسىيا يولى كوچا باشقارمىسى	Jenubiy Ottura Asiya yoli kocha bashqarmisi	650106008
Songshan Street Area Subdistrict	嵩山街片区街道	Sōngshānjiē Piànqū Jiēdào	سۇڭشەن كوچىسى كوچا باشقارمىسى	Sungshen kochisi kocha bashqarmisi	650106009
High-speed Rail Area Subdistrict	高铁片区街道	Gāotiě Piànqū Jiēdào	يۇقىرى سۈرەتلىك تۆمۈريول ۋوگزالى باشقۇرۇش كوچا باشقارمىسى	Yuqiri süretlik tömüryol wogzali bashqurush kocha bashqarmisi	650106010
Bainiao Lake Area Subdistrict (Akhkhux Lake Area Subdistrict)	白鸟湖片区街道	Báiniǎohú Piànqū Jiēdào	ئاققۇش كۆلى باشقۇرۇش كوچا باشقارمىسى	Aqqush köli bashqurush kocha bashqarmisi	650106011
Xihu Area Subdistrict	西湖片区街道	Xīhú Piànqū Jiēdào	شىخۇ تەۋەلىك رايونى كوچا باشقارمىسى	Shixu tewelik rayoni kocha bashqarmisi	650106012
Beizhan East Road Area Subdistrict	北站东路片区街道	Běizhàndōnglù Piànqū Jiēdào	شىمالىي ۋوگزال شەرقىي يولى كوچا باشقارمىسى	Shimaliy wogzal sherqiy yoli kocha bashqarmisi	650106013
Lianghe Area Subdistrict	两河片区街道	Liǎnghé Piànqū Jiēdào	ئىككى دەريا تەۋەلىكىنى كوچا باشقارمىسى	Ikki derya tewelikini kocha bashqarmisi	650106014
Ürümqi Station Area Subdistrict	乌鲁木齐站片区街道	Wūlǔmùqízhàn Piànqū Jiēdào			650106015
