= Tianshan, Ürümqi =

Tianshan: 天山区 (Chinese); تەڭرىتاغ رايونى (Uyghur)
- District
- Night view of buildings in Tianshan District

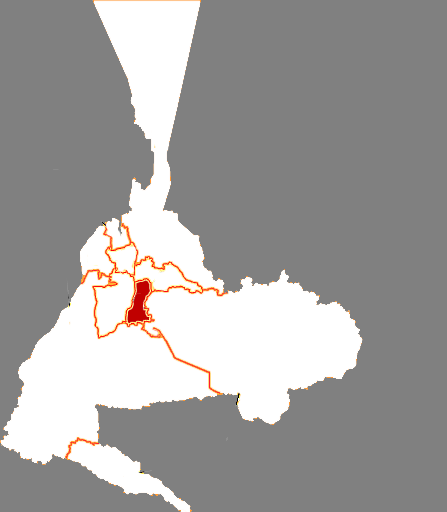
- Location in Ürümqi

- Location of the seat in Xinjiang Tianshan (China)
- Coordinates: 43°48′N 87°35′E
- Country: China
- Autonomous region: Xinjiang
- Prefecture-level city: Ürümqi
- District seat: Xingfu Road Subdistrict

Area
  - Total: 170.8 km^{2} (65.9 sq mi)

Population (2020)
  - Total: 652,792
  - Density: 3,822/km^{2} (9,899/sq mi)
- Time zone: UTC+8 (China Standard (Note: Locals in Xinjiang frequently observe UTC+6 (Xinjiang Time), 2 hours behind Beijing.))
- Website: www.xjtsq.gov.cn

Tianshan, Ürümqi

Chinese name
- Simplified Chinese: 天山区
- Traditional Chinese: 天山區
Transcriptions
Standard Mandarin
- Hanyu Pinyin: Tiānshān Qū

Uyghur name
- Uyghur: تەڭرىتاغ رايونى
Transcriptions
- Latin Yëziqi: Tengritagh Rayoni
- Yengi Yeziⱪ: Təngritaƣ Rayoni
- Siril Yëziqi: Тәңритағ Райони

Tianshan District (Chinese: 天山区; pinyin: Tiānshān Qū; Uyghur: تەڭرىتاغ رايونى, romanized: Tengritagh Rayoni, Təngritaƣ Rayoni, Tengritag Rayoni, Тәңритағ Райони) is one of 7 urban districts of the prefecture-level city of Ürümqi, the capital of Xinjiang Uygur Autonomous Region, Northwest China. It is a core urban district of Ürümqi. It contains an area of 171 km^{2} (66 sq mi). According to the 2002 census, it has a population of 450,000.

== Administrative divisions ==
Tianshan District contains 16 subdistricts:

Name	Simplified Chinese	Hanyu Pinyin	Uyghur (UEY)	Uyghur Latin (ULY)	Administrative division code
Subdistricts
Yan'erwo Subdistrict (Kharlighaqlikh Subdistrict)	燕儿窝街道	Yàn'érwō Jiēdào	قارلىغاچلىق كوچا باشقارمىسى	Qarlighachliq kocha bashqarmisi	650102002
Shengli Road Subdistrict	胜利路街道	Shènglìlù Jiēdào	غالىبىيەت يولى كوچا باشقارمىسى	Ghalibiyet Yoli Kocha Bashqarmisi	650102003
Tuanjie Road Subdistrict	团结路街道	Tuánjiélù Jiēdào	ئىتتىپاق يولى كوچا باشقارمىسى	Ittipaq Yoli Kocha Bashqarmisi	650102004
Jiefang South Road Subdistrict	解放南路街道	Jiěfàngnánlù Jiēdào	ئازادلىق جەنۇبىي يولى كوچا باشقارمىسى	Azadliq Jenubiy Yoli Kocha Bashqarmisi	650102005
Xinhua South Road Subdistrict	新华南路街道	Xīnhuánánlù Jiēdào	شىنخۇا جەنۇبىي يولى كوچا باشقارمىسى	Shinxua Jenubiy Yoli Kocha Bashqarmisi	650102006
Heping Road Subdistrict	和平路街道	Hépínglù Jiēdào	تىنچلىق يولى كوچا باشقارمىسى	Tinchliq Yoli Kocha Bashqarmisi	650102007
Jiefang North Road Subdistrict	解放北路街道	Jiěfàngběilù Jiēdào	ئازادلىق شىمالىي يولى كوچا باشقارمىسى	Azadliq Shimaliy Yoli Kocha Bashqarmisi	650102008
Xingfu Road Subdistrict	幸福路街道	Xìngfúlù Jiēdào	بەخت يولى كوچا باشقارمىسى	Bext Yoli Kocha Bashqarmisi	650102009
Dongmen Subdistrict	东门街道	Dōngmén Jiēdào	دۇڭمېن كوچا باشقارمىسى	Dungmën Kocha Bashqarmisi	650102010
Xinhua North Road Subdistrict	新华北路街道	Xīnhuáběilù Jiēdào	شىنخۇا شىمالىي يولى كوچا باشقارمىسى	Shinxua Shimaliy Yoli Kocha Bashqarmisi	650102011
Qingnian Road Subdistrict	青年路街道	Qīngniánlù Jiēdào	ياشلار يولى كوچا باشقارمىسى	Yashlar Yoli Kocha Bashqarmisi	650102012
Jianquan Subdistrict	碱泉街道	Jiǎnquán Jiēdào	شوربۇلاق كوچا باشقارمىسى	Shorbulaq Kocha Bashqarmisi	650102013
Yan'an Road Subdistrict	延安路街道	Yán'ānlù Jiēdào	يەنئەن يولى كوچا باشقارمىسى	yen'en Yoli Kocha Bashqarmisi	650102014
Hongyan Subdistrict	红雁街道	Hóngyàn Jiēdào	خۇڭيەن كوچا باشقارمىسى	Xungyen Kocha Bashqarmisi	650102015
Nancaotan Subdistrict	南草滩街道	Náncǎotān Jiēdào	نەنساۋتەن كوچا باشقارمىسى	Nensawten Kocha Bashqarmisi	650102016
Dongquan Road Subdistrict	东泉路街道	Dōngquánlù Jiēdào	شەرقىي بۇلاق كوچا باشقارمىسى	Sherqiy Bulaq Kocha Bashqarmisi	650102017
