= List of longest tunnels =

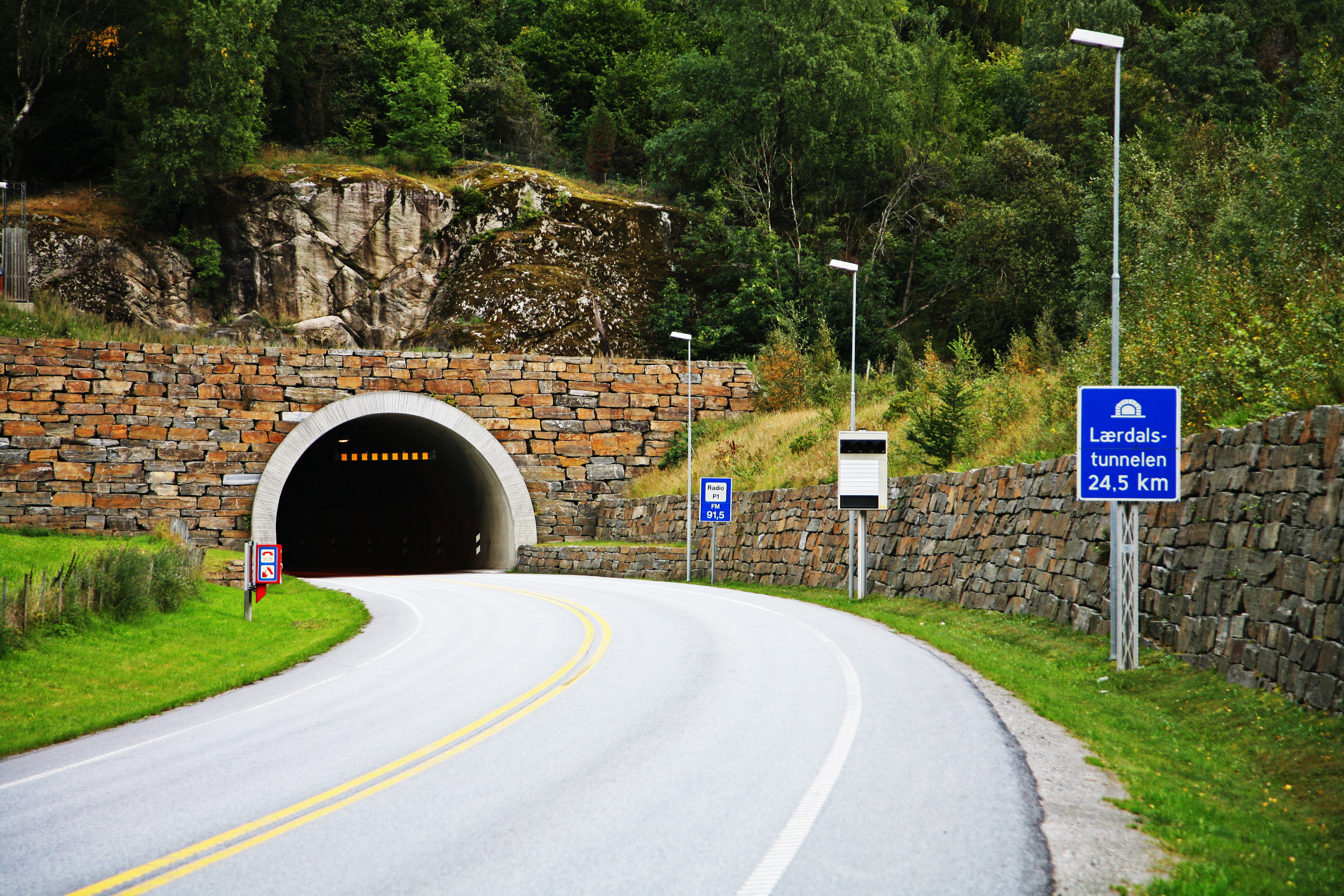
The southwest portal of the Lærdal Tunnel in Norway, the world's longest road tunnel

This list of longest tunnels ranks tunnels that are at least 13 km (8.1 mi) long. Only continuous tunnels are included. Pipelines, even those that are buried, are excluded. The longest tunnels have been constructed for water distribution, followed by tunnels for railways.

== World's longest tunnels (in use) ==
Type	Name	Location	Length	Year	Comment
Water supply	Delaware Aqueduct	New York State, United States	137,000 m (85.128 mi)	1945	4.1 m in diameter (13.2 m^{2}). New York City's main water supply tunnel.
Water supply	Päijänne Water Tunnel	Southern Finland, Finland	120,000 m (74.565 mi)	1982	16 m^{2} cross section. Main water supply tunnel for the Helsinki metropolitan area in southern Finland, drilled through solid rock.
Metro	Suzhou Metro Line 3-11	Suzhou, China	86,542 m (53.775 mi)	2019–2023	Suzhou Metro Line 11 and Line 3 are connected at Weiting station with through trains operating. Longest metro tunnel.
Water supply	Dahuofang Water Tunnel	Liaoning, China	85,320 m (53.015 mi)	2009	8 m in diameter (50 m^{2} cross section)
Water supply	Orange–Fish River Tunnel	South Africa	82,800 m (51.450 mi)	1972	Longest continuous enclosed aqueduct in the Southern Hemisphere (22.5 m^{2} cross section). Built to divert water from the Orange River to the Great Fish River.
Water supply	Bolmen Water Tunnel	Kronoberg/Scania, Sweden	82,000 m (50.952 mi)	1987	8 m^{2} cross section
Metro	Istanbul Metro (Line M11)	Istanbul, Turkey	69,110 m (42.943 mi)	2023–2025	Longest metro tunnel in Europe and longest tunnel in Turkey
Metro	Chengdu Metro Line 6	Chengdu, China	68,223 m (42.392 mi)	2020	
Hydroelectric	Neelum–Jhelum Hydropower Tunnel	Muzaffarabad, Azad Kashmir, Pakistan	68,000 m (42.253 mi)	2017	Part of the 969 MW Neelum–Jhelum Hydropower Plant
Wastewater	Tunel Emisor Oriente	Mexico City, Mexico	62,500 m (38.836 mi)	2019	7 m in diameter. Longest wastewater tunnel.
Metro	Wuhan Metro Line 12	Wuhan, China	59,900 m (37.220 mi)	2026	Longest metro/rapid transit circular line
Metro	Qingdao Metro Line 1	Qingdao, China	59,818 m (37.169 mi)	2020–2021	
Metro	Guangzhou Metro Line 18	Guangzhou, China	58,300 m (36.226 mi)	2021	
Metro	Guangzhou Metro Line 3	Guangzhou, China	57,930 m (35.996 mi) (Excl. branch)	2005–2018	
Metro	Moscow Metro Bolshaya Koltsevaya line	Moscow, Russia	57,538 m (35.752 mi)	2018–2023	Second longest metro/rapid transit circular line
Railway twin tube	Gotthard Base Tunnel	Central Swiss Alps, Switzerland	57,104 m (35.483 mi) and 57,017 m (35.429 mi)	2016	Longest conventional railway tunnel. It is also the world's longest transit tunnel by geodetic distance; 55.782 km (34.661 mi) between the two portals. Total 151.84 km (94.35 mi) of broken out tunnels through solid rocks. Part of the NRLA.
Metro	Beijing Subway Line 10	Beijing, China	57,024 m (35.433 mi)	2008–2013	
Metro	Beijing Subway Line 6	Beijing, China	55,500 m (34.486 mi)	2012–2025	
Railway single tube	Seikan Tunnel	Tsugaru Strait, Japan	53,850 m (33.461 mi)	1988	74 m^{2}; longest railway tunnel until 2016. Longest tunnel with an undersea section, running between Honshu and Hokkaido. Undersea section measures 23.3 kilometres (14.5 mi).
Water supply	Želivka Water Tunnel	Central Bohemian Region, Czech Republic	51,970 m (32.293 mi)	1972	9–12 m^{2}
Metro	Seoul Subway: Line 5	Seoul, South Korea	51,700 m (32.125 mi) (longest branch)	1995–2021	Longest metro/rapid transit tunnel until Guangzhou Metro Line 3 extension opened in 2010, crosses west to east under the Seoul Capital Area.
Wastewater	Rothschönberger Stolln	Freiberg Mining Field, Germany	50,900 m (31.628 mi)	1844–1882	6 m^{2} cross section, longest tunnel until 1945. Part of a UNESCO World Heritage Site.
Railway twin tube	Channel Tunnel	English Channel, United Kingdom/France	50,450 m (31.348 mi)	1994	Second longest railway tunnel until 2016. Longest underwater section, longest international tunnel (2×45 m^{2} + 1×18 m^{2}), running between Folkestone, Kent, and Coquelles, Pas-de-Calais.
Railway single tube	Yulhyeon Tunnel	Seoul Capital Area, South Korea	50,300 m (31.255 mi)	2016	107 m^{2}, part of the Suseo high-speed railway.
Wastewater	Tunel Emisor Central	Mexico City, Mexico	49,742 m (30.908 mi)	1975	6.5 m in diameter
Water supply	River Arpa – Lake Sevan tunnel	Armenia (at the time of construction Soviet Union)	48,358 m (30.048 mi)	1981	Longest tunnel built to restore ecological balance. Transfers water from the Arpa to Lake Sevan to recover its level.
Water supply	Pahang – Selangor Raw Water Transfer Project	Pahang & Selangor, Malaysia	44,600 m (27.713 mi)	2014	5.2 m in diameter
Metro	Wuhan Metro Line 2	Wuhan, China	44,347 m (27.556 mi)	2012–2019	
Metro	Lyublinsko-Dmitrovskaya Line (Zyablikovo – Fiztekh)	Moscow Metro, Russia (construction started at the time of Soviet Union)	44,300 m (27.527 mi)	1995–2023	
Metro	Shanghai Subway: Line 7	Shanghai, China	44,200 m (27.465 mi)	2009–2010	
Water supply	#1 Tunnel, Yellow River Diversion to Shanxi North Line	Shanxi, China	43,670 m (27.135 mi)	2011	See South–North Water Transfer Project
Water supply	#7 Tunnel, Yellow River Diversion to Shanxi South Line	Shanxi, China	43,500 m (27.030 mi)	2002	See South–North Water Transfer Project
Metro	Beijing Subway Line 8	Beijing, China	42,600 m (26.470 mi)	2012–2021	
Metro	Shanghai Metro Line 15	Shanghai, China	42,300 m (26.284 mi)	2021	
Metro	Chengdu Metro Line 5	Chengdu, China	42,300 m (26.284 mi)	2019	
Metro	Beijing Subway Line 14	Beijing, China	42,000 m (26.098 mi)	2015–2021	
Metro	Tianjin Metro Line 6	Tianjin, China	42,000 m (26.098 mi)	2016–2021	
Metro	Downtown line	MRT, Singapore	41,900 m (26.035 mi)	2013–2017	Longest rapid transit line in Southeast Asia
Metro	Nanjing Metro Line 3	Nanjing, China	41,567 m (25.829 mi)	2011–2015	From Xinghuolu station to Mozhoudonglu station.
Metro	Suzhou Metro: Line 4	Suzhou, China	41,500 m (25.787 mi)	2017	
Metro	Serpukhovsko-Timiryazevskaya Line (Altufyevo – Bulvar Dmitriya Donskogo)	Moscow Metro, Russia (construction started at the time of Soviet Union)	41,470 m (25.768 mi)	1983–2002	
Metro	Madrid Metro: Line 12 (MetroSur)	Madrid, Spain	40,900 m (25.414 mi)	1999–2003	
Metro	Tocho-mae – Shiodome – Hikarigaoka (Toei Oedo Line)	Tokyo, Japan	40,700 m (25.290 mi)	1991–2000	Tokyo Metropolitan Bureau of Transportation
Hydroelectric	Kárahnjúkar Hydropower Plant	Fljótsdalshreppur, Iceland	39,700 m (24.668 mi)	2003–2007	7.2–7.6 meters in diameter (45 m^{2} cross section). Part of a wider complex of tunnels that are 72 kilometers in length combined.
Water supply	Quabbin Aqueduct	Massachusetts, United States	39,600 m (24.606 mi)	1933	
Metro	Chengdu Metro Line 4	Chengdu, China	39,300 m (24.420 mi)	2015–2017	
Metro	Chengdu Metro Line 7	Chengdu, China	38,600 m (23.985 mi)	2017	
Metro	Seoul Subway: Line 3 (Apgujeong–Ogeum)	Seoul, South Korea	38,200 m (23.736 mi)	1985–2010	
Metro	Kaluzhsko-Rizhskaya Line (Novoyasenevskaya – Medvedkovo)	Moscow Metro, Russia (at the time of construction Soviet Union)	37,800 m (23.488 mi)	1958–1990	Longest railway tunnel 1978–1984 and from November 1987 until March 1988; longest metro/rapid transit tunnel in 1990–1995.
Metro	Shenzhen Subway: Luobao Line	Shenzhen, China	37,497 m (23.300 mi)	2009–2011	
Metro	Chengdu Metro Line 1	Chengdu, China	37,470 m (23.283 mi) (Excl. branch)	2010–2018	
Water supply	Harold D. Roberts Tunnel	Colorado, United States	37,464 m (23.279 mi)	1962	Diverts water from the Colorado River watershed to the South Platte River watershed for use in the Denver metropolitan area. Flows across Continental Divide. 4,465 feet (1,361 m) below the surface at its deepest point.
Metro	Shenzhen Subway: Shekou Line	Shenzhen, China	36,146 m (22.460 mi)	2010–2011	
Water supply	Dawushan Tunnel, Niulan River Diversion to Dianchi	Yunnan, China	36,137 m (22.454 mi)	2013	
Metro	Circle line	MRT, Singapore	35,700 m (22.183 mi)	2009–2012	
Metro	Busan Metro: Line 2 (Dongwon–Jangsan)	Busan, South Korea	35,500 m (22.059 mi)	1999–2009	
Railway	Songshan Lake Tunnel	Dongguan, China	35,391 m (21.991 mi)	2016	Dongguan–Huizhou intercity railway, longest railway tunnel in China
Metro	Seoul Subway: Line 6	Seoul, South Korea	35,100 m (21.810 mi)	2001	
Metro	Seoul Subway: Line 7 (Cheongdam–Bupyeong-gu Office)	Seoul, Incheon, Bucheon and Gwangmyeong in South Korea	35,100 m (21.810 mi)	2000–2012	
Metro	Tianjin Metro: Line 5	Tianjin, China	34,800 m (21.624 mi)	2018–2021	
Railway single track	Lötschberg Base Tunnel	Bernese Alps, Switzerland	34,577 m (21.485 mi)	2007	Longest land railway tunnel until Gotthard Base Tunnel was opened; two single track tubes along 12 km, only single track along 22 km. Part of the NRLA.
Metro	Istanbul Metro (Line M4)	Istanbul, Turkey	34,050 m (21.158 mi)	2012	
Water supply	Tyne-Tees Tunnel	England, United Kingdom	34,000 m (21.127 mi)	1983 (and earlier)	Northumbrian water supply tunnel
Metro	Guangzhou Metro: Line 8	Guangzhou, China	33,900 m (21.064 mi)	2010–2020	
Metro	Mumbai Metro: Line 3 (Aqua Line)	Mumbai, India	33,500 m (20.816 mi)	2021	
Metro	Madrid Metro: Line 7	Madrid, Spain	32,919 m (20.455 mi)	1974–2007	
Railway twin tube	Koralm Tunnel	Koralpe, Austria	32,900 m (20.443 mi)	2025	Part of the Koralm Railway; boring of main tunnel started at the west portal in May 2010.
Railway twin tube	New Guanjiao Tunnel	Qinghai, China	32,645 m (20.285 mi)	2014	Longest tunnel on the upgraded dual-track Xining–Golmud section of Qinghai–Tibet Railway and the longest railway tunnel in China until 2016. It is 3323.58–3380.97 meters above sea level.
Metro	Meijo Line – Meikō Line	Nagoya Municipal Subway, Japan	32,400 m (20.132 mi)	1965–2004	
Metro	Guangzhou Metro: Line 2	Guangzhou, China	32,000 m (19.884 mi)	2010	
Metro	Rathaus Spandau–Rudow (U7)	Berlin U-Bahn, Germany	31,800 m (19.760 mi)	1924–1984	While the line was extended to Rudow after World War II, the line was originally 17.6 km in length and ended at Mehringdamm when it opened in 1924.
Water supply	Gerede Water Transmission Tunnel	Ankara, Turkey	31,592 m (19.630 mi)	2019	5.2 m in diameter
Metro	Seoul Subway: Bundang Line (Seoul Forest–Jukjeon)	Seoul, Seongnam and Yongin in South Korea	31,400 m (19.511 mi)	1994–2012	
Metro	Daegu Metro: Line 2	Daegu and Gyeongsan in South Korea	31,400 m (19.511 mi)	2005–2012	
Wastewater	Milwaukee Metropolitan Sewerage District Deep Tunnel Phase 1	Milwaukee County, Wisconsin, United States	31,221 m (19.400 mi)	1993	405 million gallons of combined sewage storage designed to prevent sewage overflow into Lake Michigan. The largest of three phases, totalling 521 million gallons of storage.
Metro	Beijing Subway: Line 1	Beijing, China	31,040 m (19.287 mi)	1971–2000	
Metro	Bucharest Metro: Line M1	Bucharest, Romania	31,010 m (19.269 mi)	1979–1992	8,670 m, shared with M3 line. Nevertheless still one continuous tunnel.
Metro	Istanbul Metro (Line M5)	Istanbul, Turkey	30,900 m (19.200 mi)	2017–2018	
Metro	Côte-Vertu – Montmorency (Line 2 Orange)	Montreal Metro, Canada	30,798 m (19.137 mi)	1966–2007	
Metro	Shanghai Subway: Line 2	Shanghai, China	30,187 m (18.757 mi)	2000	
Metro	Parnas – Kupchino (line 2)	Saint Petersburg Metro, Russia (construction started at the time of Soviet Union)	30,100 m (18.703 mi)	1961–2006	
Metro	Guangzhou Metro: Line 5	Guangzhou, China	29,900 m (18.579 mi)	2009	
Water supply	Shandaken Tunnel	Catskill Mountains, New York, United States	29,780 m (18.504 mi)	1924	
Metro	Shanghai Subway: Line 8	Shanghai, China	29,650 m (18.424 mi)	2007–2009	
Metro	Prospekt Veteranov – Devyatkino (line 1)	Saint Petersburg Metro, Russia (at the time of construction Soviet Union)	29,600 m (18.393 mi)	1955–1978	
Metro	Shanghai Subway: Line 10	Shanghai, China	29,600 m (18.393 mi)	2010	
Water supply	Evinos – Mornos Tunnel	Aetolia-Acarnania, Greece	29,400 m (18.268 mi)	1995	
Metro	Chengdu Metro Line 2	Chengdu, China	29,000 m (18.020 mi)	2012–2013	Only includes phases 1 and 2
Water supply	Hultman Aqueduct	Eastern Massachusetts, United States	28,640 m (17.796 mi)	1939	11.5 ft (3.5 m) to 14 ft (4.3 m) diameter (15 m^{2} cross section); offline for rehabilitation
Metro	Sydney Metro City	Sydney, New South Wales, Australia	28,500 m (17.709 mi)	2019–2024	The line runs from Sydenham to Chatswood and extends to the 13 km Epping to Chatswood rail link. It forms part of the wider Sydney Metro project.
Railway twin tube	Guadarrama Tunnel	Sierra de Guadarrama, Spain	28,377 m (17.633 mi)	2007	
Water supply	MetroWest Water Supply Tunnel	Eastern Massachusetts, United States	28,300 m (17.585 mi)	2003	14 ft (4.3 m) diameter (15 m^{2} cross section)
Railway twin tube	West Qinling Tunnel	Gansu, China	28,236 m (17.545 mi)	2016	Chongqing–Lanzhou railway
Metro	Taipei Metro: Blue Line	Taipei, Taiwan	28,200 m (17.523 mi)	1999–2015	
Metro	Beijing Subway: Line 4	Beijing, China	28,165 m (17.501 mi)	2009–2010	
Metro	Seoul Subway: Line 9 (Gimpo Airport–Sports Complex)	Seoul, South Korea	28,100 m (17.461 mi)	2009–2015	
Railway single tube	Taihang Tunnel	Taihang Mountains, China	27,848 m (17.304 mi)	2007	On Shijiazhuang–Taiyuan high-speed railway
Metro	Morden–East Finchley (Northern line)	London Underground, England, United Kingdom	27,800 m (17.274 mi)	1890–1940	Longest railway tunnel in UK; the extension to 27,800 m and to East Finchley did not happen until 1924.
Metro	Shenyang Subway: Line 1	Shenyang, China	27,800 m (17.274 mi)	2010	
Water supply	Melamchi Water Tunnel	Melamchi to Kathmandu, Nepal	27,000 m (16.777 mi)	2021	See Melamchi Water Supply Project
Metro	Seoul Subway: Incheon Line 1 (Bakchon–International Business District)	Incheon, South Korea	27,000 m (16.777 mi)	1999–2009	
Metro	Dainichi–Nagahara (Tanimachi Line)	Osaka Metro, Japan	26,900 m (16.715 mi)	1967–1983	
Particle accelerator	LEP Tunnel	CERN, Switzerland/France	26,659 m (16.565 mi)	1988 (breakthrough)	11.3–15.9 m^{2} circular ring, now used by Large Hadron Collider
Railway single tube	Hakkōda Tunnel (Tōhoku Shinkansen)	Hakkōda Mountains, Japan	26,455 m (16.438 mi)	2010	64–74 m^{2}
Water supply	Şanlıurfa Irrigation Tunnels	Turkey	26,400 m (16.404 mi)	2005	
Metro	Shanghai Subway: Line 9	Shanghai, China	26,263 m (16.319 mi)	2007–2010	
Hydroelectric	Gilgel Gibe II Power Station headrace tunnel	Ethiopia	26,000 m (16.156 mi)	2005–2009	Tunnel partially collapsed, was repaired in 2010.
Water supply	#5 Tunnel, Yellow River Diversion to Shanxi South Line	Shanxi, China	26,000 m (16.156 mi)	2002	See South–North Water Transfer Project
Metro	Daegu Metro: Line 1	Daegu, South Korea	25,900 m (16.094 mi)	1997–2002	
Metro	MRT Blue Line	Bangkok, Thailand	25,800 m (16.031 mi)	2004	Second phase opened in September 2019
Railway single tube	Iwate-Ichinohe Tunnel	Ōu Mountains, Japan	25,810 m (16.038 mi)	2002	Part of the Tōhoku Shinkansen
Water supply	Sudbury Aqueduct	Eastern Massachusetts, United States	25,750 m (16.000 mi)	1878	Emergency backup use
Metro	Suzhou Metro: Line 1	Suzhou, China	25,739 m (15.993 mi)	2007–2011	
Metro	Line 3 (Athens Metro)	Athens, Greece	25,200 m (15.659 mi)	1992–2022	Line 3 is actually 46.5 km long, but only 25.2 km of it are underground.
Metro	Helsinki metro (Kivenlahti–Sörnäinen)	Espoo and Helsinki, Finland	25,200 m (15.659 mi)	1982–2022	
Metro	Taipei Metro: Orange Line (Huilong – Nanshijiao)	Taipei, Taiwan	25,100 m (15.596 mi) (Excl. branch)	1998–2013	
Railway twin tube	Musil Tunnel	Wonju–Jecheon (Jungang Line), South Korea	25,080 m (15.584 mi)	2021	
Waste-water	Thames Tideway Tunnel	London, England, United Kingdom	25,000 m (15.534 mi)	2025	7.2 m in diameter
Railway twin tube	Pajares Base Tunnel	Asturias/León, Spain	24,667 m (15.327 mi)	2023	
Road	Lærdal Tunnel	Lærdal–Aurland, Norway	24,510 m (15.230 mi)	2000	World's longest road tunnel
Metro	Yellow Line (Delhi Metro): Guru Tegh Bahadur Nagar – Saket	Delhi, India	24,000 m (14.913 mi)	2004–2010	Longest tunnel in India
Metro	Madrid Metro: Line 1	Madrid, Spain	23,876 m (14.836 mi)	1919–2007	
Railway	Lainzer/Wienerwaldtunnel	west of Vienna, Austria	23,844 m (14.816 mi)	2012	Breakthrough 2007
Wastewater	Harbour Area Treatment Scheme (HATS) Stage 1	Hong Kong, China (construction started in British Hong Kong)	23,600 m (14.664 mi)	2001	
Water supply	Eucumbene-Snowy Tunnel	New South Wales, Australia	23,500 m (14.602 mi)	1965	Part of the 145 km tunnel network of the Snowy Mountains Scheme
Railway	South Lüliangshan Tunnel	Shanxi, China	23,473 m (14.585 mi)	2014	2 tubes, part of Shanxi–Henan–Shandong railway
Metro	Madrid Metro: Line 6	Madrid, Spain	23,472 m (14.585 mi)	1979–2007	
Metro	Angrignon – Honoré-Beaugrand (Line 1 Green)	Montreal Metro, Canada	23,262 m (14.454 mi)	1966–2007	
Metro	Warsaw Metro Line 1: Kabaty – Młociny	Warsaw, Poland	23,100 m (14.354 mi)	1983–2008	
Metro	Beijing Subway: Line 2	Beijing, China	23,100 m (14.354 mi)	1969–1987	
Hydroelectric	Xinma Hydroelectric Power Station Water Tunnel	Sichuan, China	22,975 m (14.276 mi)	2009	
Railway	Iiyama Tunnel	Iiyama, Japan	22,225 m (13.810 mi)	2015	Part of the Hokuriku Shinkansen
Railway	Daishimizu Tunnel	Mount Tanigawa, Japan	22,221 m (13.807 mi)	1982	Longest railway tunnel until Seikan Tunnel was opened.
Water supply	Eucumbene-Tumut Tunnel	New South Wales, Australia	22,200 m (13.794 mi)	1959	Part of the 145 km tunnel network of the Snowy Mountains Scheme
Road twin tube	Tianshan Shengli Tunnel	Xinjiang, China	22,130 m (13.751 mi)	2025	Part of the Ürümqi–Yuli Expressway, the tunnel has been completed and opened to traffic on 26 December 2025. Construction started in 2020. Bypassing Sengli Daban mountain pass which sits up at 4091 meters above the sea level, it is the longest road tunnel in the world at an altitude of over 4 km. Tunelling completed in December 2024.
Road	WestConnex	Sydney, New South Wales, Australia	22,000 m (13.670 mi)	2023 (2019–2020 partial completion)	
Railway	Daegwallyeong Tunnel	Pyeongchang–Gangneung (Gyeonggang Line), South Korea	21,755 m (13.518 mi)	2017	
Water supply	Vorotan–Arpa Tunnel	Armenia (construction started at the time of Soviet Union)	21,652 m (13.454 mi)	2004	
Water supply & hydroelectric	Alva B. Adams Tunnel	Colorado, United States	21,100 m (13.111 mi)	1947 (opened)	
Particle accelerator (incomplete)	UNK proton accelerator	Protvino, Russia (construction started at the time of Soviet Union)	21,000 m (13.049 mi)	1994 (breakthrough)	Construction stopped after finishing of main circle tunnel, future is unclear
Metro	Guangfo Metro	Foshan, China	20,900 m (12.987 mi)	2010	
Railway twin tube	Luliangshan Tunnel	Shanxi, China	20,785 m (12.915 mi)	2011	2 tubes: left tube is 20,785 meters, right tube is 20,738 meters
Metro	Shanghai Subway: Line 4	Shanghai, China	20,740 m (12.887 mi)	2005–2007	
Metro	Barcelona Metro: Line 1	Barcelona, Spain	20,700 m (12.862 mi)	1926–1992	
Hydroelectric	Ward Tunnel	California, United States	20,610 m (12.806 mi)	1920–1925	Part of the Big Creek Hydroelectric Project of the Southern California Edison Company. Excavated through solid granite.
Metro	Busan Metro: Line 1 (Hadan-Busan Nat'l Univ. of Education)	Busan, South Korea	20,600 m (12.800 mi)	1985–1994	
Metro	Xian Subway: Line 2	Xi'an, China	20,500 m (12.738 mi)	2011	
Metro	Daejeon Metro: Line 1	Daejeon, South Korea	20,470 m (12.719 mi)	2006–2007	
Metro	Nanjing Metro Line 2	Nanjing, China	20,380 m (12.664 mi)	2010	
Metro	Shanghai Subway: Line 6	Shanghai, China	20,336 m (12.636 mi)	2007	
Railway	Geumjeong Tunnel	Busan, South Korea	20,323 m (12.628 mi)	2010	Gyeongbu high-speed railway
Metro	Baku Metro (Red Line)	Baku, Azerbaijan	20,100 m (12.490 mi)	1967–2002	
Railway twin tube	Wushaoling Tunnel	Wuwei, China	20,060 m (12.465 mi)	2006–2007	2 tubes: left tube is 20,060 meters, right tube is 20,050 meters
Water supply	Olmos Transandino Project	Guabal, Peru	20,000 m (12.427 mi)	2011	
Electric power transmission tunnel	The London Connection	London, England, United Kingdom	20,000 m (12.427 mi)	2005	National Grid plc, 3-metre diameter, 400 kilovolt circuit
Railway twin tube	Simplon Tunnel	Lepontine Alps, Switzerland/Italy	19,803 m (12.305 mi)	1906	Parallel tunnel was opened in 1922 (19,824 m long); longest transit tunnel until Daishimizu Tunnel was opened. Part of the NRLA.
Hydroelectric	Mantaro Hydroelectricity Project Tunnel	Colcabamba, Peru	19,800 m (12.303 mi)	1973	
Railway	Shin Hokuriku Tunnel	Fukui Prefecture, Japan	19,760 m (12.278 mi)	2024	Part of the Hokuriku Shinkansen
Railway	Follo Line	Oslo, Norway	19,500 m (12.117 mi)	2022	Groundbreaking in 2014
Metro	Koltsevaya Line (Circle Line)	Moscow Metro, Russia (at the time of construction Soviet Union)	19,400 m (12.055 mi)	1950–1954	
Hydroelectric	Futang Hydroelectric Power Station Water Tunnel	Sichuan, China	19,319 m (12.004 mi)	2004	
Metro	Seoul Subway: Bundang Line (Suwon station–Jukjeon station)	Yongin and Suwon in South Korea	19,300 m (11.992 mi)	2007–2013	
Railway single tube	Qamchiq Tunnel	Angren–Pap railway, Uzbekistan	19,200 m (11.930 mi)	2016	Longest non-metro railway tunnel in ex-USSR
Metro	North East line	MRT, Singapore	19,200 m (11.930 mi)	2003–2011	World's first fully automated and driverless underground rapid transit line
Metro	Suzhou Metro: Line 2	Suzhou, China	19,146 m (11.897 mi)	2009–2012	
Metro	Maskoŭskaja Line	Minsk Metro, Belarus (construction started at the time of Soviet Union)	19,100 m (11.868 mi)	1984–2014	
Railway single track	Vereina	Silvretta, Switzerland	19,058 m (11.842 mi)	1999	Single track with passing loops, metre gauge
Metro	Seoul Subway: Line 4 (Ssangmun–Ichon)	Seoul, South Korea	19,000 m (11.806 mi)	1980	
Wastewater	Harbour Area Treatment Scheme (HATS) Stage 2	Hong Kong, China	18,800 m (11.682 mi)	2015	
Railway	Shin-Kanmon Tunnel	Kanmon Straits, Japan	18,713 m (11.628 mi)	1975	Part of the San'yō Shinkansen
Hydroelectric	Shiziping Hydroelectric Power Station Water Tunnel	Sichuan, China	18,712 m (11.627 mi)	2010	
Railway single tube	Vaglia	Bologna – Firenze, Italy	18,711 m (11.626 mi)	2009	Bologna–Florence high-speed railway
Hydroelectric	Baoxing Hydroelectric Power Station Water Tunnel	Sichuan, China	18,676 m (11.605 mi)	2007	
Railway single tube	Apennine Base Tunnel	Tuscan-Emilian Apennines, Italy	18,507 m (11.500 mi)	1934	
Metro	Obolonsko–Teremkivska line	Kyiv Metro, Ukraine (construction started at the time of Soviet Union)	18,480 m (11.483 mi)	1976–2013	
Metro	Istanbul Metro (Line M3)	Istanbul, Turkey	18,460 m (11.471 mi)	2013–2022	
Railway twin tube	Qinling Tunnel I-II	Qin Mountains, China	18,460 m (11.471 mi)	2000	2 tubes: left tube is 18,460 meters, right tube is 18,456 meters
Hydroelectric	Tatev Hydroelectric Power Station Water Tunnel	Armenia (at the time of construction Soviet Union)	18,400 m (11.433 mi)	1970	
Road twin tube	Yamate Tunnel	Tokyo, Japan	18,200 m (11.309 mi)	2015	
Railway	South Taihangshan Tunnel	Shanxi, China	18,125 m (11.262 mi)	2014	2 tubes, part of Shanxi–Henan–Shandong railway
Metro	Shanghai Subway: Line 1	Shanghai, China	18,110 m (11.253 mi)	1995	
Metro	Avtozavodskaya Line	Minsk Metro, Belarus (construction started at the time of Soviet Union)	18,100 m (11.247 mi)	1990–2005	
Road twin tube	Zhongnanshan Tunnel	Shaanxi, China	18,040 m (11.210 mi)	2007	The longest road tunnel in China
Metro	Line 2 (Athens Metro)	Athens, Greece	17,900 m (11.123 mi)	1991–2013	
Metro	Beijing Subway: Line 5	Beijing, China	17,825 m (11.076 mi)	2007	
Hydroelectric	Shuakhevi headrace and pressure tunnel	(Georgia (country)) Shuakhevi, Adjara, Georgia	17,800 m (11.060 mi)	2013–2017	
Metro	Ankara Metro (AKM-Koru)	Ankara, Turkey	19,660 m (12.216 mi)	1997–2014	M1 line is tunnel in Kızılay between AKM, M2 line is completely underground.
Road	Jingpingshan	Sichuan, China	17,500 m (10.874 mi)	2008	The deepest transportation tunnel in China
Metro	Shenzhen Subway: Longgang Line	Shenzhen, China	17,333 m (10.770 mi)	2010–2011	
Metro	Kholodnohirsko–Zavodska Line	Kharkiv Metro, Ukraine (at the time of construction Soviet Union)	17,300 m (10.750 mi)	1975–1978	
Metro	Seoul Subway: Shinbundang Line	Seoul and Seongnam in South Korea	17,300 m (10.750 mi)	2011	
Water supply	Mavi Tünel (Blue Tunnel)	Konya, Turkey	17,034 m (10.584 mi)	2012	Breakthrough in 2007
Road	Gotthard Road Tunnel	Lepontine Alps, Switzerland	16,918 m (10.512 mi)	1980	
Metro	İzmir Metro Line M1	İzmir, Turkey	16,900 m (10.501 mi)	2000–2023	M1 Line is 27 km long, but only 19.8 km of it is underground in two noncontinuous sections. The shorter underground section is 2.9 km long.
Metro	Guangzhou Metro: Line 4	Guangzhou, China	16,790 m (10.433 mi)	2005	
Metro	Barcelona Metro: Line 4	Barcelona, Spain	16,700 m (10.377 mi)	1929–1999	
Metro	Seoul Subway: Line 2 (Jamsil–Sillim)	Seoul, South Korea	16,700 m (10.377 mi)	1980–1984	
Metro	Barcelona Metro: Line 3	Barcelona, Spain	16,600 m (10.315 mi)	1924–2001	
Metro	Barcelona Metro: Line 5	Barcelona, Spain	16,600 m (10.315 mi)	1959–1983	
Water supply	Murrumbidgee-Eucumbene Tunnel	New South Wales, Australia	16,600 m (10.315 mi)	1961	Part of the 145 km tunnel network of the Snowy Mountains Scheme
Metro	Istanbul Metro (Line M2)	Istanbul, Turkey	16,500 m (10.253 mi)	2000–2009	
Metro	Beijing Subway: Line 9	Beijing, China	16,500 m (10.253 mi)	2011–2012	
Hydroelectric	Jinkang Hydroelectric Power Station Water Tunnel	Sichuan, China	16,490 m (10.246 mi)	2006	
Metro	Madrid Metro: Line 8	Madrid, Spain	16,467 m (10.232 mi)	1998–2007	
Metro	Guangzhou Metro: Line 1	Guangzhou, China	16,449 m (10.221 mi)	1997	
Metro	Madrid Metro: Line 3	Madrid, Spain	16,424 m (10.205 mi)	1939–2007	
Railway	Rokkō Tunnel	Mount Rokkō, Japan	16,250 m (10.097 mi)	1972	Part of the San'yō Shinkansen
Railway	Solan Tunnel	Taebaek, Gangwon-do, South Korea	16,240 m (10.091 mi)	2012	Taebaek Line, includes a spiral
Hydroelectric twin tube	Kemano T1 and T2	Kemano, Canada	16,000 m (9.942 mi)	1954; 2022	T1 was completed in 1954 and T2 was completed in May, 2022, both are in operation.
Metro	Seoul Subway: Line 7 (Suraksan–Konkuk University)	Seoul, South Korea	16,000 m (9.942 mi)	1996	
Railway	Münsterertunnel	Tyrol, Austria	15,990 m (9.936 mi)	2012	
Railway	Xiangshan Tunnel 象山隧道	Fujian, China	15,917 m (9.890 mi)	2012	2 tubes, part of Longyan–Xiamen Railway
Railway	Terfenertunnel	Tyrol, Austria	15,840 m (9.843 mi)	2012	
Former railway	Henderson Tunnel	Front Range, United States	15,800 m (9.818 mi)	1976	Narrow gauge railway, replaced by a conveyor belt in 1999. Only one portal (served an underground mine)
Metro	Istanbul Metro (Line M9)	Istanbul, Turkey	15,800 m (9.818 mi)	2013–2024	
Water supply	Pandaoling Tunnel, Datong River Diversion to Shaanxi Project	Shaanxi, China	15,723 m (9.770 mi)	1994	
Metro	Copenhagen Metro: City Circle Line	Denmark	15,500 m (9.631 mi)	2019	Longest railway tunnel in Denmark and Scandinavia
Metro	Budapest Metro: Line 3	Hungary	15,500 m (9.631 mi)	1976–1990	Line 3 is actually 17.39 km long, but only 15.5 km of it is underground.
Railway single track	Furka Base	Urner Alps, Switzerland	15,442 m (9.595 mi)	1982	Single track with passing loops, metre gauge
Railway twin tube	Ceneri Base Tunnel	Lepontine Alps, Switzerland	15,400 m (9.569 mi)	2020	Part of the NRLA
Metro	Seoul Subway: Line 3 (Gupabal–Geumho)	Seoul, South Korea	15,400 m (9.569 mi)	1985	
Metro	Tianjin Subway: Line 1	Tianjin, China	15,378 m (9.555 mi)	1976–2006	
Railway	Haruna Tunnel	Gunma Prefecture, Japan	15,350 m (9.538 mi)	1982	Part of the Jōetsu Shinkansen
Railway single track	Severomuysky Tunnel	Severomuysky Range, Russia (construction started at the time of Soviet Union)	15,343 m (9.534 mi)	2003	
Wastewater	Deer Island Outfall Tunnel	Deer Island, Boston, Massachusetts, United States	15,290 m (9.501 mi)	2000	24 ft (7.3 m) diameter (42 m^{2} cross section); discharges treated effluent into Atlantic Ocean
Railway single tube	Firenzuola	Bologna – Firenze, Italy	15,285 m (9.498 mi)	2009	Bologna–Florence high-speed railway
Hydroelectric	Inguri Hydroelectric Power Station Water Tunnel	(Georgia (country)) Georgia (at the time of construction Soviet Union)	15,279 m (9.494 mi)	1978	
Metro	Shanghai Subway: Line 2	Shanghai, China	15,274 m (9.491 mi)	2000	Between Zhanjianggaoke station and Lingkong Station
Water supply	Jinquidi Tunnel, Niulan River Diversion to Dianchi	Yunnan, China	15,257 m (9.480 mi)	2013	
Hydroelectric	Baotan Hydroelectric Power Station Water Tunnel	Guangxi, China	15,200 m (9.445 mi)	2010	
Railway	Gorigamine Tunnel	Nagano Prefecture, Japan	15,175 m (9.429 mi)	1997	Part of the Hokuriku Shinkansen
Hydroelectric	Xuecheng Hydroelectric Power Station Water Tunnel	Sichuan, China	15,174 m (9.429 mi)	2007	
Railway single track	Monte Santomarco	Paola – Cosenza, Italy	15,040 m (9.345 mi)	1987	
Railway single tube	Gotthard Rail Tunnel	Lepontine Alps, Switzerland	15,003 m (9.322 mi)	1882	Longest transit tunnel until Simplon Tunnel was opened.
Metro	Gwangju Metro: Line 1 (Sotae station–Dosan station)	Gwangju, South Korea	15,000 m (9.321 mi)	2004	
Railway	Nakayama Tunnel	Gunma Prefecture, Japan	14,857 m (9.232 mi)	1982	Part of the Jōetsu Shinkansen
Water supply	Dangara Irrigation Tunnel	Nurek, Tajikistan (at the time of construction Soviet Union)	14,800 m (9.196 mi)	1987	
Railway	Cuajone-El Sargento	Ilo-Toquepala / Cuajone Industrial Railroad – Southern Peru Copper Corporation, Peru	14,724 m (9.149 mi)	1975	
Railway single tube	Mount Macdonald Tunnel	Rogers Pass, Glacier National Park, Canada	14,723 m (9.148 mi)	1989	
Railway (maglev)	Misaka Sasago Tunnel	Yamanashi, Japan	14,613 m (9.080 mi)	1996	Part of the Chuo Shinkansen (Maglev). Already used as Yamanashi Test Track since 1996.
Railway single tube	Lötschberg Tunnel	Bernese Alps, Switzerland	14,612 m (9.079 mi)	1913	
Water supply	Caoe River Diversion Project	Zhejiang, China	14,600 m (9.072 mi)	2011	
Railway single tube	Romerike Tunnel	Oslo – Lillestrøm, Norway	14,580 m (9.060 mi)	1999	
Railway	Fajiushan Tunnel	Shanxi, China	14,573 m (9.055 mi)	2014	Part of Shanxi–Henan–Shandong railway
Water supply	Snowy-Geehi Tunnel	New South Wales, Australia	14,500 m (9.010 mi)	1966	Part of the 145 km tunnel network of the Snowy Mountains Scheme
Metro	Baku Metro (Green Line)	Baku Azerbaijan	14,500 m (9.010 mi)	1976–2011	
Metro	Seoul Subway: Line 4 (Isu–Beomgye)	Seoul, Gwacheon and Anyang in South Korea	14,500 m (9.010 mi)	1980–1994	
Road twin tube	Zigana Tunnel	Torul–Maçka, Turkey	14,481 m (8.998 mi)	2023	Longest road tunnel in Turkey
Hydroelectric	Jisha Hydroelectric Power Station Water Tunnel	Yunnan, China	14,467 m (8.989 mi)	2007	
Road twin tube	Ryfylke Tunnel	Stavanger–Strand, Norway	14,400 m (8.948 mi)	2019	Longest underwater road tunnel in the world
Water supply	#6 Tunnel, Yellow River Diversion to Shanxi South Line	Shanxi, China	14,400 m (8.948 mi)	2002	See South–North Water Transfer Project
Water supply	Ala Mountain Pass Water Supply Project	Xinjiang, China	14,346 m (8.914 mi)	2010	
Road twin tube	Ovit Tunnel	Erzurum Province–Rize Province, Turkey	14,346 m (8.914 mi)	2018	
Metro	Stockholm Metro: Tunnelbana 3 (Blue Line) Kungsträdgården–Hjulsta	Stockholm, Sweden	14,300 m (8.886 mi)	1975–1977	
Railway single tube	Dayaoshan Tunnel	Nanling Mountains, China	14,294 m (8.882 mi)	1987	
Metro	Istanbul Metro (Line M8)	Istanbul, Turkey	14,270 m (8.867 mi)	2023	
Hydroelectric	Zaramag Hydroelectric Power Station Water Tunnel	Ardon River, North Ossetia, Russia	14,226 m (8.840 mi)	2015	
Water supply	Tooma-Tumut Tunnel	New South Wales, Australia	14,200 m (8.823 mi)	1961	Part of the 145 km tunnel network of the Snowy Mountains Scheme
Metro	Metro Lisbon – Blue (Seagull) Line	Lisbon, Portugal	14,000 m (8.699 mi)	1959–2007	
Metro	MTR – Island line (West of Heng Fa Chuen)	Hong Kong, China (construction started at the time of British Hong Kong)	14,000 m (8.699 mi)	1985–2014	
Road	Arlberg Road Tunnel	Arlberg, Austria	13,972 m (8.682 mi)	1978	
Water supply	Shanggongshan Tunnel, Zhangjiuhe Water Supply Project	Yunnan, China	13,941 m (8.663 mi)	2007	
Hydroelectric	Dayingshan #4 Hydroelectric Power Station Water Tunnel	Yunnan, China	13,932 m (8.657 mi)	2009	8.5 m in diameter (57 m^{2} cross section)
Railway	Hokuriku Tunnel	Fukui Prefecture, Japan	13,870 m (8.618 mi)	1962	Part of the Hokuriku Main Line
Railway single tube	Xiapu Tunnel	Fujian, China	13,838 m (8.599 mi)	2009	
Railway twin tube	Yesanguan Tunnel	Hubei, China	13,838 m (8.599 mi)	2010	Tube I: 13,838 meters, tube II: 13,796 meters
Hydroelectric	Centrala Hidroelectrică Lotru-Ciunget	Ciungetu, Romania	13,719 m (8.525 mi)	1972	5 m in diameter
Railway single tube	Fréjus (Mont Cenis)	Alps, France/Italy (construction started in the Kingdom of Sardinia)	13,657 m (8.486 mi)	1871	Longest transit tunnel until Gotthard Tunnel was opened.
Road twin tube	Xishan Tunnel	Shanxi, China	13,654 m (8.484 mi)	2012	Left tube: 13,654 meters, right tube: 13,570 meters
Railway single tube	North Tianshan Tunnel	Xinjiang, China	13,610 m (8.457 mi)	2009	
Railway	Marmaray	Istanbul, Turkey	13,600 m (8.451 mi)	2013	Built next to a fault zone, between two continents
Railway single track	Savio Rail Tunnel	Helsinki – Kerava, Finland	13,575 m (8.435 mi)	2008	
Metro	Busan Metro: Line 3 (Suyeong–Deokcheon)	Busan, South Korea	13,500 m (8.389 mi)	2005	
Railway twin tube	Shin Shimizu Tunnel	Mount Tanigawa, Japan	13,500 m (8.389 mi)	1967	Part of the Jōetsu Line
Road	Mount Erlang Tunnel	Sichuan, China	13,433 m (8.347 mi)	2018	Erlangshan extra-long tunnel part of Yakang Expressway
Railway single track	Hex River Tunnel	Hex River Pass, South Africa	13,400 m (8.326 mi)	1989	
Railway	Wonhyo Tunnel	Ulsan, South Korea	13,270 m (8.246 mi)	2010	Gyeongbu high-speed railway
Railway single tube	Dabieshan Tunnel	Hubei, China	13,256 m (8.237 mi)	2008	
Railway	Schlern Tunnel	South Tyrol, Italy	13,159 m (8.177 mi)	1993	
Railway single tube	Caponero-Capoverde	Genova – Ventimiglia, Italy	13,135 m (8.162 mi)	2001	Includes an underground station ("San Remo")
Road twin tube	Hongtiguan Tunnel	Shanxi, China	13,122 m (8.154 mi)	2013	Left tube: 13,122 meters, right tube: 13,098 meters
Metro	Barcelona Metro line 2	Barcelona, Spain	13,100 m (8.140 mi)	1985–1997	
Railway	Aki Tunnel	Hiroshima Prefecture, Japan	13,030 m (8.096 mi)	1975	Part of the San'yō Shinkansen
	Many more tunnels exist that are shorter than 13,000 metres (8 mi)				

== World's longest tunnels (under construction) ==
Type	Name	Location	Length	Year	Comment
Water supply	Kashuang Water Tunnel	Xinjiang, China	280,000 m (173.984 mi)	(?)	Water transfer from the snow melt of Altai Mountains to the arid region of Xinjiang
Water supply	New York City Water Tunnel No. 3	New York State, United States	96,560 m (60.000 mi)	2032	More water supply for New York City. Partially in use.
Metro	Paris Métro Line 15	Paris/Île-de-France, France	75,000 m (46.603 mi)	2025–2030	Circular line
Water supply	Xianglushan Tunnel	Yunnan, China	62,596 m (38.895 mi)	2026	Longest tunnel of the Central Yunnan Water Diversion Project
Railway twin tube	Mont d'Ambin Base Tunnel	Cottian Alps, France/Italy	57,500 m (35.729 mi)	2033	Part of the Lyon–Turin high-speed railway. Reconnaissance tunnels under construction since 2002; construction of main tunnel started in 2016.
Railway twin tube	Brenner Base Tunnel	Stubai Alps, Austria/Italy	55,000 m (34.175 mi)	2032	Construction started in March 2015. Together with the already constructed Inntal Tunnel it will form the world's longest continuous railway tunnel with 64 km.
Metro	Thomson–East Coast Line	MRT, Singapore	43,000 m (26.719 mi)	2026	Excluding planned extension
Railway	Yigong tunnel	Tibet, China	42,500 m (26.408 mi)	2030	Part of the Sichuan–Tibet railway. Construction started in November 2020.
Metro	Baku Metro Green line	Baku, Azerbaijan	41,800 m (25.973 mi)	2040	Circular line
Metro	Athens Metro Line 4	Athens, Greece	38,200 m (23.736 mi)	2029	Construction of 1st phase started in June 2021, total length may be changed.
Railway	Sejila tunnel	Tibet, China	37,900 m (23.550 mi)	2030	Part of the Sichuan–Tibet railway. Construction started in November 2020.
Railway (maglev)	Daiichi Shutoken Tunnel	Tokyo, Japan	36,924 m (22.944 mi)	2034 (or later)	Part of the Chuo Shinkansen (Maglev)
Mineral transportation	Woodsmith Mine Tunnel Potash Project Mineral Transport System (MTS)	North York Moors, United Kingdom	36,700 m (22.804 mi)	(?)	6 m in diameter incorporating conveyor and maintenance access. Start of construction was planned for 2016, but actually started in April 2019.
Railway	Gaoligongshan Tunnel	Yunnan, China	34,538 m (21.461 mi)	2025	Railway between Dali and Ruili. Construction started in August 2017.
Railway (maglev)	Daiichi Chukyoken Tunnel	Nagoya, Japan	34,210 m (21.257 mi)	2034 (or later)	Part of the Chuo Shinkansen (Maglev)
Metro	L9	Barcelona, Spain	33,000 m (20.505 mi)	(?) (2009–2016 partial completion)	Excluding branches. Northern section of the line is in operation since 13 December 2009. Southern section of the line is in operation since 12 February 2016. Future of the central section is unclear.
Railway	Oshima Tunnel	Hokkaido, Japan	32,675 m (20.303 mi)	2031	Part of the Hokkaido Shinkansen
Metro	Cross Island Line	MRT, Singapore	29,000 m (18 mi) (Phase 1 only)	2030 (Phase 1); 2032 (Phase 2)	Construction of Phase 1 started in January 2023
Metro	Baku Metro Red line	Baku, Azerbaijan	28,500 m (17.7 mi)	2040	Including extension
Water supply	NCP Canal Main Tunnel	Anuradhapura, Sri Lanka	27,800 m (17.274 mi)	2025	Part of North Central Province Canal under Mahaweli Development programme. Low slope tunnel with gravity flow, 8 m in diameter. Supplies water from Moragahakanda Reservoir to North Central and Northern Provinces. The project made its breakthrough in July 2026.
Railway twin tube	Valico Tunnel	Ligurian Apennines, Italy	27,342 m (16.990 mi)	2026	Breakthrough in September 2020. Part of the Tortona–Genoa high-speed railway.
Railway twin tube	Semmering Base Tunnel	Lower Austria/Styria, Austria	27,300 m (16.963 mi)	2030	Construction of the first contract section started in January 2014. Will cut travel time between Vienna and Graz by 30 minutes and is part of the Baltic–Adriatic Corridor
Road	Rogfast tunnel	Randaberg–Kvitsøy–Bokn, Norway	26,700 m (16.591 mi)	2033	Construction started in January 2018, halted October 2019 due to expected cost overruns, revised plan and 48% cost increase approved November 2020; construction restarted late 2021. Will be the longest road tunnel in the world, and also the deepest undersea tunnel, 392 metres (1,286 ft) below sea level. It will also have a 4,100 m (2.548 mi) connection tunnel from Kvitsøy to the main tunnel.
Railway	Sasson Tunnel	Hokkaido, Japan	26,230 m (16.299 mi)	2031	Part of the Hokkaido Shinkansen
Metro	Suburban Rail Loop East	Melbourne, Victoria, Australia	26,000 m (16 mi) (Note: Length does not include SRL North or West.)	2035	Construction started in June 2022. SRL North is still under early planning, projected to be completed by 2053.
Water supply	Mae Taeng–Mae Ngat Tunnel	Chiang Mai, Thailand	25,624 m (15.922 mi)	(?)	4 m in diameter. This tunnel is a part of "Mae Taeng–Mae Ngat–Mae Kuang Diversion Tunnel Project"
Railway (maglev)	Minami Alps Tunnel	Akaishi Mountains, Japan	25,019 m (15.546 mi)	2034 (or later)	Part of the Chuo Shinkansen (Maglev)
Railway (maglev)	Chuo Alps Tunnel	Kiso Mountains, Japan	23,288 m (14.470 mi)	2034 (or later)	Part of the Chuo Shinkansen (Maglev)
Metro	Metro Manila Subway	Metro Manila, Philippines	23,160 m (14.391 mi)	2028	Only for the dedicated mainline between East Valenzuela and FTI. To be partially opened in 2025.
Railway	Thane Creek Tunnel	Mumbai, India	21,150 m (13.142 mi)	2028	Part of the Mumbai–Ahmedabad high speed railway, construction started in November 2023, 13 m diameter.
Railway	Keylong Rail & Road Tunnel	Kyelang, India	21,150 m (13.142 mi)		Part of the Bhanupali-Leh Railway & Roadway Corridor, construction started in February 2024.
Railway twin tube	Alia Tunnel	Sicily, Italy	19,900 m (12.365 mi)	2030	Part of the Palermo–Catania high-speed railway
Metro	Baku Metro Purple line	Baku, Azerbaijan	18,500 m (11.495 mi)	2030	Under construction
Railway twin tube	Bentong Tunnel (Genting Tunnel)	Bentong, Pahang, Malaysia	18,000 m (11.185 mi)	2027	Part of MRL East Coast Rail Link project. Will became the longest tunnel in South East Asia
Railway	Shiribeshi Tunnel	Hokkaido, Japan	17,975 m (11.169 mi)	2031	Part of the Hokkaido Shinkansen
Metro	İzmir Metro Line M2	İzmir, Turkey	17,800 m (11.060 mi)	2027	
Road and railway	Fehmarn Belt Fixed Link	Fehmarn Belt, Germany/Denmark	17,600 m (10.936 mi)	2029	Construction started in January 2021
Railway	Tateiwa Tunnel	Hokkaido, Japan	16,980 m (10.551 mi)	2031	Part of the Hokkaido Shinkansen
Road	Förbifart Stockholm	Stockholm, Sweden	16,500 m (10.253 mi)	2030	Construction started in August 2014
Road	Tokyo Gaikan Tunnel	Tokyo, Japan	16,200 m (10.066 mi)	2030	Part of the C3 Tokyo Gaikan Expressway
Railway	Zhoushan underwater tunnel	Zhejiang, China	16,200 m (10.066 mi)	2026	Part of the Ningbo–Zhoushan railway. Construction started in December 2020.
Railway twin tube	Chiltern tunnel	Chiltern Hills, United Kingdom	16,040 m (9.967 mi)	2029–2033	Part of High Speed 2, construction started in May 2021, 9.1 m internal diameter
Railway	Uchiura Tunnel	Hokkaido, Japan	15,560 m (9.669 mi)	2031	Part of the Hokkaido Shinkansen
Railway twin tube	Schalderer Tunnel	South Tyrol, Italy	15,400 m (9.569 mi)	2032	Part of the new Brenner Railway
Railway (maglev)	Ina Sanchi Tunnel	Nagano, Japan	15,300 m (9.507 mi)	2034 (or later)	Part of the Chuo Shinkansen (Maglev)
Railway	Helanshan Tunnel	Ningxia, China	14,900 m (9.258 mi)	2026	
Railway	Devprayag Rail Tunnel	Uttarakhand, India	14,570 m (9.053 mi)	2026	Part of Rishikesh–Karnaprayag line, construction started in 2021
Railway (maglev)	Hiyoshi Tunnel	Gifu, Japan	14,532 m (9.030 mi)	2034 (or later)	Part of the Chuo Shinkansen (Maglev)
Road	Cumanday Tunnel	Cordillera Central, Colombia	14,200 m (8.823 mi)		
Road	Zoji-la Tunnel	Zoji La Pass, India	14,200 m (8.823 mi)	2028	Construction started in October 2020
Railway	Patalpani Rail Tunnel	Madhya Pradesh, India	14,000 m (8.699 mi)	2025	
Metro	MRT Orange Line	Bangkok, Thailand	13,770 m (8.556 mi)	2025	Orange Line Phase 1
Railway twin tube	Northolt tunnel	West London, United Kingdom	13,500 m (8.389 mi)	2029–2033	Part of High Speed 2, construction started in October 2022
Metro	Istanbul Metro (Line M12)	Istanbul, Turkey	13,030 m (8.096 mi)	2026	

== World's longest tunnels (advanced planning stage) ==
Type	Name	Location	Length	Year	Comment
Water supply	Tibet-Xinjiang Tunnel	Tibet/Xinjiang, China	1,000,000 m (621.4 mi)	(?)	China preparing the world's longest tunnel to divert a Tibetan river (Yarlung Tsangpo River, part of the Brahmaputra River) to the Taklamakan Desert.
Railway	Bohai Strait tunnel	Bohai Strait, China	123,000 m (76.4 mi)	(?)	Tunnel between Dalian on the Liaodong Peninsula and Yantai on the Shandong Peninsula.
Railway	Talsinki	Helsinki/Tallinn, Finland/Estonia	100,000 m (62.1 mi)	After 2030	Awaiting financing
Water supply	Qinling Tunnel, Han River Diversion to Wei River	Shaanxi, China	98,300 m (61.1 mi)	(?)	
Railway	Serra do Mar Tunnel	Brazil, between São Paulo and Santos	30,000 m (18.6 mi)	(?)	
Road	Suðuroyartunnilin	Faroe Islands, linking Suðuroy island to Sandoy island	26,000 m (16.2 mi)	After 2030	Feasibility study
Railway twin tube	Tachlovice Tunnel	Prague/Beroun, Czech Republic	24,700 m (15.3 mi)	After 2035	Project is on hold
Metro	İzmir Metro Line M3	İzmir, Turkey	22,300 m (13.857 mi)	2020s	
Metro	Istanbul Metro (Line M13)	Istanbul, Turkey	21,900 m (13.6 mi)	2020s	
Railway and electricity	Grimsel Tunnel	Grimsel Pass, Switzerland	21,720 m (13.5 mi)	After 2030	Feasibility study
Railway twin tube	Pacheco Pass Tunnels	Pacheco Pass, California, United States	21,000 m (13.0 mi)	2031	To be built as part of the California High-Speed Rail project
Metro	Baku Metro Blue Line	Baku, Azerbaijan	16,300 m (10.1 mi)	(?)	
Road twin tube	Gohpur – Numaligarh Tunnel	Assam, India	15,600 m (9.693 mi)	(?)	Tunnel under the Brahmaputra River
Road twin tube	Kresna Gorge Tunnel	Kresna, Bulgaria	15,400 m (9.6 mi)	Cancelled	Part of Struma motorway, connecting Sofia and Athens.
Metro	Baku Metro Yellow Line	Baku, Azerbaijan	14,700 m (9.1 mi)	(?)	
Road twin tube	Agua Negra Tunnel	Agua Negra Pass, Argentina/Chile	14,000 m (8.7 mi)	(?)	Awaiting ratification by Chile

== World's longest tunnels (abandoned) ==
Type	Name	Location	Length	Year	Comment
Water supply	Gadara Aqueduct	Roman Empire	140,000 m (87.0 mi)	129–	Water supply for the Decapolis in present-day Jordan

== World's longest tunnels (proposed) ==
- Bering Strait crossing
- Japan–Korea Undersea Tunnel
- Taiwan Strait Tunnel Project

== See also ==
- List of long tunnels by type – contains separate tables for railroad, subway, vehicular, bicycle, water/aqueducts, and also for different building techniques
- List of deepest caves
- List of deepest mines
- Lists of tunnels
- List of longest railway tunnels
  - List of long railway tunnels in China
- List of longest subway tunnel sections
- List of longest bridges
