= List of long tunnels by type =

This page presents the same tunnels as in list of tunnels by length in separate lists according to the different tunnel types.

== Rail ==
Note: This list only contains tunnels that are longer than 25 km (16 mi).

Name	Location	Length	Year	Line
Gotthard Base Tunnel	Switzerland (Alps)	57.1 km (35.5 mi)	2016	Gotthardbahn; Luzern/Zürich-Milan
Seikan Tunnel	Japan (Tsugaru Strait)	53.9 km (33.5 mi)	1988	Kaikyo Line (Hokkaidō Shinkansen)
Channel Tunnel	France/United Kingdom (English Channel)	50.5 km (31.4 mi)	1994	Eurostar; Eurotunnel Shuttle; High Speed 1 (National Rail); LGV Nord (SNCF)
Yulhyeon Tunnel	South Korea (Gyeonggi)	50.3 km (31.3 mi)	2016	Suseo High Speed Railway
Songshan Lake Tunnel	China (Dongguan)	35.4 km (22.0 mi)	2016	Dongguan–Huizhou Intercity Railway
Lötschberg Base Tunnel	Switzerland (Bernese Alps)	34.5 km (21.4 mi)	2007	Lötschbergbahn; Brig - Thun (- Bern - Basel)
Koralm Tunnel	Austria (Koralpe)	32.9 km (20.4 mi)	2025	Koralm Railway
New Guanjiao Tunnel	China (Qinghai)	32.6 km (20.3 mi) (Note: 2 tubes)	2014	Qinghai–Tibet Railway
Guadarrama Tunnel	Spain (Sierra de Guadarrama)	28.4 km (17.6 mi)	2007	LAV Madrid - Valladolid
West Qinling Tunnel	China (Gansu)	28.2 km (17.5 mi)	2016	Qinghai–Tibet Railway
Taihang Tunnel	China (Shanxi)	27.8 km (17.3 mi); 27.8 km (17.3 mi)	2007	Shijiazhuang–Taiyuan High-Speed Railway
Hakkōda Tunnel	Japan (Hakkōda Mountains)	26.5 km (16.5 mi)	2010	Tōhoku Shinkansen
XRL	Hong Kong (New Territories and Kowloon)	26 km (16.2 mi)	2018	Guangzhou-Shenzhen-Hong Kong Express Rail Link Hong Kong Section (Note: A further 4 km (2.5 mi) on the opposite side of the Hong Kong-China border.)
Iwate-Ichinohe Tunnel	Japan (Ōu Mountains)	25.8 km (16.0 mi)	2002	Tōhoku Shinkansen

=== Under construction ===
Note: This list only contains tunnels that are longer than 25 km (16 mi).

Name	Location	Length	Expected completion	Line
Mont d'Ambin base tunnel	France/Italy (Cottian Alps)	57.5 km (35.7 mi)	2029	Lyon Turin Ferroviaire
Brenner Base Tunnel	Austria/Italy (Stubai Alps)	55 km (34.2 mi)	2028	Brenner Railway
Yigong Tunnel 易贡隧道	China (Tibet)	42.5 km (26.4 mi)	2030	Nyingchi–Ya'an railway
Sejila Mountain Tunnel 色季拉山隧道	China (Tibet)	37.9 km (23.5 mi)	2030	Nyingchi–Ya'an railway
Metropolitan Area Tunnel No. 1	Japan (Tokyo)	37.168 km (23.1 mi)	2027+	Chūō Shinkansen
Pearl River Tunnel 珠江隧道	China (Guangdong)	36.043 km (22.4 mi)	2021	Guangzhou–Foshan circular intercity railway
Duomuge Tunnel 多木格隧道	China (Tibet)	36 km (22.4 mi)	2030	Nyingchi–Ya'an railway
Gaoligongshan Tunnel	China (Yunnan)	34.5 km (21.5 mi)	2022	Dali-Ruili Railway
Chukyo Area Tunnel No.1	Japan (Aichi)	34.210 km (21.3 mi)	2027+	Chūō Shinkansen
Oshima Tunnel	Japan (Hokkaido)	32.675 km (20.3 mi)	2031	Hokkaidō Shinkansen
Mangkangshan Tunnel	China (Tibet)	29.4 km (18.3 mi)	2026	Kangding-Linzhi Railway
Ping'an Tunnel	China (Sichuan)	28.4 km (17.6 mi); 28.2 km (17.5 mi) (Note: 2 tubes)	2023	Chengdu–Lanzhou Railway
Semmering Base Tunnel	Austria (Raxalpe)	27.3 km (17.0 mi)	2027	Southern Railway
Valico Tunnel	Italy (Liguria, Piedmont)	27.250 km (16.9 mi)	2023	Tortona–Genoa high-speed railway
Sasson Tunnel	Japan (Hokkaido)	26.2 km (16.3 mi)	2031	Hokkaidō Shinkansen
Musil Tunnel	South Korea (Wonju)	25.1 km (15.6 mi)	2020	Jungang Line
Minshan Tunnel	China (Sichuan)	25.0 km (15.6 mi)	2023	Chengdu–Lanzhou Railway
Southern Alps Tunnel	Japan (Nagano, Shizuoka, Yamanashi)	25.019 km (15.5 mi)	2027+	Chūō Shinkansen

== Underground rapid transit ==
Only continuous tunnel sections should be included, at least 42 km (26 mi) long, excluding branches from the longest tunnel.

Name	System	Country	Stations	Length	Year
Lines 3-11	Suzhou Metro	China	Line 3 and Line 11 are connected at Weiting Station with through trains passing by.	86.54 km (53.77 mi)	2019–2023
M11	Istanbul Metro	Turkey	Gayrettepe – Halkalı	69 km (43 mi)	2023–2025
Line 6	Chengdu Metro	China	Wangcong Temple – Lanjiagou	68.2 km (42.4 mi)	2020
Line 19	Chengdu Metro	China	Huangshi to Tianfu	67 km (42 mi)	2020–2023
Line 1	Qingdao Metro	China	Dongguozhuang to Wangjiagang	59.82 km (37.17 mi)	2020–2021
Line 18	Guangzhou Metro	China	Xiancun to Wanqingsha	58.3 km (36.2 mi)	2021
Line 3	Guangzhou Metro	China	Airport North – Panyu Square	57.93 km (36.00 mi)	2005–2018
Bolshaya Koltsevaya line	Moscow Metro	Russia	Circle route	57.54 km (35.75 mi) (excluding Moscow-City branch)	2018–2023
Line 10	Beijing Subway	China	Circle route	57.1 km (35.5 mi)	2008–2013
Line 6	Beijing Subway	China	Jin'anqiao – Lucheng	53.4 km (33.2 mi)	2012–2018
Seoul Subway Line 5 (longest branch)	Seoul Subway	South Korea	Banghwa–Hanam Geomdansan	51.7 km (32.1 mi)	1995–2021
Line 2	Wuhan Metro	China	Julong Boulevard - Fozuling	50.347 km (31.284 mi)	2012–2019
Arbatsko-Pokrovskaya line	Moscow Metro	Russia	Pyatnitskoye Shosse – Shchyolkovskaya	45.1 km (28.0 mi)	1938–2012
Sokolnicheskaya line	Moscow Metro	Russia	Kommunarka – Bulvar Rokossovskogo	44.5 km (27.7 mi)	1935–2019
Lyublinsko-Dmitrovskaya line	Moscow Metro	Russia	Zyablikovo – Fiztekh	44.3 km (27.5 mi)	1995–2023
Zamoskvoretskaya line	Moscow Metro	Russia	Khovrino – Alma-Atinskaya	42.8 km (26.6 mi)	1938–2018
Line 8	Beijing Subway	China	Yuzhi Lu – Wufutang	42.6 km (26.5 mi)	2012–2021
Line 15	Shanghai Metro	China	Gucun Park – Zizhu Hi-tech Park	42.3 km (26.3 mi)	2021
Line 5	Chengdu Metro	China	Jiudaoyan – Huilong	42.3 km (26.3 mi)	2019
Tagansko-Krasnopresnenskaya line	Moscow Metro	Russia	Planernaya – Kotelniki	42.2 km (26.2 mi)	1966–2015

=== Under construction ===
Only continuous tunnel sections should be included, at least 30 km (19 mi) long.

Name	System	Countries	Stations	Length	Expected completion
Line 15	Paris Métro	France	(circle route, all underground)	75 km (46.6 mi)	2026–2031
Cross Island Line	Mass Rapid Transit (Singapore)	Singapore	(Linear route with branch section, all underground)	65.5 km (40.7 mi) (Note: With stage 5, excluding potential extension from Punggol to Seletar Airport under planning)	2029–2031
L9 / L10	Barcelona Metro	Spain	Linear route	43.7 km (27.2 mi) (Note: including branches)	2016 (Note: partially, central section unknown)
Thomson–East Coast Line	Mass Rapid Transit (Singapore)	Singapore	(Linear route, all underground excluding last 2 km [1.2 mi])	42.8 km (26.6 mi)	2026–2028 (Note: extension to Tanah Merah expected beyond 2030)
Green line	Baku Metro	Azerbaijan	(circle route, all underground)	41.8 km (26.0 mi)	2040

== Road ==
Name	Location	Length	Year	Tubes	Road	Notes
Lærdal	Norway (Lærdal–Aurland)	24.51 km (15.2 mi)	2000	1	E16	Longest road tunnel in the world.
Yamate Tunnel	Japan (Tokyo)	18.20 km (11.3 mi)	2007; 2010; 2015	2	C2, Shuto Expressway	
Zhongnanshan Tunnel	China (Shaanxi)	18.04 km (11.2 mi)	2007	2	G65, Xi'an-Zhashui Expressway	
Jinpingshan Tunnel	China (Sichuan)	17.54 km (10.9 mi)	2011	2	between sites of Jinping-I and Jinping-II Hydropower Station	2 tubes, 17.540 km and 17.485 km
St. Gotthard	Switzerland (Uri - Ticino)	16.918 km (10.5 mi)	1980	1	A2/E35	"World's longest tunnel" 1980 - 2000
Zigana Tunnel	Turkey (Maçka - Torul)	14.481 km (9.0 mi)	2023	2	D.885, E97	
Ovit Tunnel	Turkey (İkizdere - İspir)	14.346 km (8.9 mi)	2018	2	D.925	
Ryfylke tunnel	Norway (Stavanger–Strand)	14.3 km (8.9 mi)	2019	2	13	The longest underwater road tunnel in the world
Arlberg	Austria (Vorarlberg - Tyrol)	13.972 km (8.7 mi)	1978	1	S16/E60	"World's longest tunnel" 1979 - 1980
Xishan Tunnel	China (Shanxi)	13.654 km (8.5 mi)	2012	2	S56 Shanxi Taiyuan-Gujiao Expressway	Left tube：13.654 m, right tube：13.570 m
New Erlangshan Tunnel	China (Sichuan)	13.433 km (8.3 mi)	2018	2	Ya'an-Kangding Expressway	Left tube: 13.433 m, right tube: 13.381 m
Hongtiguan Tunnel	China (Shanxi)	13.122 km (8.2 mi)	2013	2	S76 Shanxi Changzhi-Pingshun Expressway	Left tube: 13.122 m, right tube: 13.098 m
Hsuehshan	Taiwan	12.942 km (8.0 mi)	2006	2	5	
Fréjus	France - Italy	12.895 km (8.0 mi)	1980	2	E70	The longest road tunnel across an international border
KPE & MCE Expressway Tunnel	Singapore	12.46 km (7.7 mi)	2008; 2013	1*	Kallang–Paya Lebar Expressway (KPE) and Marina Coastal Expressway (MCE)	Tunnel section of KPE (8.13 km) and MCE (4.33 km) are contiguous, hence classified as one tunnel. *Dual carriageway 12 Lanes of traffic (maximum width: 70m) with each direction separated only by a full-height wall, thus considered to be one tube.
Maijishan Tunnel	China (Gansu)	12.29 km (7.6 mi)	2009	2	G30, Baoji-Tianshui Expressway	2 tubes, 12.290 km and 12.286 km
Mt. Blanc	France - Italy (Alps)	11.611 km (7.2 mi)	1965	1	E25	"World's longest tunnel" 1965 - 1979
Gudvangen	Norway (Gudvangen–Flåm)	11.428 km (7.1 mi)	1991	1	E16	
Yunshan Tunnel	China (Shanxi)	11.408 km (7.1 mi)	2014	2	G2516 Dongyin-Luliang Expressway	Left tube: 11.408 m, right tube: 11.377 m
Eysturoyartunnilin	Faroe Islands	11.238 km (7.0 mi)	2020	1		Forked with roundabout and 3 entries. Segments 7.5 km (4.7 mi), 2.2 km (1.4 mi) and 1.7 km (1.1 mi) long.
Baojiashan Tunnel	China (Shaanxi)	11.200 km (7.0 mi)	2009	2	G65, Xi'an-Ankang Expressway	Left tube: 11.200 m, right tube: 11.195 m
Folgefonna	Norway (Odda–Eitrheim)	11.15 km (6.9 mi)	2001	1	49	
Kan-etsu Tunnel	Japan (Gunma - Niigata)	11.055 km (6.9 mi)	1985; 1991	2	Kan-Etsu Expressway	Two tubes (the older 10.926 m)
Inje-Yangyang Tunnel	South Korea (Gangwon Province)	10.962 km (6.85 mi)	2017	2	Seoul–Yangyang Expressway	10.965 km (Seoul bound) / 10.962 km (Yangyang bound)
Sandoyartunnilin	Faroe Islands	10.900 km (6.8 mi)	2023	1		
Toven Tunnel	Norway (Leirfjord–Vefsn)	10.655 km (6.6 mi)	2014	1	78	
Baotashan	China (Shanxi)	10.480 km (6.512 mi)	2012	2	S66 Shanxi Hefen Expressway	Left tube: 10.192 m, right tube: 10.480 m
Hida	Japan (Gifu)	10.71 km (6.7 mi)	2008	1	Tokai-Hokuriku Expressway	
Gran Sasso d'Italia	Italy (Abruzzo)	10.176 km (6.3 mi)	1984; 1995	2	A24	Two tubes (the newer 10.173 m)
Jondal Tunnel	Norway (Mauranger–Jondal)	10.05 km (6.2 mi)	2012	1	49	
Nibashan Tunnel (Note: previous name is Daxiangling Tunnel)	China (Sichuan)	10.007 km (6.2 mi)	2012	2	G5, Beijing-Kunming Expressway	2 tubes, 10.007 km and 9.962 km
Duplex A86	France (Rueil-Malmaison - Versailles)	10 km (6.2 mi)	2009/2011	1*	A86	*the two two-lane directions are superimposed (hence duplex) in one tube
Many more tunnels exist that are shorter than 10 kilometres (6 mi)

=== Under construction ===
Name	Location	Length	Year	Tubes	Road	Notes
Boknafjord Tunnel	Norway (Stavanger/Randaberg–Kvitsøy–Bokn)	26.7 km (16.6 mi)	2031	2	European route E39	Mostly underwater. Will have a record depth of 390 m below sea level. A side tunnel (Kvitsøy Tunnel, 4 km) will connect Kvitsøy. Construction began on 4 January 2018.
Tianshan Shengli Tunnel	China (Xinjiang)	22.1 km (13.7 mi)	2025	2	Ürümqi–Ruoqiang Expressway	
Fehmarn Belt fixed link	Denmark / Germany	17.6 km (11 mi)	2029	5	E47	Immersed tunnel combining road and rail. The tunnel segments consist of 5 tubes, 2 tubes for road, 1 for emergency and maintenance access and 2 for rail.
Bypass Stockholm	Sweden (Stockholm)	16.5 km (10.3 mi)	2030	2	E4	
Tokyo Gaikan Tunnel	Japan (Tokyo)	16.2 km (10.1 mi)	2030	2	C3 Tokyo Gaikan Expressway	
Zoji-la Tunnel	India (Jammu Kashmir)	14.2 km (8.8 mi)	2026	1	Srinagar-Kargil-Leh highway	
Micangshan Tunnel	China (Sichuan)	13.833 km (8.6 mi)	2018	2	Bazhong-Shaanxi Expressway	Left tube: 13.833 m, right tube: 13.792 m
Fjarðarheiðargöng	Iceland	13.500 km (8.4 mi)	2032	1	Route 93	In planning. Actual construction starts in 2026.
Dongtianshan Tunnel	China (Xinjiang)	13.240 km (8.2 mi)	2020	1	National Highway G575	
Huangtuliang Tunnel	China (Sichuan)	13.010 km (8.1 mi)	2021	2	Mianyang-JiuzhaigouExpressway	
NSC Expressway Tunnel	Singapore	12.5 km (7.8 mi)	2026	1	North-South Corridor, Singapore	Tunnel sections of NSC are (10.4 km), while sub-surface section is (2.1 km). Dual carriageway of 6 lanes with each direction separated only by a full-height wall, thus considered to be one tube.
Gaoloushan Tunnel	China (Gansu)	12.248 km (7.6 mi)	2020	2	Pingliang-Mianyang Expressway	
Murovdagh Tunnel	Azerbaijan (Kalbajar)	11.713 km (7.3 mi)	2027	2	M2, European route E60	
Yunshan Tunnel	China (Shanxi)	11.408 km (7.1 mi)	??	2	S66 Shanxi Hefen Expressway	Left tube: 11.408 m, right tube: 11.377 m
Many more tunnels that are shorter than 10 kilometres (6 mi) are under construction

== Water ==
Name	Location	Length	Year	Notes
Delaware Aqueduct	New York, United States	137 km (85.1 mi)	1945	Water supply. Drilled through solid rock.
Päijänne Water Tunnel	Southern Finland, Finland	120 km (74.6 mi)	1982	Water supply (16 m^{2} cross section)
Dahuofang Water Tunnel	Liaoning Province, China	85.3 km (53.0 mi)	2009	Water supply (8 m in diameter)
Orange–Fish River Tunnel	South Africa	82.8 km (51.4 mi)	1975	Irrigation (22.5 m^{2} cross section)
Bolmen Water Tunnel	Kronoberg/Scania, Sweden	82 km (51.0 mi)	1987	Water supply, 8 m^{2}.
Želivka Water Tunnel	Central Bohemian Region, Czech Republic	51.1 km (31.8 mi)	1972	Water supply, 5 m^{2}.
Arpa-Sevan Tunnel	Armenia (at the time of construction USSR)	48.3 km (30.0 mi)	1981	Water supply
#1 Tunnel, Yellow River Diversion to Shanxi North Line	Shanxi, China	43.7 km (27.2 mi)	2011	Water supply
#7 Tunnel, Yellow River Diversion to Shanxi South Line	Shanxi, China	43.5 km (27.0 mi)	2002	Water supply
High Island Water Tunnels	Sai Kung Peninsula, New Territories, Hong Kong	40 km (24.9 mi)	1976	Water supply
Kárahnjúkar Hydropower Plant	Eastern Region, Iceland	39.7 km (24.7 mi)	2003–2007	Hydroelectric. 7.2-7.6 meters in diameter. Part of a wider complex of tunnels that are 72 kilometers in length combined
Quabbin Aqueduct	Massachusetts, United States	39.6 km (24.6 mi)	1905	Water supply
Evanger Hydropower Plant	Evanger, Norway	34.4 km (21.4 mi)	1977	Hydroelectric. 30 m^{2}
Talave Tunnel	Albacete, Spain	31.8 km (19.8 mi)	1979	Part of the Tagus-Segura Water Transfer.
Evinos - Mornos Tunnel	Aetolia-Acarnania, Greece	29.4 km (18.3 mi)	1992–1995	Water supply
Palacio - Río blanco Tunnel	Bogotá, Colombia	28.4 km (17.6 mi)	1984	Water supply
Melamchi Water Tunnel	Nepal, Melamchi to Kathmandu	27 km (16.8 mi)	2021	Water supply
Şanlıurfa Irrigation Tunnels	Turkey	26.4 km (16.4 mi)	2005	Irrigation
Gilgel Gibe II Power Station headrace tunnel	Ethiopia	26 km (16.2 mi)	2005–2009	Hydroelectric. Tunnel partially collapsed, was repaired in 2010.
Tai Lam Chung Tunnels	Tai Lam Chung to Chai Wan Kok, New Territories, Hong Kong	24.45 km (15.19 mi)	1957–1974	Water supply
Grande Dixence headrace tunnel	Switzerland	24 km (14.9 mi)	1951–2010	Hydroelectric. Total tunnel system 100 km.
Kishanganga Hydroelectric Project	India	23.2 km (14.4 mi)	2017	Hydroelectric
Tala Hydroelectricity Project headrace tunnel	Bhutan	22 km (13.7 mi)	2004	Hydroelectric. 6.8 meters in diameter.
Vorotan-Arpa Tunnel	Armenia	21.7 km (13.5 mi)	2004	Water supply.
Plover Cove Stage 1 Tunnels	Plover Cove, New Territories, Hong Kong	20.2 km (12.6 mi)	1965–1971	Water supply
Olmos Transandino Project	Peru	20 km (12.4 mi)	2011	Water supply
Mantaro Hydroelectricity Project	Peru	19.8 km (12.3 mi)	1973	Hydroelectric
Tatev Hydroelectric Power Station Water Tunnel	Armenia (at the time of construction Soviet Union)	18.4 km (11.4 mi)	1970	Hydroelectric
Plover Cove Stage 2 Tunnels	Plover Cove, New Territories, Hong Kong	18.2 km (11.3 mi)	1967	Water supply
Suruç Water Tunnel	Suruç, Şanlıurfa Province, Turkey	17.2 km (10.7 mi)	2014	Irrigation
Mavi Tünel (Blue Tunnel)	Konya, Turkey	17 km (10.6 mi)	2012	Irrigation
Sri Ranganayaka Sagar - Kondapochamma Sagar Tunnel	Telangana, India	16.18 km (10.1 mi)	2020	Irrigation. Part of Link-IV, Package-12 of Kaleshwaram Lift Irrigation Project.
Inguri Hydroelectric Power Station Water Tunnel	Georgia (at the time of construction Soviet Union)	15.3 km (9.5 mi)	1978	Hydroelectric
Many more tunnels exist that are shorter than 15 kilometres (9 mi)

=== Under construction ===
Name	Location	Length	Year	Notes
Ramappa to Dharmasagar Tunnel	Telangana, India	49.06 km (30.5 mi)	2022	Irrigation. Part of J. Chokka Rao Devadula lift irrigation sceheme
Srisailam Left Bank Canal Tunnel - I	Srisailam Dam, India	43.931 km (27.3 mi)	2021	Irrigation
Mae Taeng–Mae Ngat Tunnel	Chiang Mai, Thailand	25.624 km (15.9 mi)	2021	Irrigation. 4 m in diameter
Mae Ngat–Mae Kuang Tunnel	Chiang Mai, Thailand	22.975 km (14.3 mi)	2021	Irrigation. 4.2 m in diameter
Poola Subbaiah Veligonda Project Tunnel - II	Andhra Pradesh, India	18.83 km (11.7 mi)	2021	Irrigation
Poola Subbaiah Veligonda Project Tunnel - I	Andhra Pradesh, India	18.82 km (11.7 mi)	2020	Irrigation
Many more tunnels that are shorter than 15 kilometres (9 mi) are under construction

Note: There are buried oil and gas pipelines, up to several thousand kilometers long. See also:

- List of oil pipelines
- List of natural gas pipelines

== Bicycle and pedestrian ==
Most of the tunnels listed were built for other purposes, and have not been redesigned. The Fyllingsdalentunnelen is one example of a tunnel built to purpose from the start.

The tunnels listed here can be either be pure cycling tunnels and/or pedestrian tunnels with separate tubes, or shared-use tunnels (i.e. having a shared lane, or a bike lane and footpath without a non-crossable physical separation).

Name	Type (pedestrian / cyclist)	Location	Length	Trail
Snoqualmie Tunnel	Former railway tunnel, Gravel, No lighting	United States, King and Kittitas Counties, Washington	3,625 m (11,893 ft)	Palouse to Cascades State Park Trail
Fyllingsdalstunnelen	Purpose-built, Shared-use path, Two bikelanes, Slightly elevated sidewalk, Asphalt, Good lighting	Norway, Bergen	2,900 m (9,514 ft)	Fyllingsdalen to Bergen City Center
St. Paul Pass Tunnel	Former railway tunnel, Shared-use path, Gravel, No lighting	United States, Montana and Idaho	2,736 m (8,976 ft)	The Route of the Hiawatha
Slavošovský tunel	Unfinished railway tunnel,^{sv} Gravel, No lighting	Slovakia, Slavošovce, Košický kraj	2,400 m (7,874 ft)	Slavošovce to Revúca blue Trail number 2589
Old Caoling Tunnel	Former railway tunnel, Shared-use path	Taiwan, Yilan County and New Taipei City	2,167 m (7,110 ft)	Abandoned single-track railway tunnel
Kerem Tunnel	Utility tunnel, Asphalt, Lighting, Cycling only	Israel, Jerusalem	2,100 m (6,890 ft)	Jerusalem Bicycle Trails
Sideling Hill Tunnel	Former railway tunnel, Former car tunnel, Asphalt, No lighting	United States, Fulton County, Pennsylvania	2,067 m (6,781 ft)	Pike 2 Bike Trail
Kinuura Tunnel	Car tunnel and separate Pedestrian tunnel	Japan, Aichi Prefecture	1,700 m (5,577 ft)	
Combe Down Tunnel	Former railway tunnel, Asphalt, Lighting	United Kingdom, Bath, England	1,672 m (5,486 ft)	Two Tunnels Greenway
Tunnel du Bois Clair	Former railway tunnel, Asphalt, Lighting, Summer open only	France, Sologny	1,600 m (5,249 ft)	Voie Verte de Bourgogne du Sud (Chalon-sur-Saône to Mâcon)
Niwärch Stollen	Irrigation tunnel, Gravel, No lighting	Switzerland, Ausserberg, Valais	1,379 m (4,524 ft)	Niwärch Bisse
Claudius Crozet Blue Ridge Tunnel	Former railway tunnel, Asphalt, No lighting	United States, Nelson/Augusta County, Virginia	1,291 m (4,237 ft)	Claudius Crozet Blue Ridge Tunnel Trail
Norwalk Tunnel	Former railway tunnel, Dirt road, No lighting, Only walking recommended	United States, Elroy, Sparta, Wisconsin	1,161 m (3,809 ft)	Elroy-Sparta State Trail
Wassertunnel Gredetschtal	Waterline tunnel, Gravel, No lighting	Switzerland, Mund	1,120 m (3,675 ft)	Wyssa Suonen Trail
Tidenham Tunnel	Former railway tunnel, Shared-use path, Lighting, Asphalt, Summer open only	United Kingdom, Tidenham and Tintern	1,086 m (3,563 ft)	Wye Valley Greenway
Karangahake Tunnel	Former railway tunnel, Shared-use path, Asphalt pavement, Lighting	New Zealand, Waihi	1,086 m (3,563 ft)	Hauraki Rail Trail
Rays Hill Tunnel	Former railway tunnel, Former car tunnel, Asphalt, No lighting	United States, Bedford and Fulton Counties, Pennsylvania	1,076 m (3,530 ft)	Pike 2 Bike Trail
Maastunnel	Purpose built, Separate cyclist tube, Separate pedestrian tube, Concrete floor, Good lighting	Netherlands, Rotterdam	1,070 m (3,510 ft)	
Bonassola Pastorelli Tunnel	Former coastal railway tunnel, Asphalt, Two bike lanes, One walking lane	Italy, Bonassola	1,036 m (3,399 ft)	Pista Ciclopedonale Maremonti
Kennerdell Tunnel	Former railway tunnel, Shared use, Asphalt, No lighting	United States, Venango County, Pennsylvania	1,021 m (3,350 ft)	Erie to Pittsburgh Trail
Big Savage Tunnel	Former railway tunnel, Asphalt, Lighting, Summer open only	United States, Somerset County, Pennsylvania	1,004 m (3,294 ft)	Great Allegheny Passage

== Sewerage ==
- Spotswood sewer tunnel
- Thames Tideway Tunnel

== Power ==
- London Power Tunnels
- Azabu-Hibiya Common Utility Duct

== Gas ==
- Humber Gas Tunnel

== Bored ==
- Channel Tunnel

== Cut-and-cover ==
- Metropolitan Railway

== Mined ==
- Caltrain San Francisco Downtown extension
- City Rail Link
- Crossrail (Bond Street station)
- (Part of) Küssnacht Southern Bypass
- (Part of) Wanchai Bypass

== Drill and blast ==
- Lötschberg Base Tunnel

== Immersed tube ==
- Conwy Tunnel
- Medway Tunnel

== Double-decker or multi-level ==
- Black Hill tunnels (rail)
- Central Kowloon Route (partly) (road)
- Great Istanbul Tunnel (rail and road) (proposed; triple-decker)
- Island line - three stretches: between Sheung Wan and Admiralty stations, between Fortress Hill and Admiralty stations, and between Tai Koo and Shau Kei Wan stations (rail)
- Kwun Tong line and Tsuen Wan line between Prince Edward and Yau Ma Tei stations
- Lion Rock Tunnel and Second Lion Rock Tunnel (road, and water and towngas supply)
- LIRR Manhattan Tunnel (rail)
- Maastricht A2 tunnel (road)
- Narodnogo Opolcheniya street tunnel (road)
- State Route 99 tunnel (road)

== See also ==
- List of long railway tunnels in China
- List of long road tunnels in China
- List of longest bridges in the world
- List of longest tunnels
- List of tunnels
- Tunnel
