= Lists of tunnels =

The following articles contain lists of tunnels:

- List of tunnels by location
- List of longest tunnels
- List of long tunnels by type
- List of international tunnels

See also Category:Lists of tunnels and Category:Tunnels.
