= Erie to Pittsburgh Trail =

Prospective rail trail

- Length: 270 mi (430 km)
- Location: Western Pennsylvania and Western New York
- Use: Cycling, Hiking
- Grade: 2% maximum
- Difficulty: Easy
- Sights: Allegheny River
- Hazards: Severe Weather
- Surface: Crushed Limestone, Asphalt, Dirt

The Erie to Pittsburgh Trail is a 270-mile (430 km) rail trail being developed between Erie and Pittsburgh in Western Pennsylvania and Western New York. It will connect to the Great Allegheny Passage (GAP), creating a 605 mi (974 km) off-road route between Erie and Washington, D.C. via the GAP and the C&O Canal. It will also connect to the Erie Canal trail via New York Bike Route 517 along Lake Erie.

There are two tunnels on the trail's route: Rockland Tunnel (2,868 ft; 874 m) and Kennerdell Tunnel (3,350 ft; 1,020 m). The Kennerdell Tunnel is one of the longest rail trail tunnels in the United States and among the longest bicycle/pedestrian tunnels in the world.
