= Suruç Water Tunnel =

Irrigation tunnel in Turkey

Coordinates: 36.9764°N 38.4269°E

- Interactive map of Suruç Water Tunnel

Overview
- Official name: Suruç Tüneli
- Location: Suruç, Şanlıurfa Province
- Status: Active

Operation
- Work began: March 18, 2009
- Opened: March 9, 2014; 12 years ago
- Operator: State Hydraulic Works (DSI)
- Character: Water tunnel

Technical
- Length: 17.185 km (10.678 mi)

Location of Suruç Water Tunnel in Turkey

Suruç Water Tunnel (Turkish: Suruç Tüneli is a water supply tunnel located in Suruç district of Şanlıurfa Province, southeastern Turkey. The purpose of the tunnel is to provide irrigation for the Suruç Valley from Atatürk Dam. With its length of 17.185 km (10.678 mi), it is the country's longest tunnel.

== Technical features ==
The water tunnel was commissioned by the State Hydraulic Works (DSI) on December 25, 2008. For the building of the water tunnel, Ilci Construction Inc. was contracted. The construction works at an altitude of 580 m (1,900 ft) AMSL began on March 18, 2009. The excavation of the water tunnel was carried out with a tunnel boring machine (TBM), which is 152 m (499 ft) long and has a cutting shield of 7.83 m (25.7 ft) diameter. The TBM was transported from Italy on 300 trailers, and its assembly completed after twelve months on August 21, 2010. Synchronised with the progress of excavation, the inner walls of the tunnel were lined with 30 cm (12 in) thick precast concrete hexagons. The average daily progress of the excavation works was between 30–40 m (98–131 ft). The water tunnel has an average downhill slope of 0.49% through the Gazientep Formation of the Eocene and Oligocene geological period.

== Economics ==
The construction cost about ₺2 billion. As part of the Southeastern Anatolia Project, it supplies water to agricultural land covering an area of about 950 km^{2} (370 sq mi) in Suruç Valley and to 134 populated places in and around Suruç. With its inner diameter of 7 m (23 ft), the water tunnel has a discharge capacity of 90 m^{3}/s (3,200 cu ft/s), which makes it bigger than many rivers in Turkey. It is expected that the project will create jobs for at least 190,000 people in the region. With irrigation by the Suruç Water Tunnel, over 8,000 farmers will be able to produce more profitable agricultural product. Ministry of Forest and Water Management Veysel Eroğlu stated that its contribution to the country's economy will as much as ₺270 million annually.

== See also ==
- List of long tunnels by type
