= Kinuura Tunnel =

Undersea tunnel in Japan

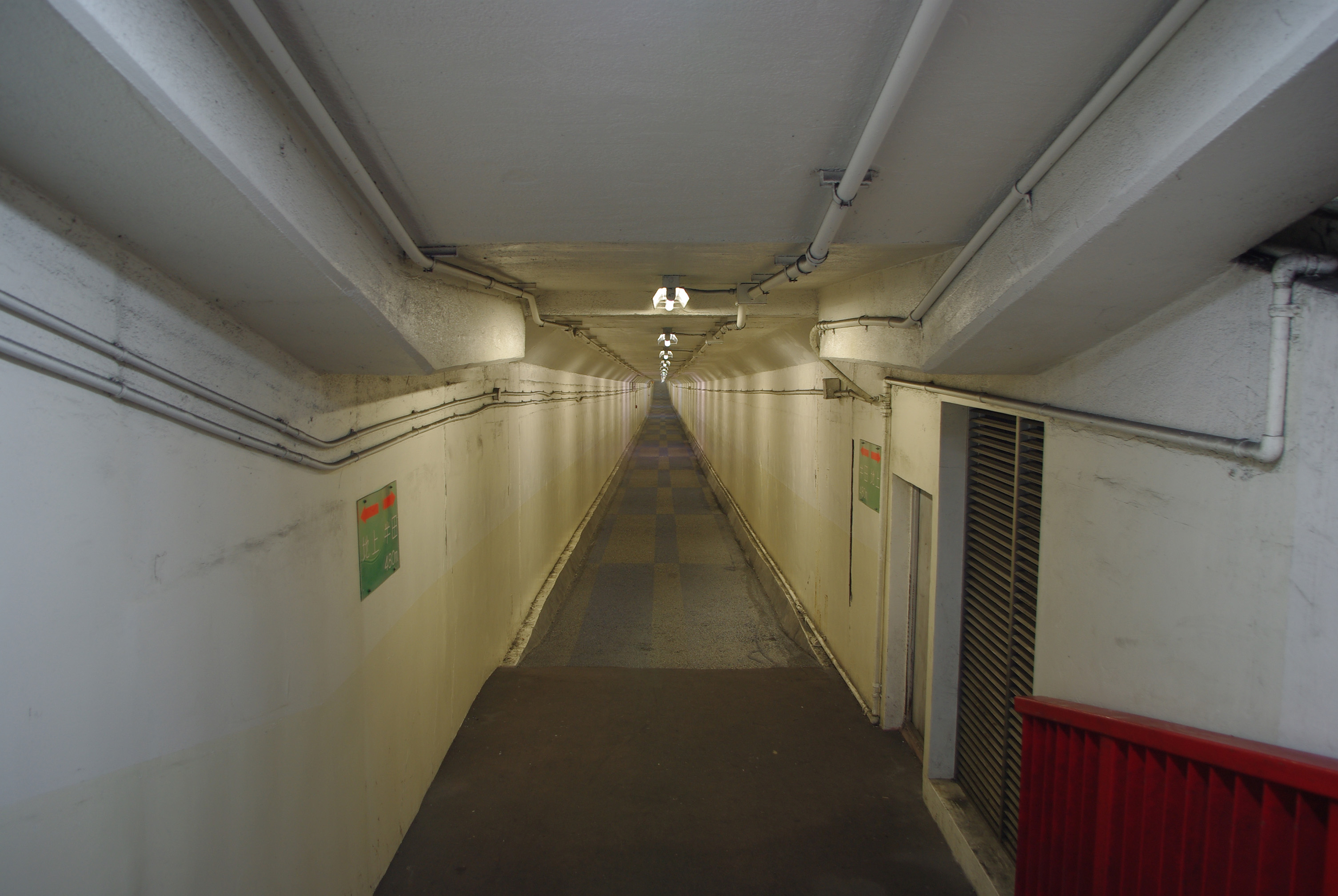
- Entrance to pedestrian tunnel
- Interactive map of Kinuura Tunnel

Overview
- Location: Kinuura Port, Mikawa Bay
- Coordinates: 34.874°N 136.966°E
- Route: Route 256
- Start: Handa, Aichi
- End: Hekinan, Aichi

Operation
- Work began: October 4, 1969
- Opened: July 31, 1973; 52 years ago
- Toll: ¥250 (regular cars)

Technical
- Length: 1.7 kilometres (1.1 mi)
- No. of lanes: 4

Kinuura Tunnel (衣浦トンネル, kinuura tonneru) is an undersea tunnel in Japan for cars and pedestrians which connects Handa, Aichi with Hekinan, Aichi under the Mikawa Bay at Kinuura Port. The tunnel provides 2 lanes of road going in each direction, and a separate pedestrian tunnel. The pedestrian tunnel plays a radio broadcast, and it is accessible by 11 flights of stairs on either side. Both the Handa side and Hekinan side have public parks near the exits to the tunnel.

== See also ==
- Mikawa Bay
- Handafutō Station
