= Ovit Tunnel =

Highway tunnel at Mount Ovit

Ovit Tunnel Ovit Tüneli
- Location within Turkey

Overview
- Location: İkizdere, Rize Province - İspir, Erzurum Province
- Coordinates: 40.62438°N 40.82382°E
- Status: Operational
- Route: D.925

Operation
- Work began: 12 May 2012
- Opened: 13 June 2018; 8 years ago
- Owner: General Directorate of Highways
- Traffic: automotive

Technical
- Length: 14,346 m (47,067 ft)

Ovit Tunnel (Turkish: Ovit Tüneli), is a highway tunnel at Mount Ovit between İkizdere, Rize Province and İspir, Erzurum Province in northeastern Turkey. With its length of 14,346 m (47,067 ft) (including 1,369 m cut and cover avalanche tunnel) in twin tubes, it is the country's second longest tunnel after Zigana Tunnel.

The tunnel was projected to connect Erzurum with Rize in order to enable Eastern Anatolian's access to the Black Sea. The first gateaway project dates back to 1880 during the Ottoman Empire times, without going into realization. In 1930, a highway was built with a workforce of 1,500 people who connected İspir with İkizdere, passing over Mount Ovit, which is 2,640 m (8,660 ft) high. The current route D.925, however, it was built to bypass the Ovit Pass at 2,640 m (8,660 ft) elevation.

The construction works of Ovit Tunnel and its connection roads started with a groundbreaking ceremony held on 12 May 2012 in presence of Prime Minister Recep Tayyip Erdoğan. It was planned that the tunnel would be opened to traffic in 2015, but later the opening date was set to 2018. Ovit Tunnel is the world's 7th longest highway tunnel. The tunnel was opened on 13 June 2018 by Recep Tayyip Erdogan.
