= Sasson Tunnel =

Tunnel in Japan

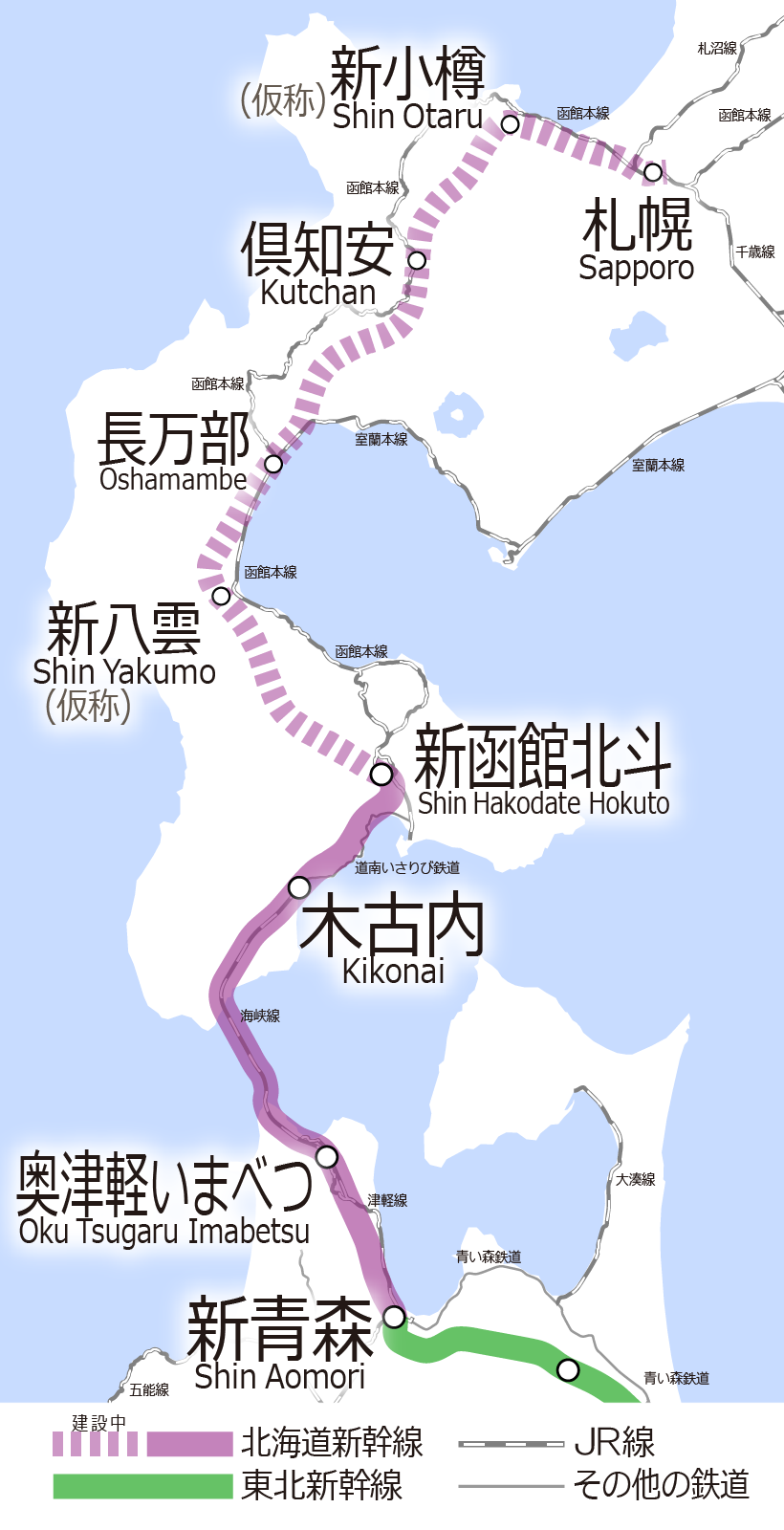
Sasson Tunnel map between Shin Otaru station and Sapporo Station

Sasson Tunnel (札樽トンネル, Sasson tonneru) is a tunnel on JR's Hokkaido Shinkansen located between Otaru city and Sapporo Station in Hokkaido with total length of 26.230 km. It is under construction and was started excavation in 2020 in addition to existing JR railways in Hokkaido. Once completed, it will be the third longest tunnel on the Hokkaido Shinkansen line, after Seikan Tunnel and Oshima Tunnel. The Hokkaido Shinkansen line between Shin-Hakodate-Hokuto Station and Sapporo Station is scheduled to open in 2031.

== See also ==
- List of tunnels in Japan
- Seikan Tunnel undersea tunnel between Honshu-Hokkaido islands
- Kanmon Railway Tunnel undersea tunnel between Honshu-Kyushu islands
- Sakhalin–Hokkaido Tunnel
- Bohai Strait tunnel
