= Iwate-Ichinohe Tunnel =

Coordinates: 40°05′51.0″N 141°16′04.8″E

- Tunnel profile diagram. (1): Iwate portal. (2): Ichinohe portal.(3) Typical tunnel cross-section.

- Location within Japan

Overview
- Line: Tōhoku Shinkansen
- Status: Active
- Crosses: Ōu Mountains

Operation
- Opened: 1 December 2002

Technical
- Line length: 25,810 m (84,680 ft)

The Iwate-Ichinohe Tunnel (岩手一戸トンネル, Iwate-Ichinohe Ton’neru) is a 25.81 km terrestrial railway tunnel in Japan — part of the Tōhoku Shinkansen, linking Tokyo with Aomori. When opened in 2002 it was the longest in-use terrestrial (land based) tunnel in world, but the title was overtaken by the Lötschberg Base Tunnel in June 2007.

== History ==
Timeline
1988	Surveying commenced
August 1991	Construction commenced
September 2000	Holed through
1 December 2002	Line opened
11 March 2011	Services through tunnel suspended due to earthquake

The tunnel is located 545 km away from Tokyo Station on the Tōhoku Shinkansen line, midway between Morioka and Hachinohe. Surveying commenced in 1988. In 1991 construction began, and the tunnel holed through in 2000. The tunnel became operational when the railway line opened in 2002. Maximum depth is about 200 m.

== Geography and geology ==
The tunnel passes through hilly terrain near the Kitakami and Ōu Mountains. The Mabuchi and Kitakami rivers run near the tunnel's Tokyo portal.

Geology along the tunnel route can be divided into three sections:

- 17 km from the Tokyo end: Mesozoic and Paleozoic strata (argillite, granodiorite, hornfels and chert)
- 5 km central section: Neogene volcanic tuff, which was susceptible to swelling and caused engineering difficulties.
- 4 km from the Aomori end: a combination of the previous two sections, as well as mudstone and andesite of the Neogene period.

Faults cross the path of the tunnel.

== Engineering ==
The tunnel is a single bore twin track design. A horseshoe shape, the cross-sectional dimensions are: 9.8 (width) x 7.7 m (height) (an excavated area of approximately 70 to 85 m^{2}). It rises at a gradient of 0.5% from the Tokyo portal for approximately 22 km, then drops at a gradient of 1% down to the Aomori portal. The New Austrian Tunnelling method (NATM) was adopted to cope with the geology. NATM techniques deployed included rock bolts, shotcrete and steel supports. Excavation methods were dependent on the geology, drill and blast or mechanical excavation and full face or bench cut methods were used. To speed up and reduce the costs of construction the tunnel was divided into seven sections, with intermediate access ramps or inclined shafts.
