= Aki Tunnel =

Railway tunnel in Honshu, Japan

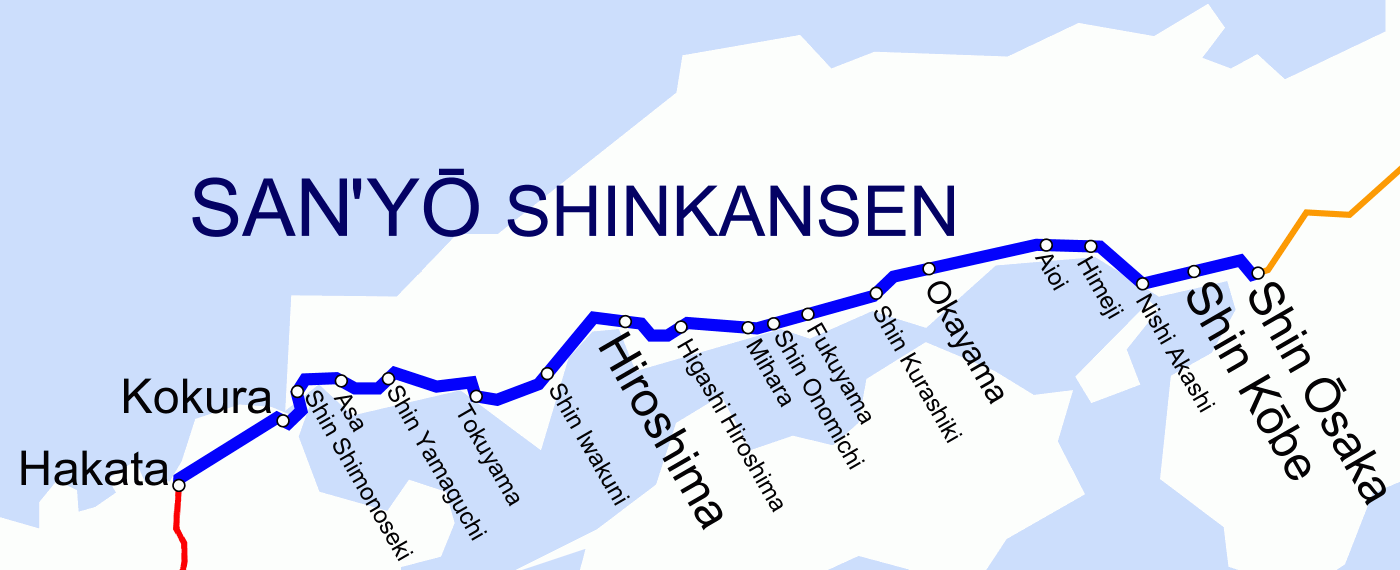
- Aki tunnel on Sanyō Shinkansen line
- Interactive map of Aki Tunnel

Overview
- Line: Sanyō Shinkansen
- Location: between Higashi-Hiroshima Station, Kurose, Hiroshima and Kaita, Hiroshima
- Coordinates: 34°20′35.3004″N 132°39′25.0488″E
- Status: active

Operation
- Opened: 1975
- Operator: West Japan Railway Company
- Traffic: Railway
- Character: Passenger and Freight

Technical
- Line length: 13.030 km (8.096 mi)
- No. of tracks: 2

Aki Tunnel (安芸トンネル) is a tunnel on the West-JR's Sanyō Shinkansen line in Japan that runs from Nomio, Kurose town to Kaita town, Aki district, Hiroshima city in Hiroshima Prefecture with approximate length of 13.030 km. It was completed and opened in 1975.

== See also ==
- List of tunnels in Japan
- Seikan Tunnel Tappi Shakō Line
- Sakhalin–Hokkaido Tunnel
- Bohai Strait tunnel
