= Rokkō Tunnel =

Railway tunnel in Honshu, Japan

Rokko Railway Tunnel
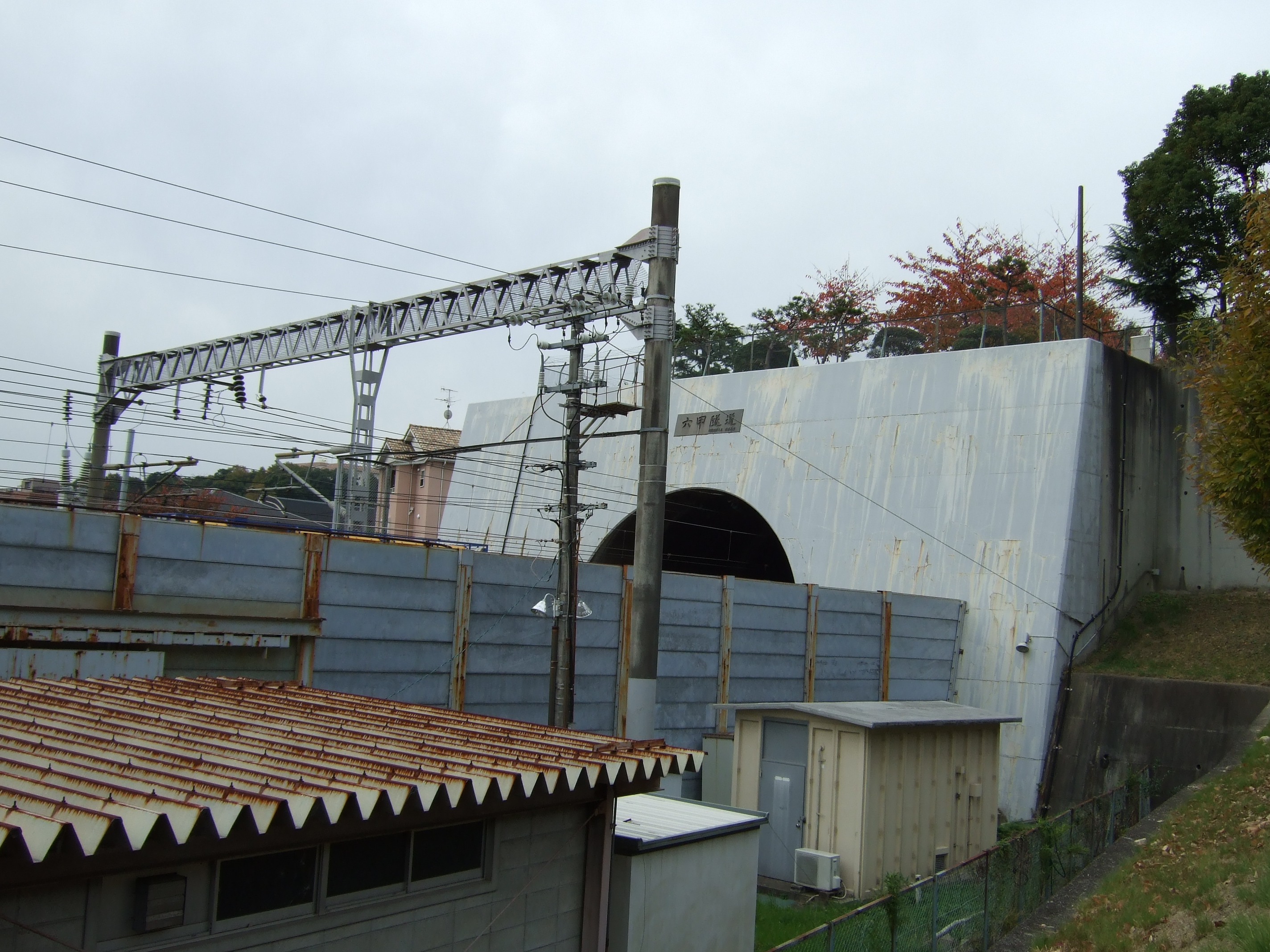
- Rokko Tunnel on Sanyo Shinkansen line
- Interactive map of Rokko Railway Tunnel

Overview
- Line: Sanyo Shinkansen
- Location: Nishinomiya –Kobe City
- Coordinates: 34°43′24.5″N 135°12′51.6″E

Operation
- Opened: 1972
- Operator: West Japan Railway Company
- Character: Passenger and freight

Technical
- Line length: 16,250 m (10.10 mi)

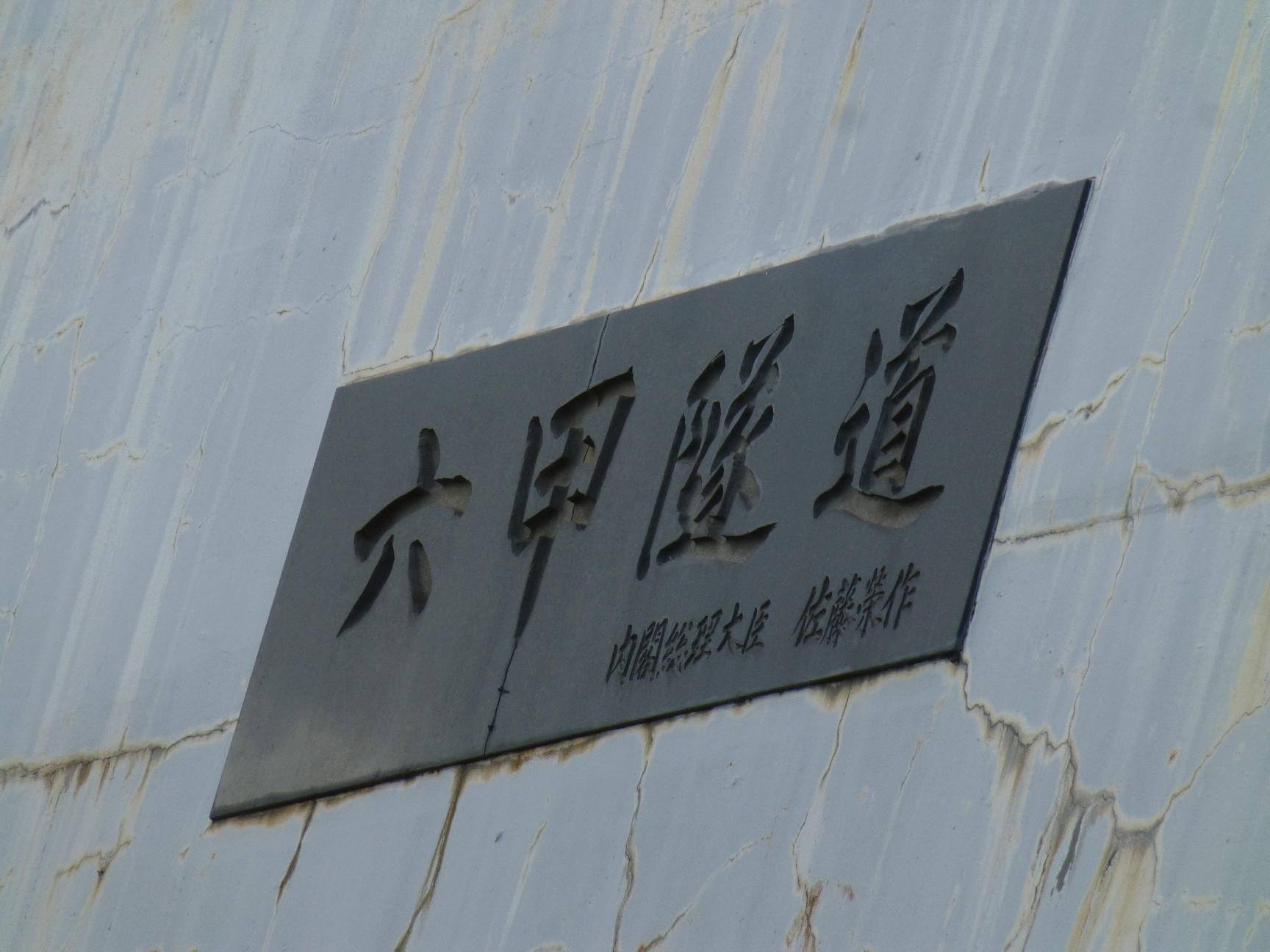
Rokko Tunnel entrance (in Shin-Osaka side), handwritten by Prime Minister Eisaku Sato

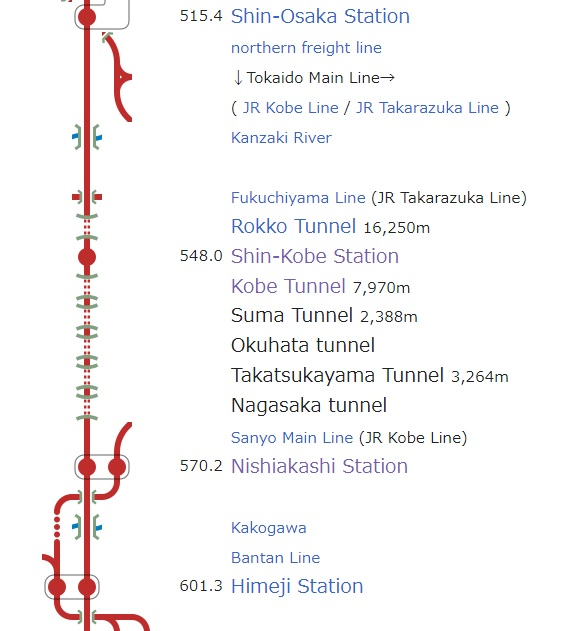
Rokko Tunnel on Sanyo Shinkansen line

Rokko Tunnel (六甲トンネル, ろっこうトンネル, Rokkō tonneru) is a tunnel on the Sanyo Shinkansen in Japan that runs (through Rokko mountain) from Nishinomiya City to Chuo-ku, Kobe City in Hyogo prefecture with approximate length of 16.250 km. It was completed and opened in 1972, and became the longest railway tunnel in Japan and the third longest in the world (after Simplon Tunnel and Apennine Base Tunnel). Up to 2023, the longest railway tunnel in Japan (the second in the world) was Seikan Tunnel with total length of 53.85 km that connects Hokkaido island and Honshu island (undersea).

== See also ==
- List of tunnels in Japan
- Seikan Tunnel Tappi Shakō Line
- Sakhalin–Hokkaido Tunnel
- Bohai Strait tunnel
