= Sotae station =

Metro station in Gwangju, South Korea

101 소태 Sotae
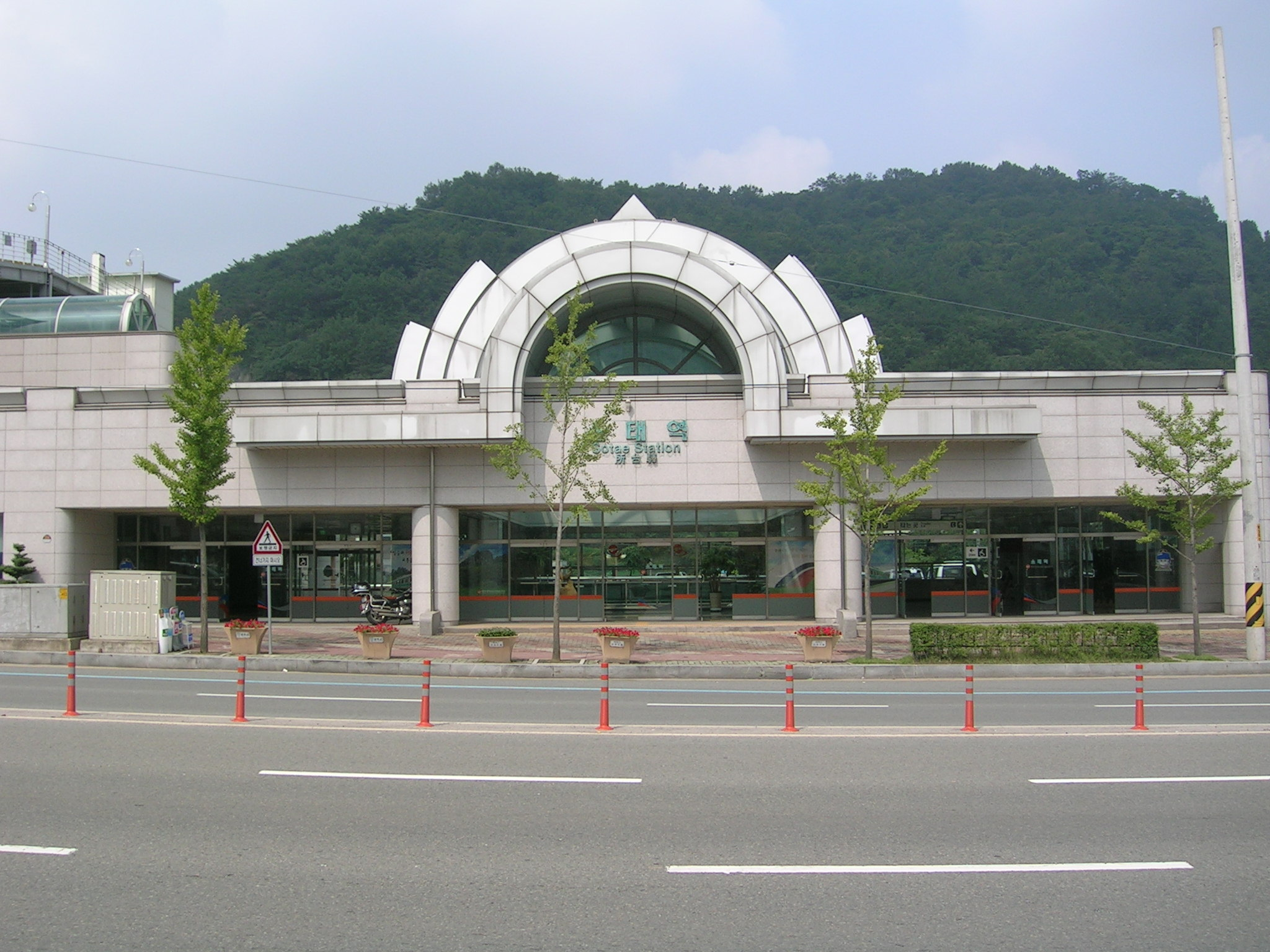

Korean name
- Hangul: 소태역
- Hanja: 所台驛
- Revised Romanization: Sotaeyeok
- McCune–Reischauer: Sot'aeyŏk

General information
- Location: Jiwon 2(i)-dong, Gwangju; South Korea
- Coordinates: 35°07′25″N 126°55′57″E
- Operator: Gwangju Metropolitan Rapid Transit Corporation
- Line: Line 1
- Platforms: 2
- Tracks: 2

Construction
- Structure type: Underground

Other information
- Station code: 101

History
- Opened: April 28, 2004

Services
Preceding station	Gwangju Metro	Following station
Nokdong Terminus	Line 1	Hakdong–Jeungsimsa towards Pyeongdong
Location

Sotae station is a subway station on Gwangju Metro Line 1 in Dong-gu, Gwangju, South Korea. It is named after the Sotae Valley, a large valley of Mudeungsan.

== Design ==
It encompasses a circuit road that reduces traffic congestion caused by heavy traffic volume entering this area from Hwasun, parking lots, and bike parking lots near the station. It is designed to enhance pedestrian safety by securing 3.5–5 meter-wide sidewalks on both sides of the roads.

It is a control station in charge of Hakdong–Jeungsimsa station and Dolgogae station.

== Station layout ==
G	Street Level	Exits
L1	Concourse	Faregates, Ticketing Machines, Station Control
L2; Platforms	Side platform, doors will open on the right
L2; Platforms	Southbound	← Line 1 toward Nokdong or Yongsan Depot (Terminus)
L2; Platforms	Northbound	→ Line 1 toward Pyeongdong (Hakdong·Jeungsimsa) →
L2; Platforms	Side platform, doors will open on the right

== See also ==
- Transportation in South Korea
