= Hokuriku Tunnel =

Railway tunnel in Honshu, Japan

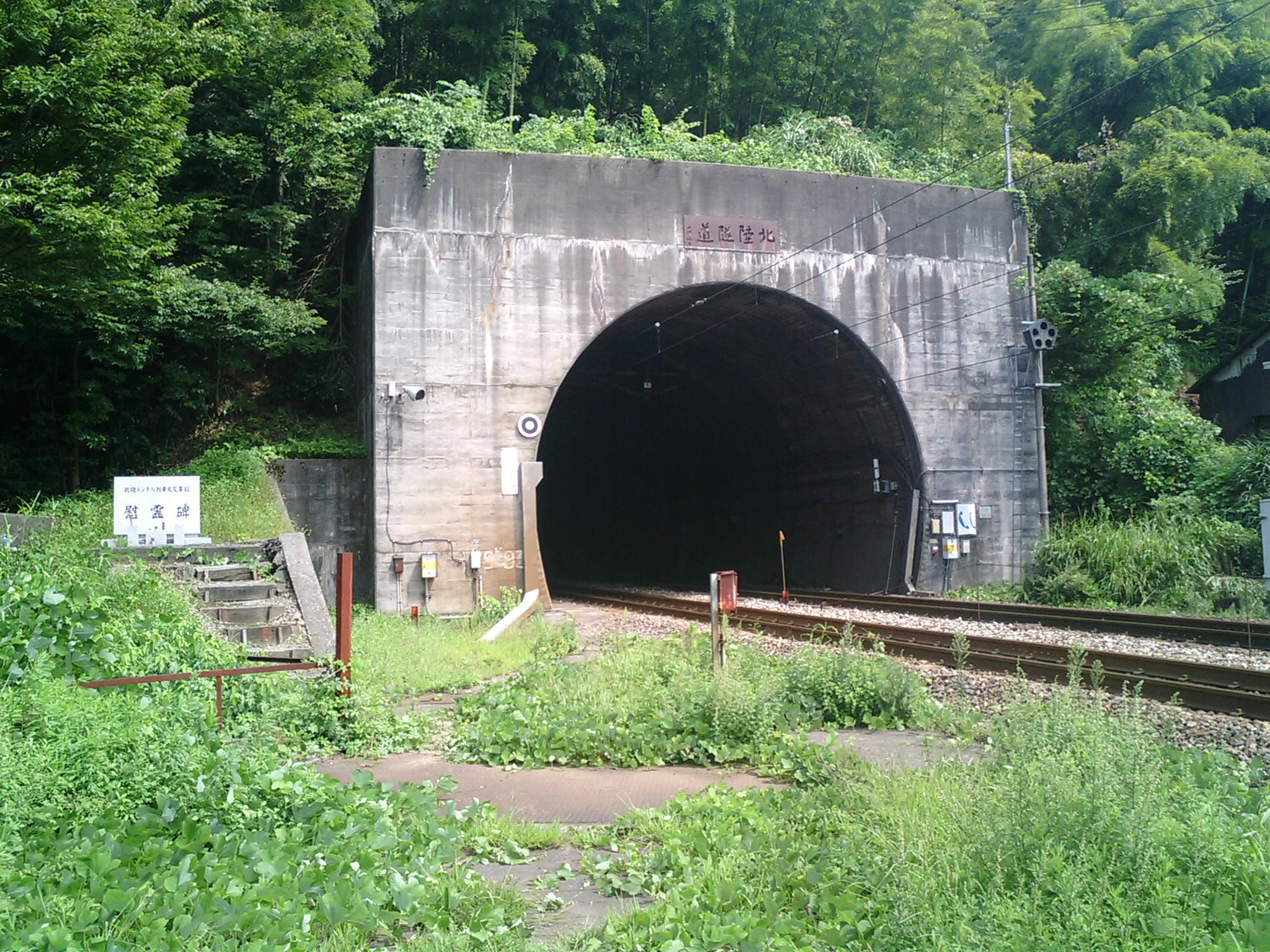
- Hokuriku Tunnel Tsuruga side
- Interactive map of Hokuriku Tunnel

Overview
- Line: Hapi-Line Fukui Line
- Location: between Tsuruga, Fukui and Minami-Imajō Station, Minamiechizen, Fukui
- Coordinates: 35°39′28.2744″N 136°6′41.31″E
- Status: active

Operation
- Opened: 1962
- Operator: Hapi-Line Fukui
- Traffic: Railway
- Character: Passenger and Freight

Technical
- Line length: 13.870 km (8.618 mi)
- No. of tracks: 2

Hokuriku Tunnel (北陸トンネル) is a tunnel on the Hapi-Line Fukui Line (formerly JR-West Hokuriku Main Line) that runs between Tsuruga and Minamiechizen in Fukui Prefecture with approximate length of 13.870 km. It was completed and opened in 1962, and directly below Konome pass, which was the most difficult section of the Hokuriku Main Line.

== See also ==
- List of tunnels in Japan
- Seikan Tunnel Tappi Shakō Line
- Sakhalin–Hokkaido Tunnel
- Bohai Strait tunnel
