= Tortona–Genoa high-speed railway =

Railway project in northern Italy

Overview
- Other name: Third Pass (Terzo Valico)
- Status: Under construction
- Connecting lines: Turin–Genoa
- Website: Official website

Service
- Type: High-speed rail
- System: Trans-European Transport Networks

History
- Commenced: 2013
- Planned opening: 2026

Technical
- Line length: 53 km (33 mi)
- Electrification: 3 kV direct current
- Operating speed: 250 km/h (155 mph)

The Tortona–Genoa high-speed railway, also known as Third Pass (Italian: Terzo Valico), will be a railway in Italy designed for high-speed, high-capacity services linking Genoa to Tortona around 50 kilometres (31 mi) to the north. The railway will form part of the Rhine–Alpine corridor within the Trans-European Transport Networks project.

Construction work started during 2013. As of August 2023, the railway is expected to be completed by 2026. The line will be 53 kilometres (33 mi) long, 36 kilometres (22.4 mi) of which being tunnels. In addition to the line itself, a further 25 kilometres (16 mi) of branches connecting the railway to various existing lines are also planned. The estimated cost for construction of the railway is €6.2 billion.

== Background ==
During the 1990s, the development of a modern high speed railway line between Tortona and Genoa became viewed as an increasingly important pending development for Italy's transport infrastructure. Once completed, it will speed the movement of traffic between the Ligurian coast and Italy's major industrial regions of Piedmont and Lombardy, forming a triangle between the cities of Genoa, Turin, and Milan. Further afield, the railway shall be an element of the wider Trans-European Transport Networks (TEN-T) of high speed railways that will speedily transfer both passengers and freight throughout the European continent, thus boosting international trade between Italy and the rest of Europe by providing a direct route between the ports of Genoa and Rotterdam via the Alps.

The railway will operate at a maximum speed of 250 km/h (155 mph) and has been projected to reduce journey times between Genoa and Milan from 1 hour and 39 minutes today to only 50 minutes. It is believed that a greater proportion of freight from central Europe could be directed to Genoa instead of ports on the North Sea as well, resulting in a decrease in shipping times to Asia of five days. Extensive civil engineering works are involved in the railway's construction: 37 km (23.0 mi) of its 53 km (32.9 mi) length is underground. Several major tunnels are to be built, such as the Colombo, San Tomaso, and Polcevera tunnels, which were at one stage scheduled to be built at a cost of €120m over the course of 30 months.

The Italian railway infrastructure company Rete Ferroviaria Italiana (RFI) functions as the project's client, while the state-owned engineering firm Italferr provides supervision. As a result of a competitive tendering process the COCIV consortium was appointed as the railway's general contractor. It comprises the civil engineering companies Salini-Impregilo (64%), Condotte (31%) and CIV (5%). During September 2003, the final design phase for the railway commenced.

== Construction ==
Construction of the line commenced in April 2012. As part of preparatory work ahead of construction, roughly 30 km (19 mi) of roads were constructed or upgraded to accommodate heavy goods vehicles involved in the construction as well as to ease general traffic flows. The construction activity was divided into six separate lots, the first two of which were activated in advance of the remaining four lots.

During July 2015, it was announced that the excavation of the Campasso Tunnel had been completed. This 600-metre-long (2,000 ft) tunnel was a key engineering element of Lot 1 and facilitates a connection between the new railway and the historic Succursale dei Giovi (Genoa-Milan-Turin route) line. The railway's tunnels are typically built as a pair of single-track tunnels adjoined by cross-connections. However, during mid 2018, construction of the Tortona–Genoa high-speed railway was suspended for two years, reportedly due to a contractual dispute.

On 21 July 2020, tunneling work was resumed as a result of a new contract having been signed between Rete Ferroviaria Italiana (RFI) and the COCIV consortium in regards to both design and construction activities for the railway. Around the same time, further contracts were also issued to the Cociv consortium to build several connections between the new high speed railway and existing lines at Voltri, Genoa Parco Campo, and Tortona.

By July 2020, the Tortona–Genoa high-speed railway was reportedly 40 percent complete. During late September 2020, breakthroughs were achieved in both the Valico tunnel (Galleria di Valico) and the Serravalle tunnel (Galleria dei Serravalle); as a consequence, every work sites was directly connected to one another along a 17 km (11 mi) stretch. The 27.3 km-long (17.0 mi) Valico tunnel was excavated using traditional techniques, while the vast majority of the 7 km (4.3 mi) Serravalle tunnel was driven via a tunnel boring machine (TBM). Webuild hailed the twin breakthroughs as being the halfway point on all of the route's excavations.

== See also ==
- High-speed rail in Italy
