= Dahuofang Water Tunnel =

Chinese aqueduct in Liaoning Province

The Dahuofang Water Tunnel (Chinese: 大伙房输水工程引水隧道), located in Liaoning Province, China is an 85.3-kilometer (53.0 mi) tunnel eight meters in diameter which provides water from the Dahuofang Reservoir to the cities of Shenyang, Fushun, Liaoyang, Anshan, Panjin, Yingkou, and Dalian. As of 2014, it is the third longest tunnel in the world. Boring of the tunnel began in September 2006, was completed in April 2009, and cost 5.2 billion yuan (about $750 million).

== See also ==
- South–North Water Transfer Project
