= Şanlıurfa Irrigation Tunnels =

Irrigation tunnels in Şanlıurfa, Turkey

Şanlıurfa Irrigation tunnels is the name of a major irrigation tunnel constructed in connection with the Southeastern Anatolia Project, a multi-sector integrated regional development project of Turkey. The tunnels were commissioned by the State Hydraulic Works authority (DSİ). The constructor was Eren İnşaat. The construction ended by 19 December 2005 and the tunnels were put into service.

== Technical details ==
The tunnels run in the Şanlıurfa Province of Turkey. The water supply is the water reservoir of Atatürk Dam on Fırat River (Euphrates). There are two parallel tunnels, the length of each being 26.4 kilometres (16.4 mi). The outer diameter of each tunnel is 9.5 metres (31 ft) and the inner diameter is 7.62 metres (25.0 ft). The flow rate is 328 m^{3}/s (11,600 cu ft/s) With these figures, the tunnels are the largest in the world, in terms of length and flow rate.

== Service ==
The total agricultural land which benefits from irrigation is 476,474 hectares (1,177,390 acres), 358,000 hectares (880,000 acres) by free flow and the rest by pumping. It is reported that the agricultural productivity has since been tripled.

== List of 50 Projects ==
Turkish Chamber of Civil Engineers lists Şanlıurfa Irrigation Tunnels as one of the fifty civil engineering feats in Turkey, a list of remarkable engineering projects realized in the first 50 years of the chamber.
