= G0711 Ürümqi–Ruoqiang Expressway =

Road in China

Ürümqi–Ruoqiang Expressway
- 乌鲁木齐－若羌高速公路
- Wuruo Expressway 乌若高速公路

Route information
- Auxiliary route of G7

Major junctions
- North end: G3003 in Saybag District, Ürümqi, Xinjiang
- South end: G0612 in Ruoqiang County, Bayingolin Mongol Autonomous Prefecture, Xinjiang

Location
- Country: China

Highway system
- National Trunk Highway System; Primary; Auxiliary; National Highways; Transport in China
← G7	→ G0712

The G0711 Ürümqi–Ruoqiang Expressway (Chinese: 乌鲁木齐至若羌高速公路), also referred to as the Wuruo Expressway (Chinese: 乌若高速公路), is an expressway in Xinjiang, China that connects Ürümqi to Ruoqiang County. It uses the Tianshan Shengli Tunnel, opened to traffic in 26 December, 2025, which is the longest expressway tunnel in the world, with more than 22 km under the Tian Shan mountains.

== Route ==
The expressway starts in Saybag District, Ürümqi, then passes through Korla and Yuli County along the eastern part of the Taklimakan Desert to Ruoqiang County.
