= Zhongnanshan Tunnel =

Road tunnel in Shaanxi, China

Coordinates: 33°53′N 108°58′E

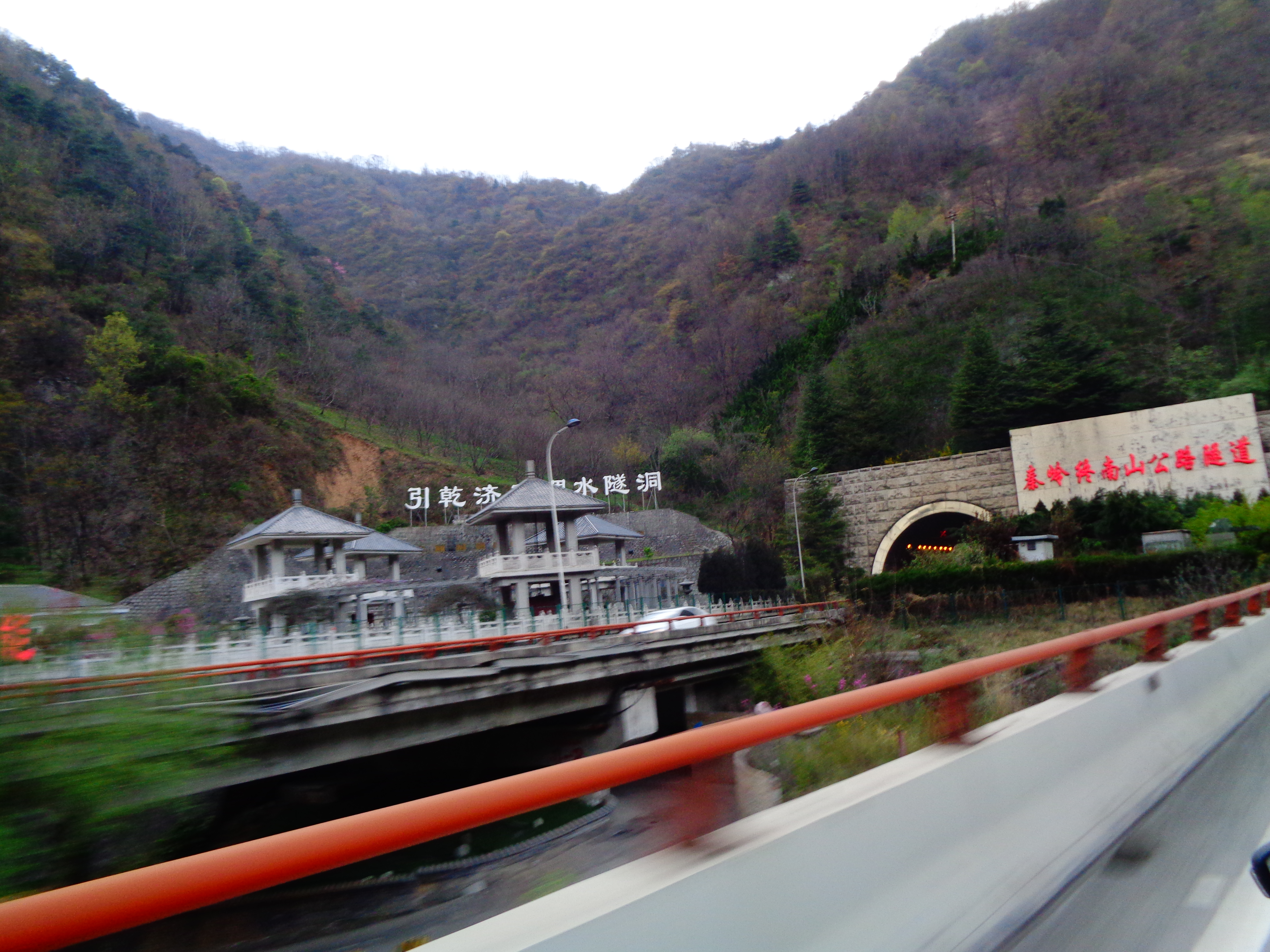
- Interactive map of Zhongnanshan Tunnel

Overview
- Location: Qinling Mountains, Shaanxi
- Status: Active
- Route: G65 Baotou–Maoming Expressway
- Start: Chang'an District, Xi'an
- End: Zhashui County, Shangluo

Operation
- Work began: March 2002
- Opened: 22 December 2007

Technical
- Length: 18.040 km (11.210 mi)
- No. of lanes: Two in each tunnel
- Operating speed: Speed limit: 80 km/h (50 mph)
- Max elevation: 1026m
- Min elevation: 896m
- Width: 10.9 m (36 ft)
- Grade: 1.1%

Zhongnanshan Tunnel, or Qinling Zhongnanshan Tunnel (Chinese: 秦岭终南山公路隧道) in Shaanxi province, China, is the longest two-tube road tunnel in China. It is also the fifth longest road tunnel in the world, after the Lærdal Tunnel in Norway, WestConnex in Australia, the Tianshan Shengli Tunnel in China and the Yamate Tunnel in Japan. (Note: 1. Lærdal Tunnel (24.5 km (15.2 mi)); 2. WestConnex (22.4 km (13.9 mi)); 3. Tianshan Shengli Tunnel (22.1 km (13.8 mi)); 4. Yamate Tunnel (18.2 km (11.3 mi)))

The 18,040-metre (11.21 mi) long tunnel, crosses under the Zhongnan Mountains (Zhongnanshan). It opened on 20 January 2007, becoming part of the Xi'an-Ankang Highway between Chang'an and Zhashui. The cost to build the tunnel was 3.2 billion yuan (US$410 million). The maximum embedded depth of the tunnel is 1640 metres below surface level.
