= Oshima Tunnel =

Railway tunnel in Japan

Coordinates: 41°54′27″N 140°38′8″E

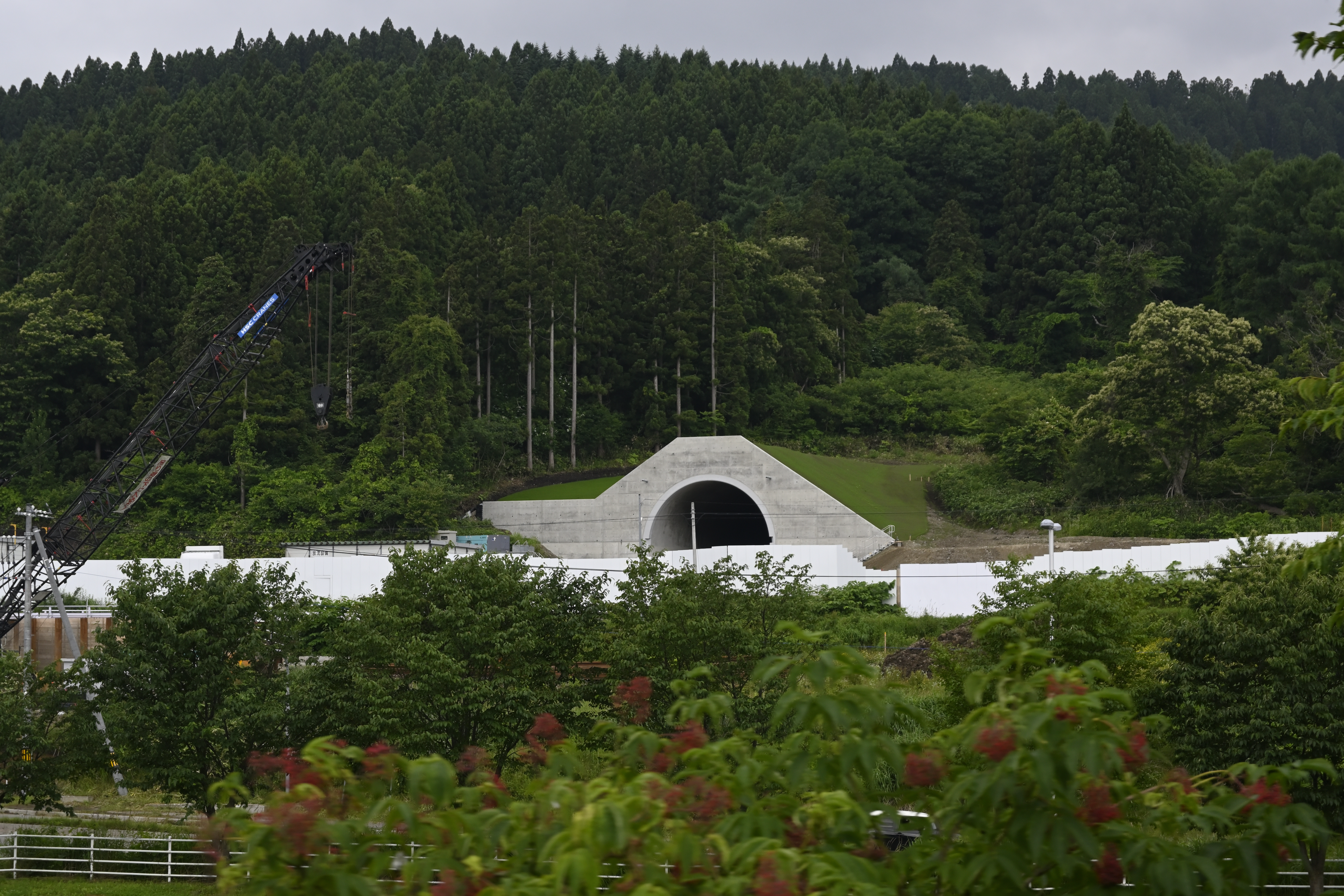
- Hokuto, south portal
- Interactive map of Oshima Tunnel

Overview
- Official name: Japanese: 渡島トンネル
- Line: Hokkaido Shinkansen
- Location: Japan (Hokkaido)
- System: Shinkansen
- Start: Hokuto
- End: Yakumo

Operation
- Work began: November 2016
- Owner: JR Hokkaido
- Traffic: Shinkansen
- Character: Passenger

Technical
- Length: 32.675 km (20.303 mi)
- No. of tracks: 1 double-track tube
- Track gauge: 1,435 mm (4 ft 8 1/2 in)
- Electrified: 25 kV AC, 50 Hz, overhead catenary
- Operating speed: Maximum speed: 260 km/h (160 mph)

The Oshima Tunnel (渡島トンネル, Oshima tonneru) is a 32.675-kilometer-long (20.303 mi) railway tunnel that is under construction in southern Hokkaido. It will link the city of Hokuto with the town of Yakumo.

The Oshima Tunnel will be a part of the Hokkaido Shinkansen, located between its current northern terminus at Shin-Hakodate-Hokuto Station and the planned Shin-Yakumo Station. Drilling began in 2016 and is set to finish in 2024. Upon its completion it will surpass the Hakkōda Tunnel in Aomori Prefecture as the longest terrestrial tunnel in Japan.
