= Min Hyung-bae =

Mayor of Jeonnam-Gwangju since 2026

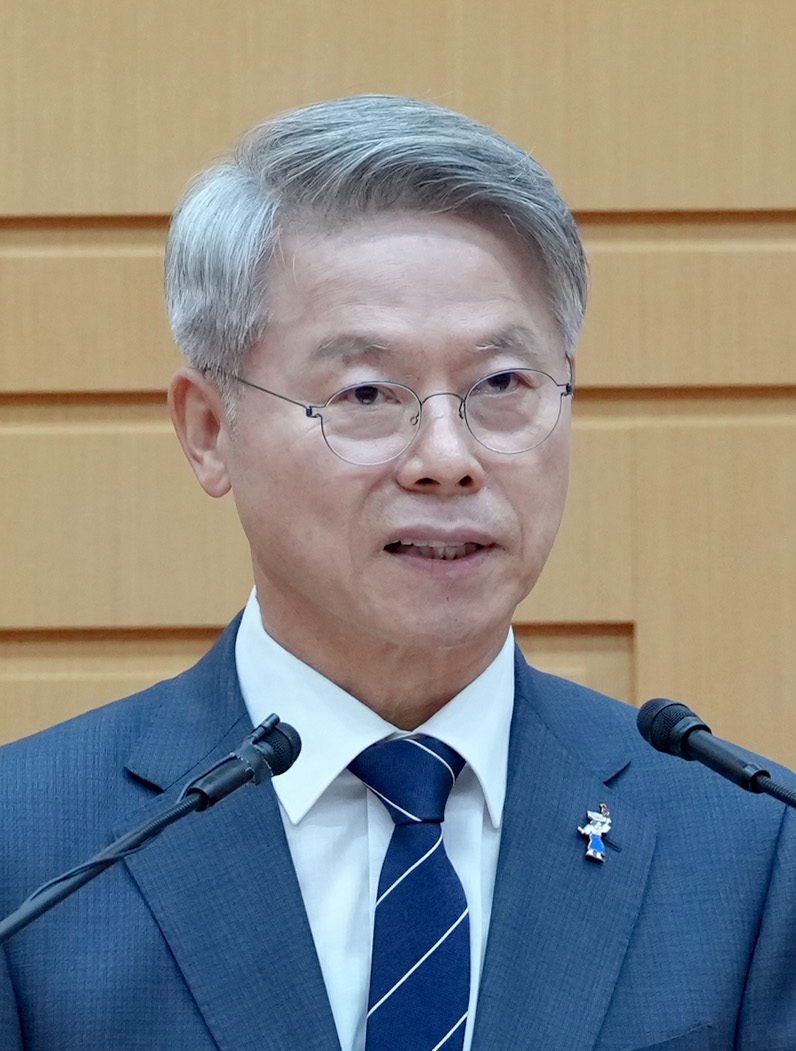
- Min in 2026

Mayor of Jeonnam-Gwangju
- Incumbent
- Assumed office 1 July 2026
- Preceded by: Kim Yung-rok (as Governor of South Jeolla Province); Kang Gi-jung (as Mayor of Gwangju)

Member of the National Assembly
- In office 30 May 2020 – 29 April 2026

Mayor of Gwangsan District
- In office 1 July 2010 – 7 March 2018

Personal details
- Born: 15 June 1961 (age 65) Haenam County, South Jeolla Province, South Korea
- Party: Democratic Party of Korea

Min Hyung-bae (Korean: 민형배; born 15 June 1961) is a South Korean politician who has served as the Mayor of Jeonnam-Gwangju since 2026. A member of the Democratic Party of Korea (DPK), he served as the district mayor of the Gwangsan from 2010 to 2018 and as a member of the National Assembly from 2020 to 2026.

Min was born on 15 June 1961 in Haenam County, South Jeolla Province, South Korea. He graduated from Mokpo High School. He received a masters degree and PhD from Chonnam National University.

Min was the mayor of the Gwangsan from 2010 to 2018. He was elected for two terms in the National Assembly, after first being elected in 2020. Min resigned from his seat in the National Assembly to become one of Gwangju's mayoral candidates.

Park Jie-won originally served as the fundraising committee chairman for Min's campaign for the Gwangju mayorship. However, Democratic Party of Korea rules prevented sitting lawmakers from holding campaign positions, which led Park to resign from his role as fundraising committee chair. Park's office explained that they were unaware that the rule applied to fundraising chairmen, and Min's campaign admitted to being unfamiliar with the rule.

In the first integrated mayoral election for Jeonnam–Gwangju during the 2026 South Korean local elections, Min secured a majority of the votes, defeating People Power Party candidate Lee Jung-hyun.

== Election results ==
=== General elections ===
Year	Elections	Constituency	Political party	Votes (%)	Results
2020	21st National Assembly General Election	Gwangsan B (Gwangju)	Democratic (2015)	96,808 (84.05%)	Won
2024	22nd National Assembly General Election	Gwangsan B (Gwangju)	Democratic (2015)	94,733 (76.09%)	Won

=== Local elections ===
==== Mayor of Jeonnam-Gwangju ====
Year	Elections	Constituency	Political party	Votes (%)	Remarks
2026	9th Iocal Election	Jeonnam-Gwangju (Mayoral Elections)	Democratic (2015)	1,283,402 (79.01%)	Won

==== Mayor of Gwangju Gwangsan ====
Year	Elections	Constituency	Political party	Votes (%)	Remarks
2010	5th Iocal Election	Mayor of Gwangju Gwangsan	Democratic (2008)	63,543 (55.04%)	Won
2014	6th Iocal Election	Mayor of Gwangju Gwangsan	NPAD	127,437 (88.36%)	Won
