= Cheondeungsan =

Cheondeungsan may refer to:

- Cheondeungsan (North Chungcheong)
- Cheondeungsan (North Gyeongsang)
- Cheondeungsan (North Jeolla)
- Cheondeungsan (South Jeolla)
