= Gwangsan B =

Constituency in Gwangju, South Korea

- Single-member constituency for the National Assembly
- Location of the constituency
- District(s): Gwangsan District (part)
- Region: Gwangju
- Electorate: 186,787 (2024)

Current constituency
- Created: 2008
- Seats: 1
- Party: Democratic Party
- Member: Lim Mun-yeong
- Created from: Gwangsan

Gwangsan B (Korean: 광산구 을) is a constituency of the National Assembly of South Korea. The constituency consists of parts of Gwangsan District, Gwangju. As of 2024, 186,787 eligible voters were registered in the constituency. The constituency was created in 2008 from the Gwangsan constituency.

== History ==
Gwangsan B, like all other constituencies located in Gwangju and the Honam region, is considered as a stronghold for the liberal Democratic Party. The constituency has voted for candidates of the Democratic Party and its predecessor parties in every election except for in 2016.

Lee Yong-seop of the United Democratic Party was the first member to represent the constituency winning in a landslide with 73.16% of the vote. Lee won-re-election in 2012 with 74.67% of the vote against Hwang Cha-eun of the Unified Progressive Party. However, Lee resigned from the National Assembly on May 7, 2014, in order to run as an independent candidate for Mayor of Gwangju in the upcoming local elections. Kwon Eun-hee of the centrist-liberal New Politics Alliance for Democracy (NPAD) won the by-election for the constituency, securing 60.6% of the vote. In the aftermath of the NPAD party split, incumbent Kwon Eun-hee along with other influential Honam politicians joined the People Party led by Ahn Cheol-soo. Despite Gwangsan B and the region's historical preference for candidates of the Democratic Party, Kwon won re-election as a member of the People Party in the 2016 election. Kwon did not stand for re-election in the 2020 election. She was succeeded by Min Hyung-bae of the Democratic Party who won in a landslide with 84.05% of the vote. Min won re-election in 2024 against former Prime Minister of South Korea Lee Nak-yon of the New Future Party.

== Boundaries ==
The constituency encompasses the neighborhoods of Cheomdan 1-dong, Cheomdan 2-dong, Bia-dong, Singa-dong, Sinchang-dong, Suwan-dong, Hanam-dong, and Imgok-dong.

== List of members of the National Assembly ==
Election	Member	Party	Dates	Notes
2008	Lee Yong-seop	United Democratic	2008–2014	Commissioner of Korea Customs Service (2002–2003); Commissioner of National Tax Service (2003–2005); Senior Secretary for Innovation Administration (2005–2006); Minister of the Interior (2006); Minister of Construction and Transportation (2006-2008); Resigned on May 7, 2014 to run for Mayor of Gwangju; Mayor of Gwangju (2018–2022)
2012	Lee Yong-seop	Democratic United	2008–2014	Commissioner of Korea Customs Service (2002–2003); Commissioner of National Tax Service (2003–2005); Senior Secretary for Innovation Administration (2005–2006); Minister of the Interior (2006); Minister of Construction and Transportation (2006-2008); Resigned on May 7, 2014 to run for Mayor of Gwangju; Mayor of Gwangju (2018–2022)
2014 by-election	Kwon Eun-hee	NPAD	2014–2020	Left the New Politics Alliance for Democracy (NPAD) on December 28, 2015 Joined the People Party on January 11, 2016
2016	Kwon Eun-hee	People	2014–2020	Left the New Politics Alliance for Democracy (NPAD) on December 28, 2015 Joined the People Party on January 11, 2016
2020	Min Hyung-bae	Democratic	2020–2026	Secretary of the Office of the President (2003–2006); Third Secretary for Society Adjustment (2006–2007); Mayor of Gwangsan (2010–2018); Secretary for the Autonomy Expansion (2018–2019); Secretary for the Social Policy (2019); Resigned on April 29, 2026 to run for Mayor-elect of Jeonnam–Gwangju; Mayor-elect of Jeonnam–Gwangju (2026–)
2024	Min Hyung-bae	Democratic	2020–2026	Secretary of the Office of the President (2003–2006); Third Secretary for Society Adjustment (2006–2007); Mayor of Gwangsan (2010–2018); Secretary for the Autonomy Expansion (2018–2019); Secretary for the Social Policy (2019); Resigned on April 29, 2026 to run for Mayor-elect of Jeonnam–Gwangju; Mayor-elect of Jeonnam–Gwangju (2026–)
2026 by-election	Lim Mun-yeong	Democratic	2026–2028	Chairman of the Presidential Council on National Artificial Intelligence Strategy (2025–2026)

== Election results ==
=== 2024 ===
Legislative Election 2024: Gwangsan B
Party	Candidate	Votes	%	±%
Democratic	Min Hyung-bae	94,733	76.09	▼7.96
New Future	Lee Nak-yon	17,237	13.84	new
People Power	Ahn Tae-wook	5,941	4.77	new
Progressive	Jeon Ju-yeon	5,110	4.10	new
Green Justice	Kim Yong-jae	1,471	1.18	new
Rejected ballots		1,146	–	
Turnout		125,638	67.26	▲3.18
Registered electors		186,787		
Democratic hold		Swing		

=== 2020 ===
Legislative Election 2020: Gwangsan B
Party	Candidate	Votes	%	±%
Democratic	Min Hyung-bae	96,808	84.05	▲40.8
Minsaeng	Noh Seung-il	8,606	7.47	▼42.67
Justice	Kim Yong-jae	7,110	6.17	▲3.82
Labor	Lee Byung-hoon	1,407	1.22	new
National Revolutionary	Kim Hong-seop	1,241	1.07	new
Rejected ballots		1,965	–	
Turnout		117,137	64.08	▲2.42
Registered electors		182,793		
Democratic gain from People		Swing		

=== 2016 ===
Legislative Election 2016: Gwangsan B
Party	Candidate	Votes	%	±%
People	Kwon Eun-hee	50,724	50.14	new
Democratic	Lee Yong-seop	43,749	43.25	▼17.36
Justice	Moon Jeong-eun	2,380	2.35	▼1.42
Saenuri	Sim Jeong-woo	1,940	1.91	▼5.07
People's United	Choi Kyung-mee	1,654	1.63	new
Independent	Han Nam-sook	703	0.69	new
Rejected ballots		618	–	
Turnout		101,768	61.66	▲39.35
Registered electors		165,038		
People hold		Swing		

=== 2014 by-election ===
2014 by-election: Gwangsan B
Party	Candidate	Votes	%	±%
NPAD	Kwon Eun-hee	21,545	60.61	▼14.06
Unified Progressive	Chang Wan-seop	9,375	26.37	▲1.02
Saenuri	Song Hwan-ki	2,484	6.98	new
Justice	Moon Jeong-eun	1,343	3.77	new
Independent	Yang Cheong-seok	799	2.24	new
Rejected ballots		137	–	
Turnout		35,683	22.31	▼28.87
Registered electors		159,974		
NPAD hold		Swing		

=== 2012 ===
Legislative Election 2012: Gwangsan B
Party	Candidate	Votes	%	±%
Democratic United	Lee Yong-seop	53,154	74.67	▲1.51
Unified Progressive	Hwang Cha-eun	18,022	25.32	▲7.45
Rejected ballots		822	–	
Turnout		71,998	51.18	▲10.12
Registered electors		140,667		
Democratic United hold		Swing		

=== 2008 ===
Legislative Election 2008: Gwangsan B
Party	Candidate	Votes	%	±%
United Democratic	Lee Yong-seop	26,540	73.16	–
Democratic Labor	Jang Yeun-ju	6,482	17.87	–
Grand National	Kang Kyung-soo	2,608	7.19	–
Family Party for Peace and Unity	Kim Kyong-ok	648	1.79	–
Rejected ballots		266	–	
Turnout		36,544	41.06	–
Registered electors		88,999		
United Democratic win (new seat)				

== See also ==
- List of constituencies of the National Assembly of South Korea
