= Sambongsan =

Sambongsan may refer to:

- Sambongsan (South Geongsang/South Jeolla), a mountain in South Korea
- Sambongsan (Chungcheongbuk-do), a mountain in South Korea
- Sambongsan (Geochang), a mountain in South Korea
