= Baegamsan =

Baegamsan may refer to:

- Baegamsan (Gangwon), a mountain in South Korea's Gangwon Province
- Baegamsan (North Gyeongsang), a mountain in South Korea's North Gyeongsang Province
- Baegamsan (Jeolla), a mountain on the border of South Korea's North Jeolla and South Jeolla Provinces
