= Lee Yong-seop =

South Korean public servant and politician

- 이용섭
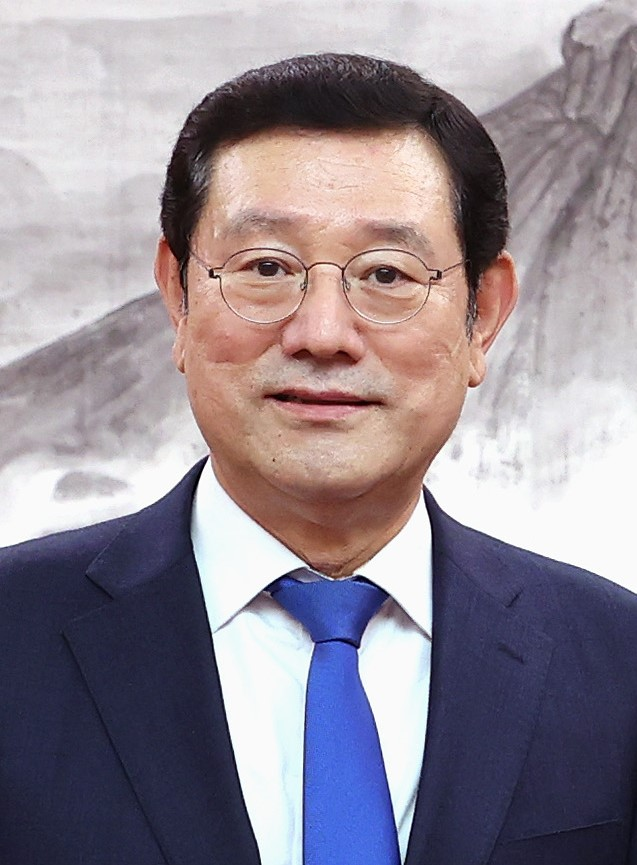

Mayor of Gwangju
- In office 1 July 2018 – 30 June 2022
- Preceded by: Yoon Jang-hyun
- Succeeded by: Kang Gi-jung

Member of the National Assembly
- In office 30 May 2008 – 15 May 2014
- Preceded by: Kim Dong-cheol
- Succeeded by: Kwon Eun-hee
- Constituency: Gwangsan B (Gwangju)

Minister of Construction and Transportation
- In office 11 December 2006 – 29 February 2008
- President: Roh Moo-hyun
- Preceded by: Choo Byung-jik
- Succeeded by: Chung Jong-hwan

Minister of the Interior
- In office 27 March 2006 – 4 December 2006
- President: Roh Moo-hyun
- Preceded by: Oh Young-gyo
- Succeeded by: Park Myung-jae

Personal details
- Born: 11 September 1951 (age 75) Hampyeong, South Jeolla Province, South Korea
- Party: Democratic
- Education: Chonnam National University (BA); University of Michigan (MA); Sungkyunkwan University (PhD)

Korean name
- Hangul: 이용섭
- Hanja: 李庸燮
- RR: I Yongseop
- MR: I Yongsŏp

Lee Yong-seop (Korean: 이용섭; born 11 September 1951) is a South Korean public servant and politician who served as a member of the National Assembly from 2008 to 2014 and as the mayor of Gwangju from 2018 to 2022.

Lee received his B.A. in Trade from Chonnam National University in 1974.

== Election results ==
=== General elections ===
Year	Elections	Constituency	Political party	Votes (%)	Results
2008	18th National Assembly General Election	Gwangsan B (Gwangju)	UDP	26,540 (73.15%)	Won
2012	19th National Assembly General Election	Gwangsan B (Gwangju)	DUP	53,154 (74.67%)	Won
2016	20th National Assembly General Election	Gwangsan B (Gwangju)	Democratic	43,749 (43.25%)	Defeated (2nd)

=== Local elections ===
==== Mayor of Gwangju ====
Year	Elections	Constituency	Political party	Votes (%)	Remarks
2014	6th Iocal Election	Gwangju (Mayoral Elections)	Independent	-	Resigned
2018	7th Iocal Election	Gwangju (Mayoral Elections)	Democratic	573,995 (83.06%)	Won
