= Gwangju Castle =

Former castle in Gwangju, Korea

Coordinates: 35°09′N 126°55′E

Gwangju Castle (Korean: 광주읍성; Hanja: 光州邑城) was a Joseon-period castle in Gwangju, Korea (present-day South Korea). According to the Gwangju Eupji (광주읍지; 光州邑誌) published in 1879, it was made of stone. It was 8253 in circumference and 9 (m?) in height.

== Design ==
The castle had four gates: Seowon Gate on the east side, Gwangni Gate on the west, Jinnam Gate on the south and Gongbuk Gate on the north.

== History ==
The first record of Gwangju Castle appears in the geography of Sejong Shilok, where it says 'Castle is built, it has a circumference of 972 steps', but no specific information (such as when the building was built) was given. However, because the fortress was built in Naju and Boseong in preparation for the invasion of the Joseon dynasty, the city of Gwangju is presumed to have been built in the early 15th century.

=== Destruction ===
After the Korean Empire was established in 1897, Gwangju began to modernize. The government-owned buildings located in Gwangju during the period were used as post offices (passway through Seomun Tongan) and hospitals (Seo Gi-cheong). The Gwangju City Wall, which is believed to have been the center of Gwangju for at least 500 years, gradually disappeared. Most think that the Government-General of Korea began to demolish the wall in 1907, but some believe it had collapsed before that.

The Hwangsŏng Shinmun, published on January 23, 1910, right before the Korea-Japan bombing, reported, "An observer of the province has filed an internal petition for the use of civil materials that tore up the walls and gate of Gwangju." Numerous buildings in Gwangju Castle are believed to have been dismantled by the Japanese during this period.

== Symbolism ==
Although nothing remains of Gwangju Castle, a reproduction of its stone wall is located at the National Asian Culture Hall in Gyeongju. This stone wall is a replica of the Jinnam Gate, the former south gate. The 999-kan, one of the Gwangju Folly, was originally located in Gongbuk-mun, a north gate, and the piece replaces the gate. The gate-shaped sculpture located in front of the old back gate of Jeonnam Girls' High School symbolizes Seowon Gate, the same gate. It is meant to symbolically receive the auspicious energy of the east. Gwangrimun Gate, the preface to the location of the work "Currentization of Memory," is located in the middle of the Colbox intersection floor. The work appears to name the four gates along the outline of Castle. The word Gwangnimun means "to wish for all kinds of things" and "to the west of Gwangju and Gwangsan".
