= Kang Gi-jung =

South Korena politician (born 1964)

- 강기정
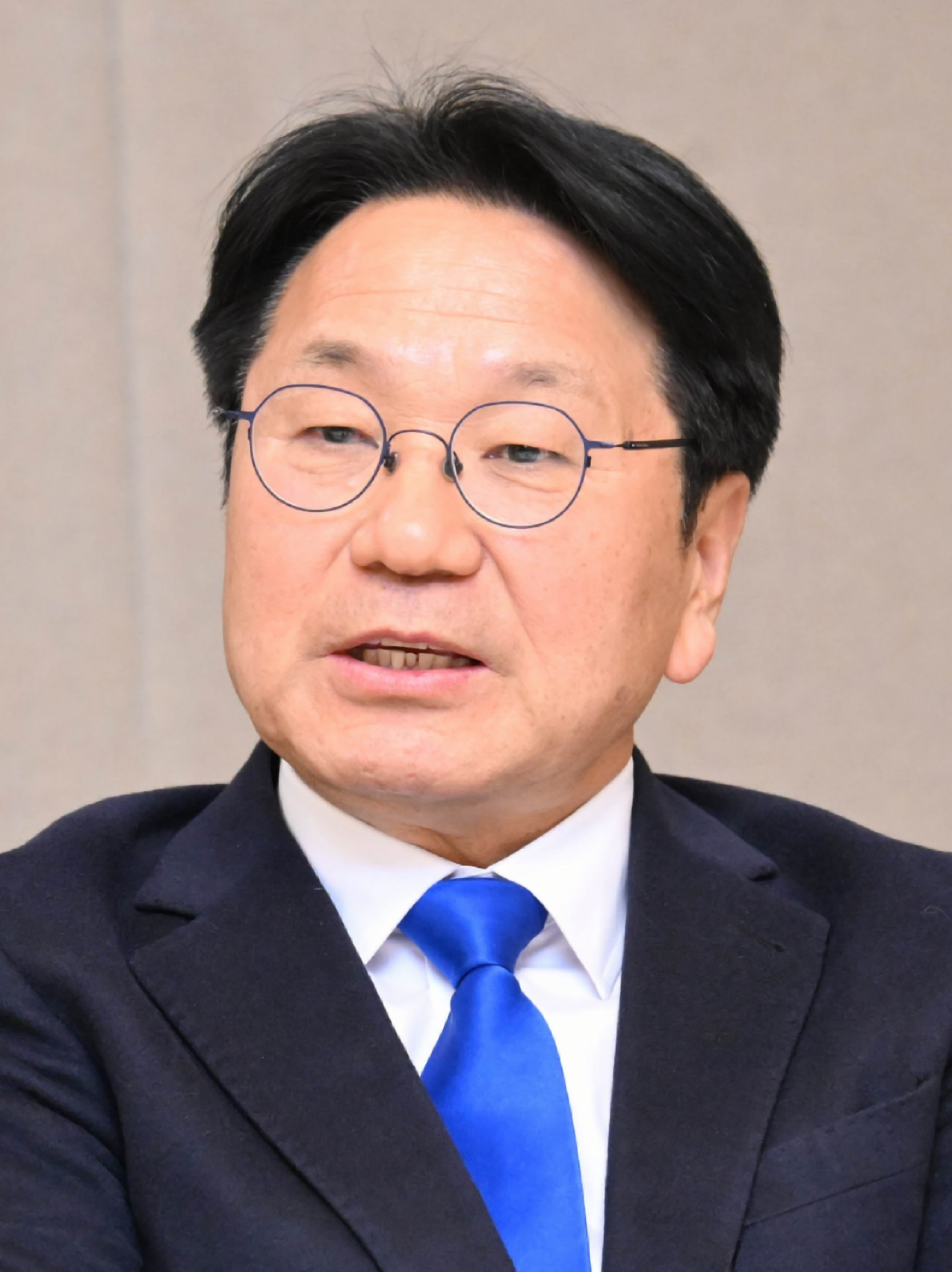
- Jung in 2025

14th Mayor of Gwangju
- In office 1 July 2022 – 30 June 2026
- Preceded by: Lee Yong-seop
- Succeeded by: Min Hyung-bae (as Mayor of Jeonnam-Gwangju)

Senior Secretary to the President for Political Affairs
- In office 8 January 2019 – 10 August 2020
- President: Moon Jae-in

Member of the National Assembly
- In office 30 May 2004 – 29 May 2016
- Constituency: Buk A (Gwangju)

Personal details
- Born: December 3, 1964 (age 61) Goheung County, South Korea
- Party: Democratic Party of Korea
- Education: Chonnam National University (BS, MA)

Kang Gi-jung (Korean: 강기정; born December 3, 1964) is a South Korean politician who served as the mayor of Gwangju from 2022 to 2026. A member of the Democratic Party of Korea, he previously served as a three-term member of the National Assembly and as a senior presidential aide.

== Early life and education ==
Kang Gi-jung was born in Goheung, South Jeolla Province on December 3, 1964. He attended Chonnam National University, where he earned a Bachelor of Science in Electrical Engineering. He later obtained a Master's degree in Public Administration from the same institution.

== Election results ==
=== General elections ===
Year	Elections	Constituency	Political party	Votes (%)	Results
2000	16th National Assembly General Election	Buk A (Gwangju)	Independent	15,606 (19.91%)	Defeated (2nd)
2002	2002 By-election	Buk A (Gwangju)	Independent	6,047 (18.13%)	Defeated (3rd)
2004	17th National Assembly General Election	Buk A (Gwangju)	Uri	51,258 (59.82%)	Won
2008	18th National Assembly General Election	Buk A (Gwangju)	UDP	36,656 (63.28%)	Won
2012	19th National Assembly General Election	Buk A (Gwangju)	DUP	37,718 (57.72%)	Won

=== Local elections ===
==== Mayor of Gwangju ====
Year	Elections	Constituency	Political party	Votes (%)	Remarks
2022	8th Iocal Election	Gwangju (Mayoral Elections)	Democratic	334,699 (74.91%)	Won

== Political career ==
Jung entered national politics in 2004 and served as a three-term member of the National Assembly (17th, 18th, and 19th), representing the Buk District of Gwangju. During his tenure, he held roles including the Executive Secretary of the Health and Welfare Committee and the Chairman of the National Assembly's Special Committee on Ethics.

In January 2019, President Moon Jae-in appointed Jung as the Senior Secretary for Political Affairs. In this role, he was tasked with facilitating communication between the executive branch and the legislature, coordinating major national policies and responding to parliamentary issues.

=== Mayor of Gwangju ===
Jung was elected as the Mayor of Gwangju in the June 2022 local elections. Since taking office on July 1, 2022, he has focused on transforming Gwangju into a "City of Opportunity," prioritizing industrial growth in sectors such as artificial intelligence (AI) and future mobility.
