= Baegamsan (Jeonnam-Gwangju and North Jeolla) =

Mountain in South Korea

Baegamsan (Jeollanam-do)
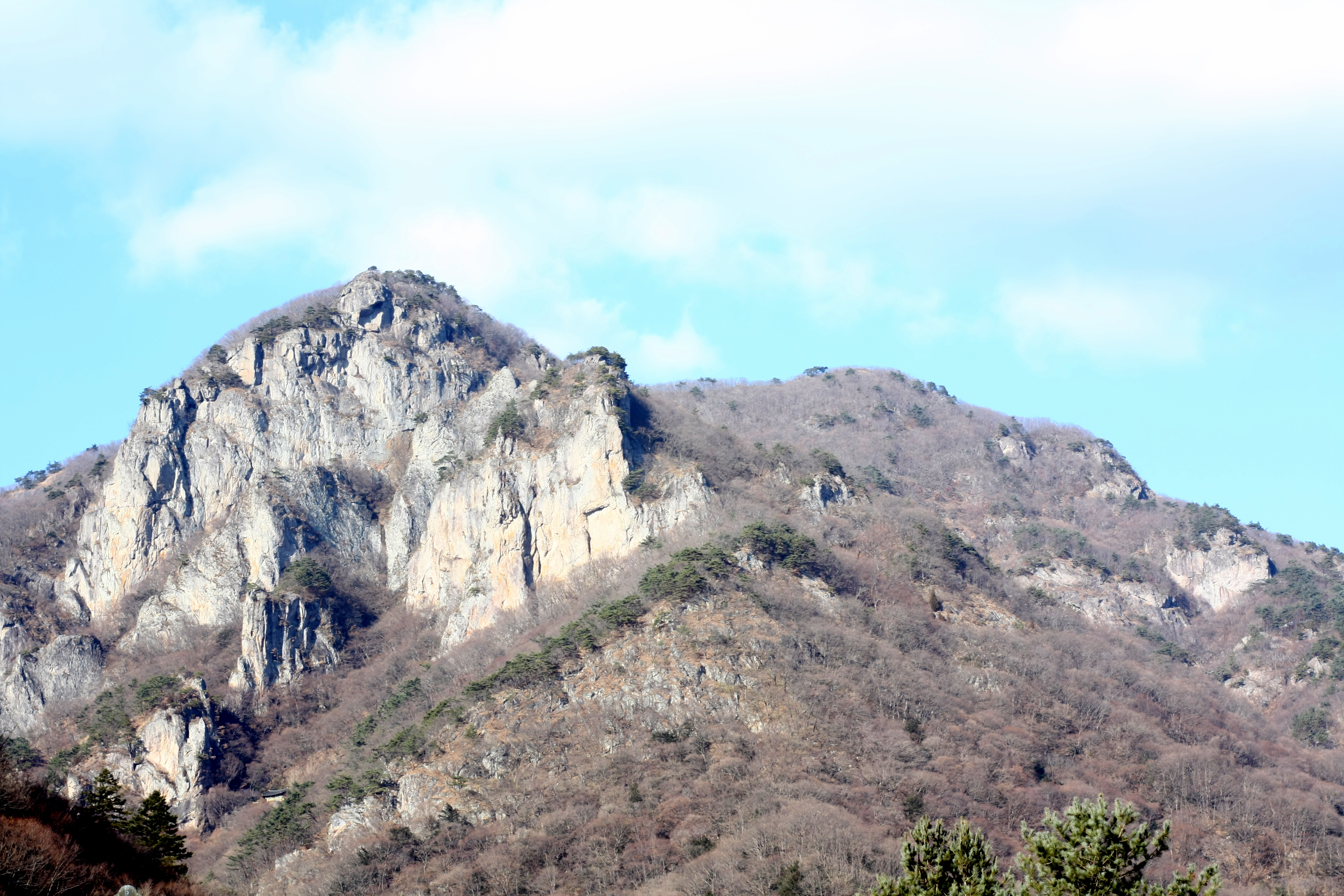
- Baegamsan.

Highest point
- Elevation: 742 m (2,434 ft)
- Listing: Mountains of Korea
- Coordinates: 35°27′46″N 126°51′03″E

Geography
- Country: South Korea
- Provincial-level city: Jeonnam-Gwangju

Baegamsan is a mountain of Jeonnam-Gwangju, western South Korea. It has an elevation of 742 metres.
