= Cheondeungsan (Jeonnam-Gwangju) =

Mountain in South Korea

Highest point
- Elevation: 550 m (1,800 ft)

Geography
- Location: Jeonnam-Gwangju, South Korea

Korean name
- Hangul: 천등산
- Hanja: 天登山
- RR: Cheondeungsan
- MR: Ch'ŏndŭngsan

Cheondeungsan (Korean: 천등산) is a mountain of Jeonnam-Gwangju, in western South Korea. It has an elevation of 550 metres.

== See also ==
- List of mountains of Korea
