= Kwon Eun-hee =

South Korean politician (born 1974)

Kwon Eun-hee (Korean: 권은희; Hanja: 權垠希; born 15 February 1974) is a South Korean politician, police officer and lawyer. She was floor leader of the People Party in the South Korean National Assembly.

== Election results ==
Year	Elections	Constituency	Political party	Votes (%)	Results
2014	2014 By-election	Gwangsan B (Gwangju)	NPAD	21,545 (60.61%)	Won
2016	20th National Assembly General Election	Gwangsan B (Gwangju)	People's (2016)	50,724 (50.14%)	Won
2020	21st National Assembly General Election	Proportional representation (3rd)	People's (2020)	1,896,719 (6.79%)	Elected

== See also ==
- List of members of the National Assembly (South Korea), 2020–2024
