= Gwangju Metropolitan Council =

Gwangju Metropolitan Council 광주광역시의회
- 9th Gwangju Metropolitan Council

Type
- Type: Unicameral

History
- Founded: 8 July 1991

Leadership
- Chairman: Kim Yong-jip, Democratic
- Vice Chairman: Cho Seok-ho, Democratic
- Vice Chairman: Cheong Sun-ae, Democratic

Structure
- Seats: 23
- Political groups: Democratic (22) People Power (1)
- Length of term: 4 years

Elections
- Voting system: Parallel voting: First-past-the-post (20 seats); Party-list proportional representation (3 seats)
- Last election: 1 June 2022

Website
- Gwangju Metropolitan Council (Korean); Gwangju Metropolitan Council (English)

- Gwangju Metropolitan Council
- Hangul: 광주광역시의회
- Hanja: 光州廣域市議會
- RR: Gwangju-gwangyeoksi uihoe
- MR: Kwangju-gwangyŏksi ŭihoe

The Gwangju Metropolitan Council (Korean: 광주광역시의회) is the local council of Gwangju, South Korea.

There are a total of 23 members, with 20 members elected in the First-past-the-post voting system and 3 members elected in Party-list proportional representation.

== Current composition ==
Political party	Seats
Democratic	22
People Power	1
Total	23

Negotiation groups can be formed by four or more members. There are currently a negotiation group in the council, formed by the Democratic Party of Korea only.

== Organization ==
The structure of Council consists of:

- Chairman
- Two Vice-chairmen
- Standing Committees
  - Steering Committee of Council
  - Administration and Autonomy Committee
  - Environment and Welfare Committee
  - Industry and Construction Committee
  - Education and Culture Committee
- Special Committees
  - Special Committees on Budget and Accounts
  - Special Committees on Ethics

== Recent election results ==
=== 2018 ===
Summary of the 13 June 2018 Gwangju Metropolitan Council election results
Party	Constituency				Party list				Total seats	
Party	Votes	%	Seats	±	Votes	%	Seats	±	Seats	±
Democratic Party of Korea	423,304	73.98	20	▲1	461,406	67.47	2	0	22	▲1
Justice Party	—N/a				87,327	12.77	1	▲1	1	▲1
Party for Democracy and Peace	72,568	12.68	0	new	56,341	8.23	0	new	0	new
Minjung Party	32,129	5.62	0	new	31,417	4.59	0	new	0	new
Bareunmirae Party	35,160	6.15	0	new	30,015	4.38	0	new	0	new
Liberty Korea Party	—N/a				9,465	1.38	0	0	0	0
Labor Party	—N/a				4,257	0.62	0	0	0	0
Green Party Korea	—N/a				3,610	0.52	0	new	0	new
Independents	8,989	1.57	0	0	—N/a				0	0
Total	572,150	100.00	20	–	683,838	100.00	3	–	23	–
