= Sambongsan (Jeonnam-Gwangju and South Gyeongsang) =

Mountain in Jeollanam-do, South Korea

Highest point
- Elevation: 1,187 m (3,894 ft)

Geography
- Location: Jeonnam-Gwangju, South Korea

Sambongsan (Korean: 삼봉산) is a mountain of Jeonnam-Gwangju, southwestern South Korea. It has an elevation of 1,187 metres.

== See also ==
- List of mountains of Korea
