= Sambongsan (North Chungcheong) =

Mountain in South Korea

Highest point
- Elevation: 910 m (2,990 ft)

Geography
- Location: South Korea

Sambongsan is a mountain of South Korea. It has an elevation of 910 metres.

== See also ==
- List of mountains of Korea
