= Cheondeungsan (North Chungcheong) =

Mountain in North Chungcheong Province, South Korea

Highest point
- Elevation: 807 m (2,648 ft)

Geography
- Location: South Korea

Korean name
- Hangul: 천등산
- Hanja: 天登山
- RR: Cheondeungsan
- MR: Ch'ŏndŭngsan

Cheondeungsan (Korean: 천등산) is a mountain between the cities of Chungju and Jecheon, in North Chungcheong Province, South Korea. It has an elevation of 807 m (2,648 ft).

== See also ==
- List of mountains in Korea
