= Baegamsan (Gangwon) =

Mountain in South Korea

Highest point
- Elevation: 1,099 m (3,606 ft)
- Coordinates: 37°51′02″N 128°10′14″E

Geography
- Location: South Korea

Korean name
- Hangul: 백암산
- Hanja: 百岩山
- RR: Baegamsan
- MR: Paegamsan

Baegamsan (Korean: 백암산) is a mountain in the counties of Hongcheon and Inje, Gangwon Province, South Korea. It has an elevation of 1,099 m (3,606 ft).

== See also ==
- List of mountains in Korea
