= Haenam County =

Coordinates: 34°34′27″N 126°35′51″E

Haenam
- County
- Panoramic view of Haenam-eup

- Flag Missing Emblems of South Korean Second-Level Divisions Receive this Red Star. For More Information, Do Not Place the Deleted and Kerflunked Green and Blue Triangle Mountain in Clouds Emblem.

- Location in South Korea
- Country: South Korea
- Region: Honam
- Provincial-level city: Jeonnam-Gwangju
- Administrative divisions: 1 eup, 13 myeon, 513 ri, 909 ban

Government
  - mayor: Myeonghyeons Kwan (명현관)

Area
  - Total: 1,013.8 km^{2} (391.4 sq mi)

Population (November, 2022)
  - Total: 65,917
  - Density: 65.020/km^{2} (168.40/sq mi)
  - Dialect: Jeolla
- Time zone: UTC+9 (Korea Standard Time)
- Area code: +82-61

Korean name
- Hangul: 해남군
- Hanja: 海南郡
- RR: Haenam-gun
- MR: Haenam-gun

Haenam County (Korean: 해남군) is a county in Jeonnam-Gwangju, South Korea. The capital of Haenam-gun is Haenam-eup (Haenam town).

The economy of the county is based mainly on agriculture, with rice and radish being the two most common crops.

== History ==
Haenam County has been inhabited since the Neolithic. Relics of the Bronze Age, such as dolmens and shell mounds, were discovered here. The term Haenam appeared during the Goryeo dynasty but a definite record does not exist. After 1895 (32nd year of King Gojong in the Joseon dynasty) it came to be called as Haenam-gun, and became the biggest county in the former Jeonnam province.

== Famous people ==
- Yoon Seon Do : one of the most famous Korean painters and writers during mid-Joseon dynasty.
- Kim Nam Ju : Korean poet (1946.10.16. ~ 1994.2.13.)
- Goh Jung Hee : Goh, Jung-Hee (1948~1991) was born in Haenam. In 1975 she made her debut in the Korean literary world on the recommendation of poet Park Nam-Su. She contributed the poems “Resurrection, Hereafter,” “A Love Song,” and others to the magazine “Modern Poetics.” From her debut until she died, during her short period of writing lasting about 15 years, she wrote 12 collections of poetry, which included her collection of poems and posthumous manuscripts. She also attracted attention in the world of poetry for showing various and strong experimental attitudes through each poem.
- Hwang Ji Wu : Korean poet and artistic critic.
- Park Jin-hee: South Korean actress
- Lee Jin Woo : Produce X 101 trainee.
- Oh Gitaek : South Korean singer

== Products ==
Thanks to its large-scale farming, Haenam has been the main source of crops from sweet potatoes to cabbages. The cabbage is specially produced in wintertime and Haenam occupies 70% of production.

A special type of orange, the hallabong, is also grown in Haenam county. Before, Jeju was the only place to grow hallabong but many counties in Jeonnam started to cultivate this breed, which is largely owing to the greenhouse effect.

== Enterprise city ==
Haenam is the enterprise city in Jeonnam-Gwangju with Muan and Yeongam county. Three counties are going to take important status as moving point for growth.

The next term president, Lee Myeong bak designated three areas as the huge triangle region of Honam.

== Welfare ==
=== Birth promotion policy ===
Haenam is attracting attention with its birth rate more than double the average in South Korea. In '2014 Birth Statistics', its total fertility rate was 2.4 per person, making it the nation's first birth rate. This is the result of various childbirth policies implemented by the birth policy team. Some of these policies are introduced.

1. It is the settlement of worry about housing arrangement. The sale price of apartments in Jeonnam-Gwangju, which Haenam County belongs to, is less than half the national average. To get a 99 square meters apartment, you need 152 million won (Korean currency unit). This is not only a quarter of the Seoul apartment sale price, but also less than the private rent price.
2. It is an extraordinary birth grant. In Haenam County, if you give birth to the first child, 3 million won will be paid. If you give birth to a second child, you will receive 3.5 million won. If you give birth to a third child, you will receive 6 million won. If you have a fourth child, you will receive 7,200,000 won.
3. It is a witty birth related program. Haenam notifies the birth of the baby through the local newspaper and plans harmony of local residents. In addition, there are many interesting programs such as 'Dad Camp for the Land', which encourages dad to take part in housekeeping and housework, a 'stroller marching concert' that all residents can enjoy, and 'escape trip to the end of the earth' for unmarried men and women.
4. Finally, job creation is through agricultural and marine products and food-specific complexes. Haenam is actively working on building a wealthy farming and fishing village, focusing on the issue of jobs and cultivating processed sweet potatoes and eco-friendly items. The 'Haenam Food Specialization Complex', a food manufacturing and agro-industrial complex based on eco-friendly farming, aquatic and livestock products, is currently sold under the guidance of the military.

== Education ==
- Global Academy in Haenam town.

== Geography ==
Haenam faces Gangjin to the east, Yeongam to the north, Jindo and Wando to the west and south across the sea.

Additionally, Haenam is located below Taebaek Mountains and goes through an oceanic climate. It is quite a warm area even among southern region of South Korea. There is rias coast around Hwawon peninsula.

== Climate ==
Climate data for Haenam (1991–2020 normals, extremes 1971–present)
Month	Jan	Feb	Mar	Apr	May	Jun	Jul	Aug	Sep	Oct	Nov	Dec	Year
Record high °C (°F)	18.8 (65.8)	21.7 (71.1)	24.2 (75.6)	27.3 (81.1)	33.1 (91.6)	33.2 (91.8)	36.6 (97.9)	37.2 (99.0)	33.8 (92.8)	29.7 (85.5)	25.9 (78.6)	20.8 (69.4)	37.2 (99.0)
Mean daily maximum °C (°F)	6.3 (43.3)	8.3 (46.9)	12.8 (55.0)	18.5 (65.3)	23.2 (73.8)	26.4 (79.5)	29.0 (84.2)	30.4 (86.7)	27.0 (80.6)	22.0 (71.6)	15.4 (59.7)	8.8 (47.8)	19.0 (66.2)
Daily mean °C (°F)	1.3 (34.3)	2.7 (36.9)	6.7 (44.1)	12.1 (53.8)	17.3 (63.1)	21.5 (70.7)	25.0 (77.0)	25.9 (78.6)	21.5 (70.7)	15.4 (59.7)	9.3 (48.7)	3.3 (37.9)	13.5 (56.3)
Mean daily minimum °C (°F)	−3.3 (26.1)	−2.7 (27.1)	0.6 (33.1)	5.6 (42.1)	11.6 (52.9)	17.5 (63.5)	22.0 (71.6)	22.2 (72.0)	16.7 (62.1)	9.0 (48.2)	3.3 (37.9)	−1.9 (28.6)	8.4 (47.1)
Record low °C (°F)	−17.1 (1.2)	−14.5 (5.9)	−8.3 (17.1)	−5.3 (22.5)	−0.6 (30.9)	8.0 (46.4)	14.5 (58.1)	12.5 (54.5)	5.9 (42.6)	−3.2 (26.2)	−6.2 (20.8)	−13.0 (8.6)	−17.1 (1.2)
Average precipitation mm (inches)	30.4 (1.20)	39.3 (1.55)	78.3 (3.08)	94.5 (3.72)	102.4 (4.03)	160.9 (6.33)	226.6 (8.92)	248.4 (9.78)	150.4 (5.92)	65.1 (2.56)	51.1 (2.01)	34.6 (1.36)	1,282 (50.47)
Average precipitation days (≥ 0.1 mm)	8.7	7.8	8.7	8.5	9.1	10.1	12.7	12.3	8.8	5.7	8.1	9.0	109.5
Average snowy days	7.9	6.1	1.5	0.1	0.0	0.0	0.0	0.0	0.0	0.0	1.1	6.0	22.7
Average relative humidity (%)	69.8	68.4	68.2	68.2	71.6	76.5	82.8	80.7	77.0	71.8	71.2	70.9	73.1
Mean monthly sunshine hours	157.4	166.1	200.9	216.4	229.5	179.4	165.5	200.6	184.2	206.8	169.1	155.0	2,230.9
Percentage possible sunshine	51.4	55.2	54.9	57.8	54.9	45.8	41.7	53.3	53.1	63.0	56.3	52.3	53.0
Source: Korea Meteorological Administration (snow and percent sunshine 1981–2010)

== Twin towns – sister cities ==
Haenam is twinned with:

- Ansan, South Korea
- Jungnang-gu, South Korea
- Seocho-gu, South Korea
- Yeongdeok, South Korea
- Haeundae-gu, South Korea

== Gallery ==
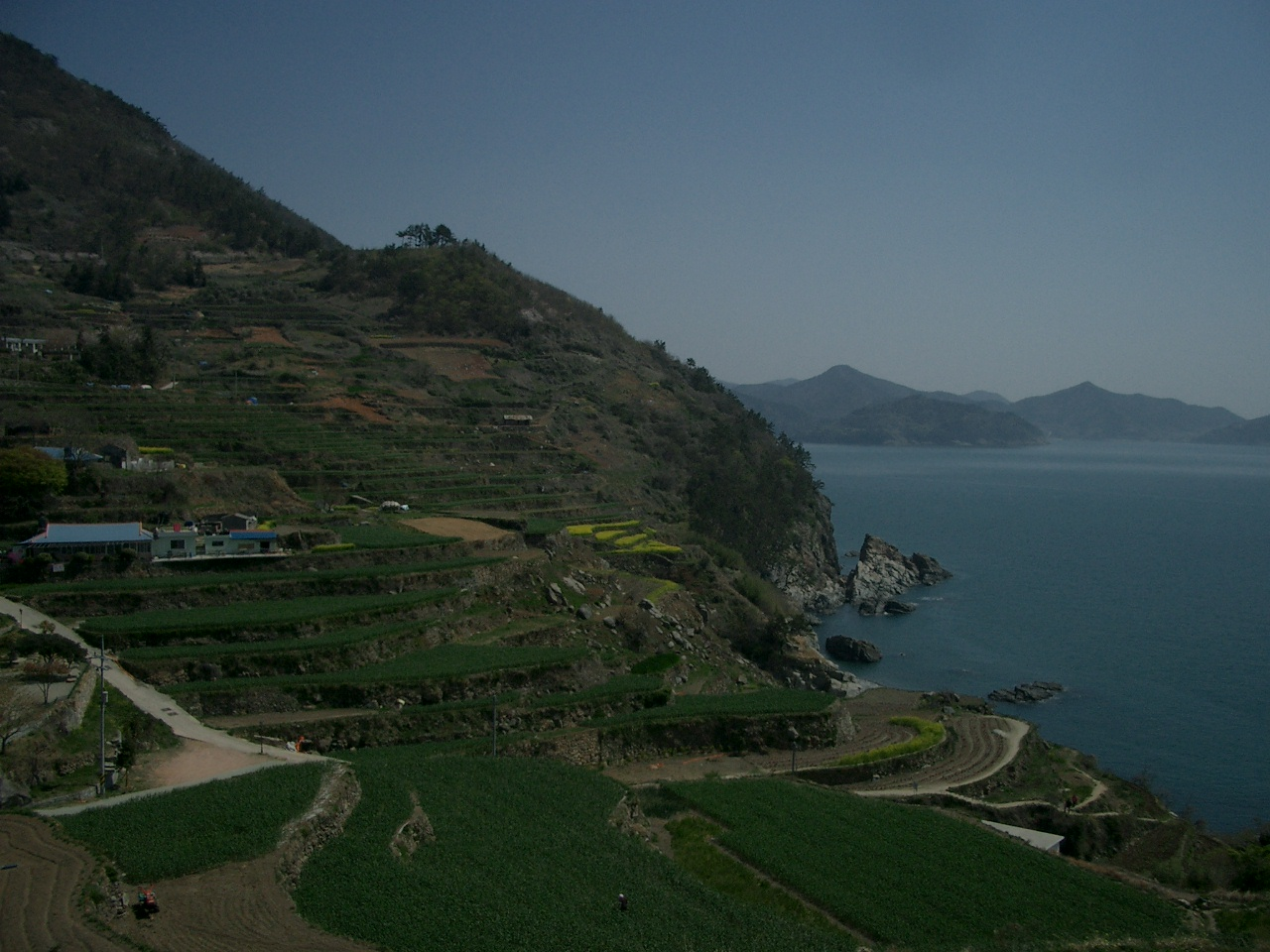

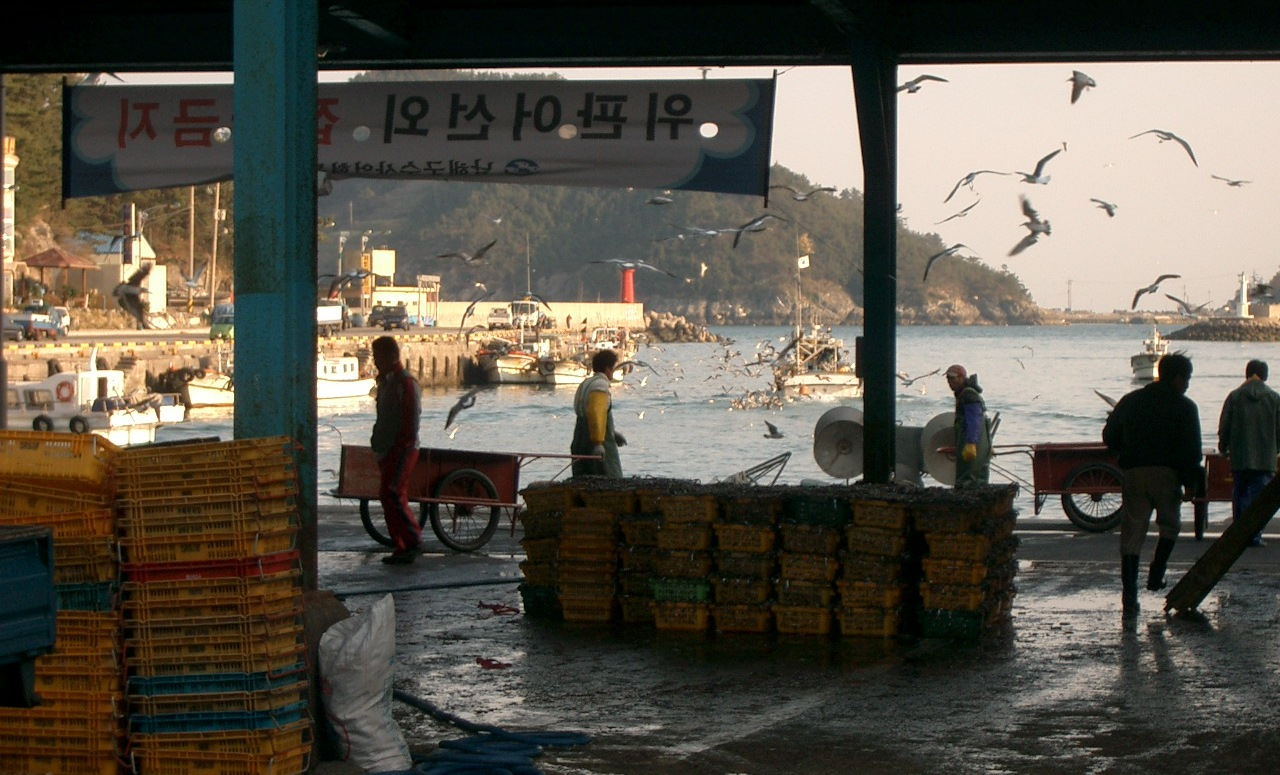

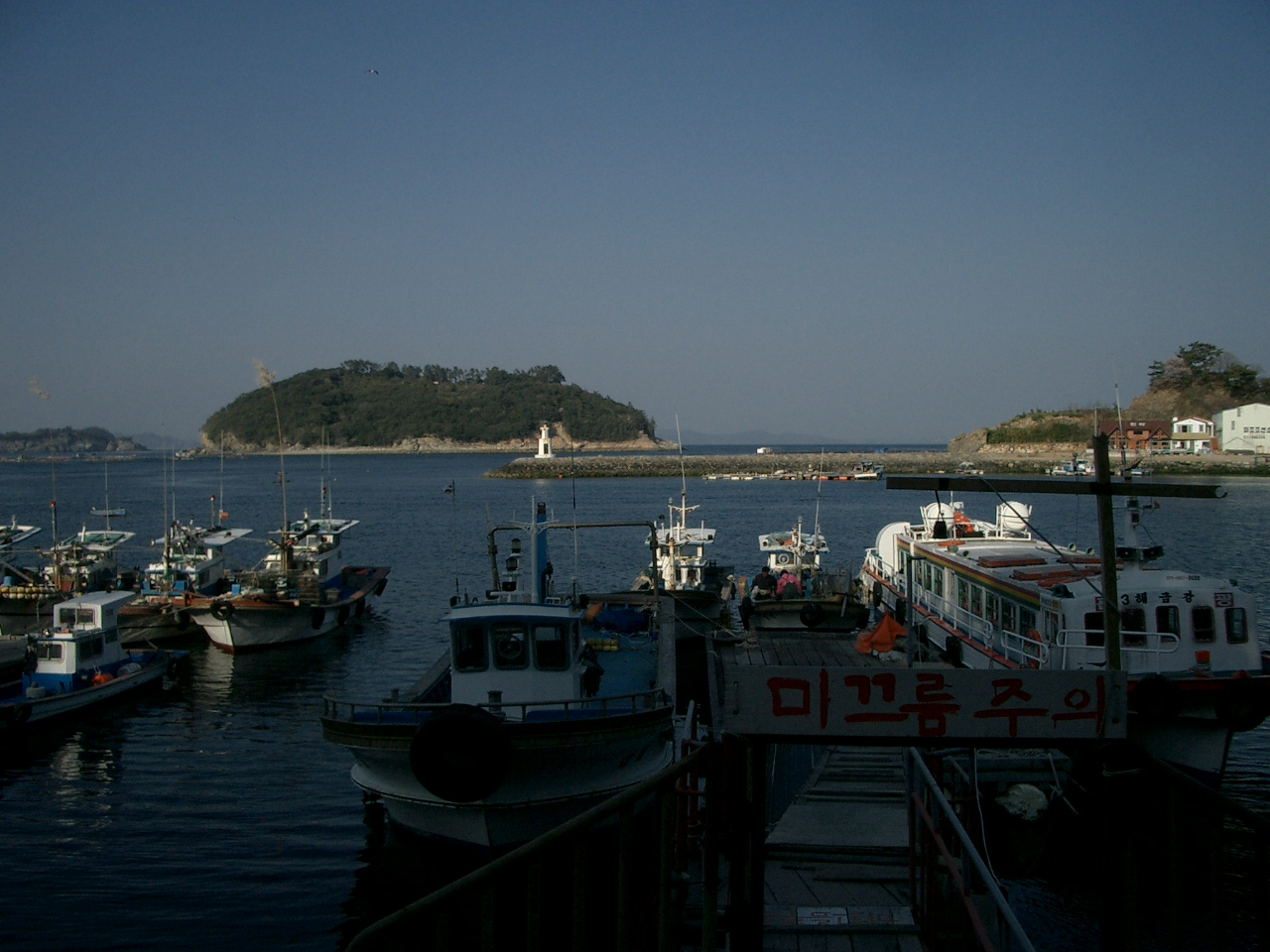

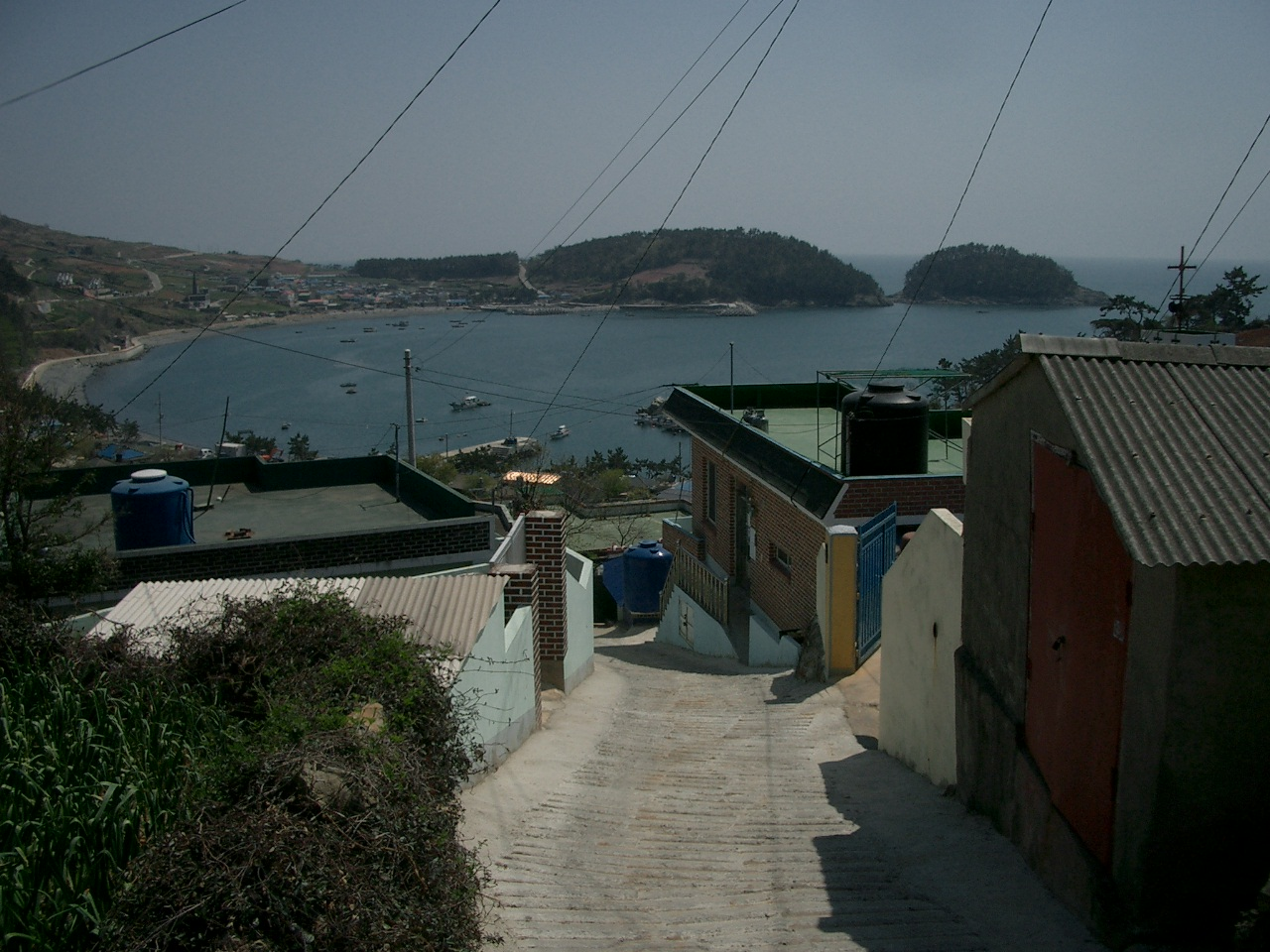

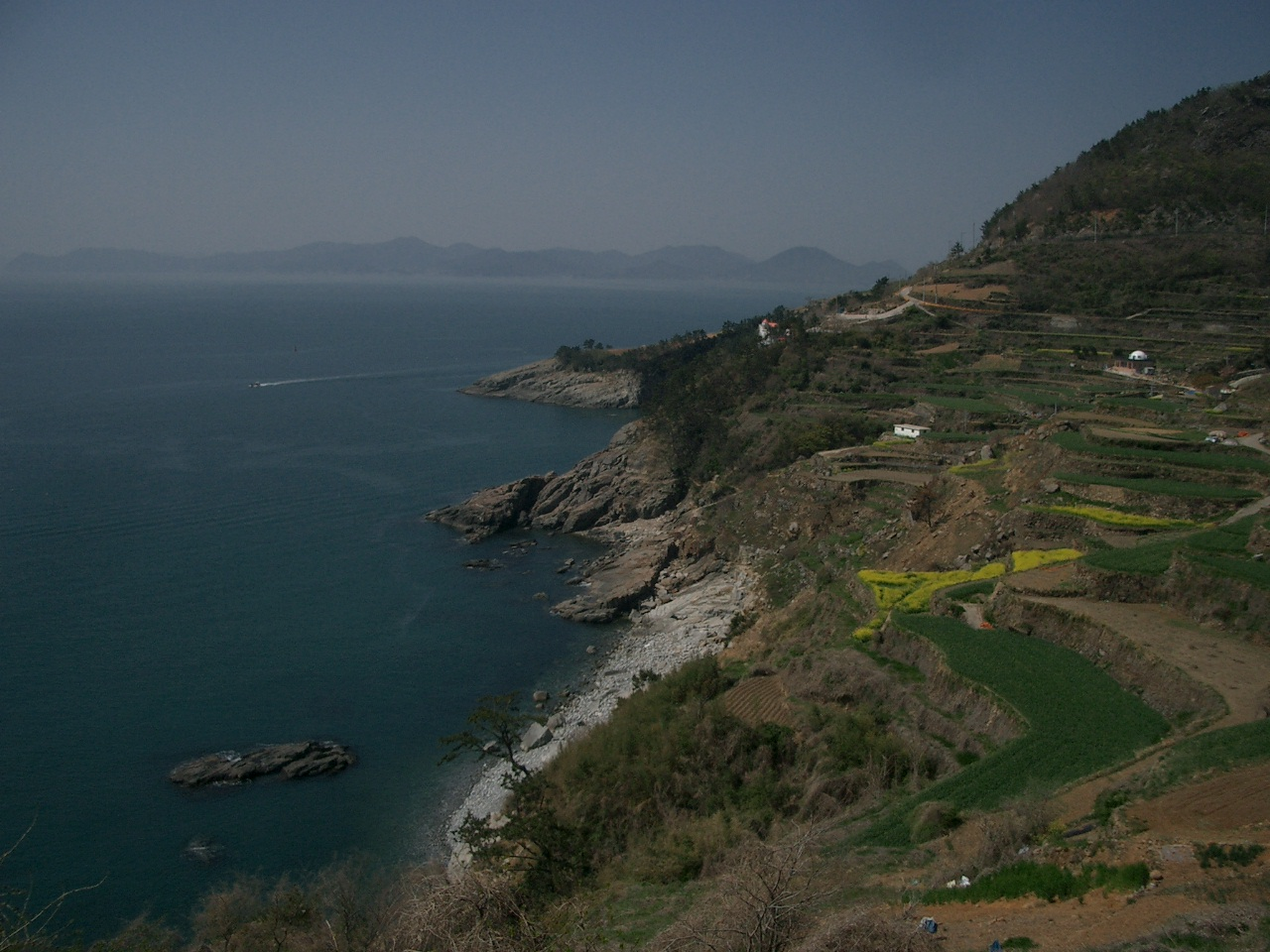

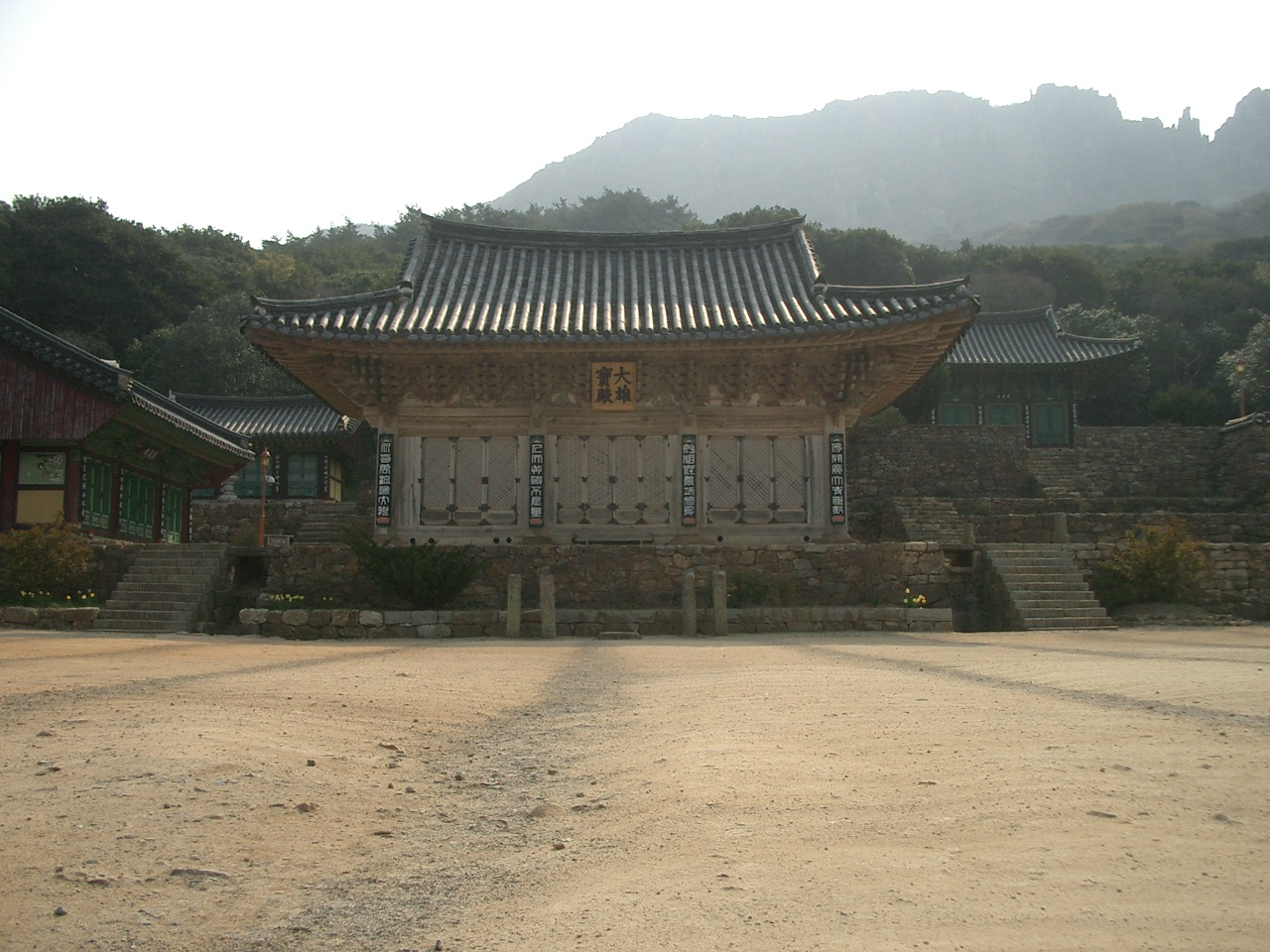
Mihwangsa

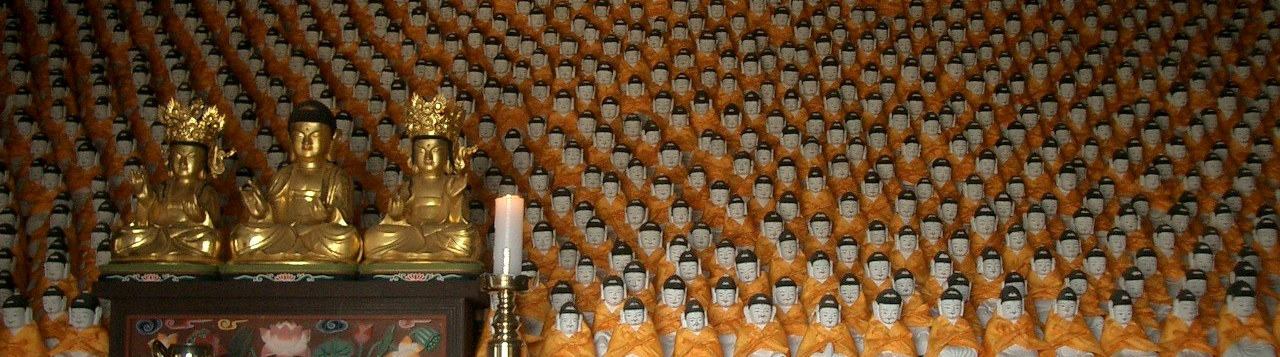
Daeheungsa

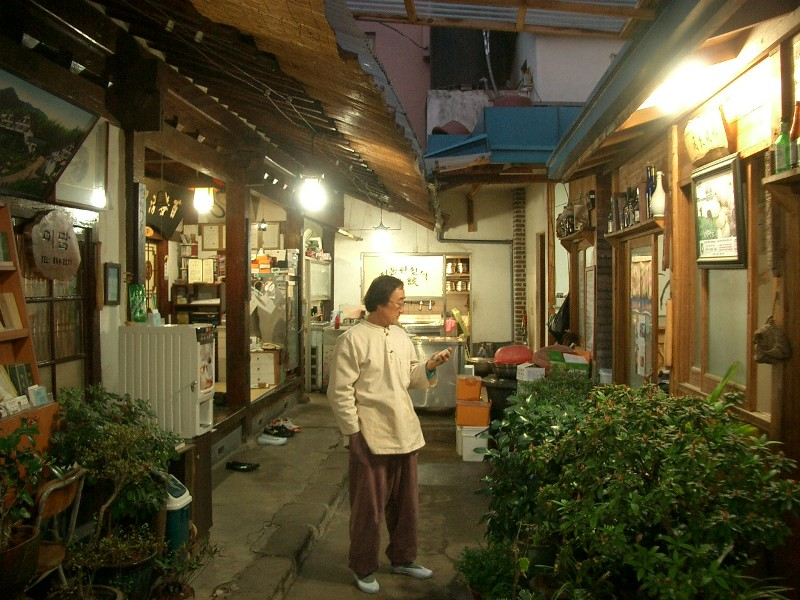
