= Sambongsan (Geochang) =

Mountain in South Korea

Highest point
- Elevation: 1,254 m (4,114 ft)

Geography
- Location: South Gyeongsang Province, South Korea

Sambongsan is a mountain of South Gyeongsang Province, southeastern South Korea. It has an elevation of 1,254 metres.

== See also ==
- List of mountains of Korea
