= Baegamsan (North Gyeongsang) =

Mountain in South Korea

Coordinates: 36.8215°N 128.1184°E

Highest point
- Elevation: 1,004 m (3,294 ft)

Geography
- Location: North Gyeongsang Province, South Korea

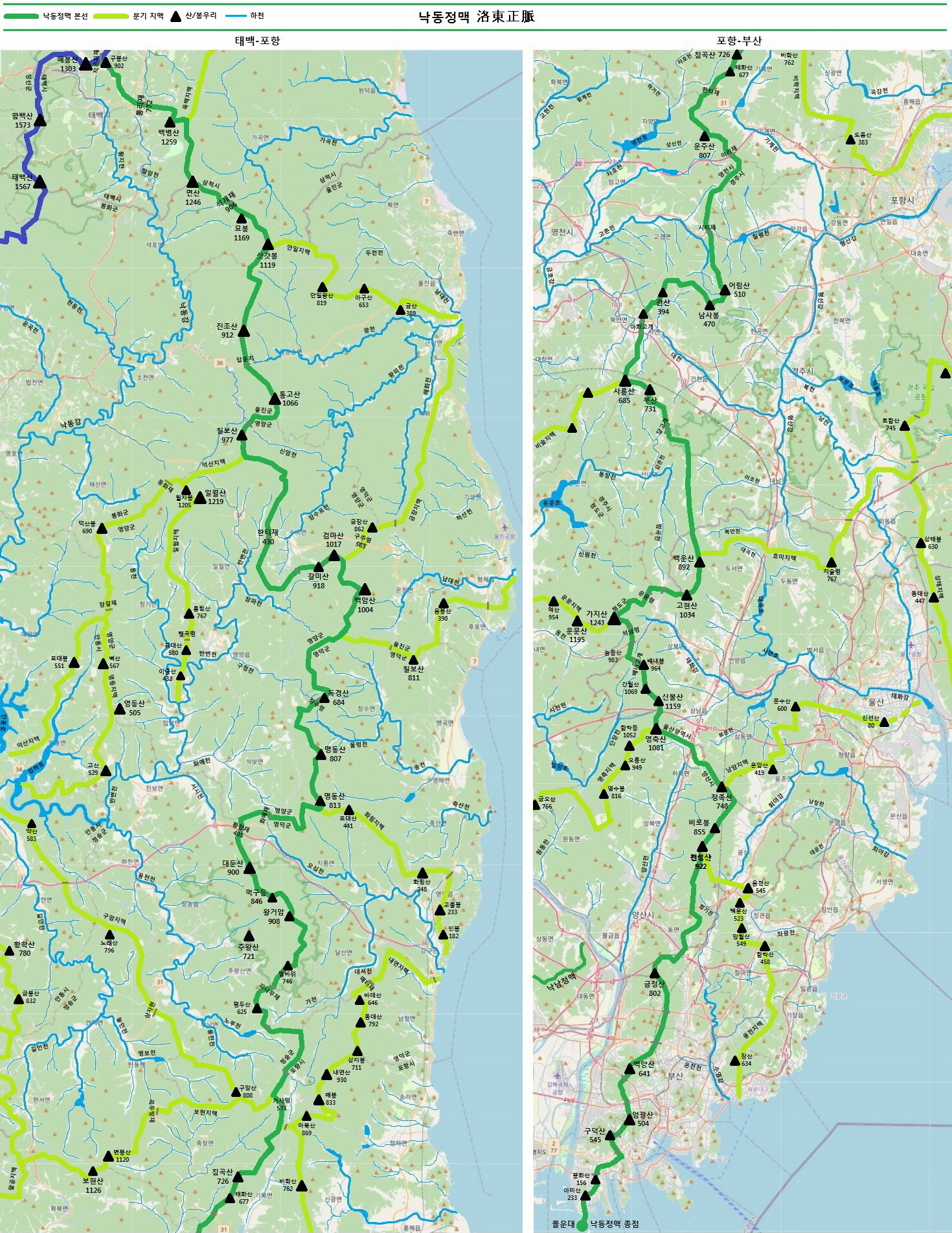

Baegamsan is a mountain of North Gyeongsang Province, eastern South Korea. It has an elevation of 1,004 metres.

== See also ==
- List of mountains of Korea
