= Cheondeungsan (North Gyeongsang) =

Mountain in eastern South Korea

Highest point
- Elevation: 574 m (1,883 ft)

Geography
- Location: North Gyeongsang Province, South Korea

Korean name
- Hangul: 천등산
- Hanja: 天燈山
- RR: Cheondeungsan
- MR: Ch'ŏndŭngsan

Cheondeungsan (Korean: 천등산) is a mountain of North Gyeongsang Province, eastern South Korea. It has an elevation of 574 metres.

== See also ==
- List of mountains of Korea
