= Cheondeungsan (North Jeolla) =

Mountain in South Korea

Highest point
- Elevation: 707 m (2,320 ft)

Geography
- Location: North Jeolla Province, South Korea

Korean name
- Hangul: 천등산
- Hanja: 天燈山
- RR: Cheondeungsan
- MR: Ch'ŏndŭngsan

Cheondeungsan (Korean: 천등산) is a mountain of North Jeolla Province, western South Korea. It has an elevation of 707 metres.

== See also ==
- List of mountains of Korea
