= Mayor of Gwangju =

Mayor of South Korean metropolis

- 광주광역시장
- Seal of Gwangju
- Term length: Four years
- Inaugural holder: Seo Min-ho
- Formation: 16 August 1948
- Final holder: Kang Gi-jung
- Abolished: 30 June 2026
- Succession: Mayor of Jeonnam-Gwangju

The Mayor of Gwangju (Korean: 광주광역시장; Hanja: 光州廣域市長) was the head of the local government of Gwangju, South Korea. The mayor was elected to a four-year term.

The office was abolished on 30 June 2026, following the merger of Gwangju with South Jeolla Province into Jeonnam-Gwangju. The Mayor of Jeonnam-Gwangju then became the successor to the position of Mayor of Gwangju.

== List of mayors ==
=== Appointed mayors (before 1995) ===
From 1945 to 1995, the Mayor of Gwangju was appointed by the President of the Republic of Korea.

=== Directly elected mayors (1995–present) ===
From 1995 to 2026, under provisions of the revised Local Government Act, the Mayor of Gwangju was elected by direct election.

Political parties
Liberal

Term	Portrait	Name (Birth–Death)	Term of office			Political party	Elected
Term	Portrait	Name (Birth–Death)	Took office	Left office	Time in office	Political party	Elected
1st		Song Un-jong 송언종 宋彦鐘 (1937–2020)	1 July 1995	30 June 1998	3 years, 0 days	Democratic → National Congress	1995
2nd		Goh Jae-yu 고재유 高在維 (born 1938)	1 July 1998	30 June 2002	4 years, 0 days	National Congress → Millennium Democratic	1998
3rd		Park Gwang-tae 박광태 朴光泰 (born 1943)	1 July 2002	30 June 2010	8 years, 0 days	Millennium Democratic → Democratic ('00) → Democratic ('08)	2002
4th		Park Gwang-tae 박광태 朴光泰 (born 1943)	1 July 2002	30 June 2010	8 years, 0 days	Millennium Democratic → Democratic ('00) → Democratic ('08)	2006
5th		Kang Woon-tae 강운태 姜雲太 (born 1948)	1 July 2010	30 June 2014	4 years, 0 days	Democratic ('08) → Democratic United → Democratic ('11) → NPAD	2010
6th		Yoon Jang-hyun 윤장현 尹壯鉉 (born 1949)	1 July 2014	30 June 2018	4 years, 0 days	NPAD → Democratic	2014
7th		Lee Yong-seop 이용섭 李庸燮 (born 1951)	1 July 2018	30 June 2022	4 years, 0 days	Democratic	2018
8th		Kang Gi-jung 강기정 姜琪正 (born 1964)	1 July 2022	30 June 2026	4 years, 0 days	Democratic	2022

== Elections ==
=== 1995 ===
1995 Gwangju mayoral election
Party	#	Candidate	Votes	Percentage
Democratic	2	Song Un-jong	469,570	89.71%
Democratic Liberal	1	Kim Dong-hwan	53,817	10.28%
Total			523,387	100.00%
Voter turnout			64.82%	

=== 1998 ===
1998 Gwangju mayoral election
Party	#	Candidate	Votes	Percentage
National Congress	2	Goh Jae-yu	261,578	67.20%
Independent	4	Lee Seung-chae	127,626	32.79%
Total			389,204	100.00%
Voter turnout			45.07%	

=== 2002 ===
2002 Gwangju mayoral election
Party	#	Candidate	Votes	Percentage
Millennium Democratic	2	Park Gwang-tae	185,938	46.81%
Independent	5	Chung Dong-nyun	107,415	27.04%
Grand National	1	Lee Hwan-eui	43,695	11.00%
Democratic Labor	3	Park Jong-hyun	29,427	7.40%
Independent	6	Chung Ho-sun	20,796	5.23%
Independent	4	Chung Koo-sun	9,877	2.48%
Total			397,148	100.00%
Voter turnout			42.31%	

=== 2006 ===
2006 Gwangju mayoral election
Party	#	Candidate	Votes	Percentage
Democratic	3	Park Gwang-tae	239,884	51.61%
Uri	1	Cho Young-taek	157,756	33.94%
Democratic Labor	4	Oh Byung-yoon	48,617	10.46%
Grand National	2	Han Young	18,461	3.97%
Total			464,718	100.00%
Voter turnout			46.26%	

=== 2010 ===
2010 Gwangju mayoral election
Party	#	Candidate	Votes	Percentage
Democratic	2	Kang Woon-tae	297,003	56.73%
Participation	8	Chung Chan-yong	75,830	14.48%
Grand National	1	Chung Yong-hwa	74,490	14.22%
Democratic Labor	5	Chang Won-seop	39,455	7.53%
New Progressive	7	Yoon Nan-sil	30,834	5.89%
Peace Democratic	9	Cho Hong-kyu	5,871	1.12%
Total			523,483	100.00%
Voter turnout			49.76%	

=== 2014 ===
2014 Gwangju mayoral election
Party	#	Candidate	Votes	Percentage
NPAD	2	Yoon Jang-hyun	367,203	57.85%
Independent	5	Kang Woon-tae	201,666	31.77%
Saenuri	1	Lee Jung-jae	21,614	3.40%
Unified Progressive	3	Yoon Min-ho	21,200	3.34%
Independent	7	Lee Byung-wan	16,249	2.56%
Labor	4	Lee Byung-hoon	6,785	1.06%
Total			634,717	100.00%
Voter turnout			57.10%	

=== 2018 ===
2018 Gwangju mayoral election
Party	#	Candidate	Votes	Percentage
Democratic	1	Lee Yong-seop	573,995	84.07%
Justice	5	Na Gyung-che	40,916	5.99%
Bareunmirae	3	Jeon Duk-young	34,487	5.05%
Minjung	6	Yoon Min-ho	33,312	4.87%
Total			682,710	100.00%
Voter turnout			59.22%	

=== 2022 ===
2022 Gwangju mayoral election
Party	#	Candidate	Votes	Percentage
Democratic	1	Kang Gi-jung	334,699	74.91%
People Power	2	Joo Ki-hwan	71,062	15.90%
Justice	3	Jang Yeun-ju	21,070	4.71%
Progressive	5	Kim Ju-eop	16,595	3.71%
Basic Income	4	Moon Hyeon-chul	3,344	0.74%
Total			446,770	100.00%
Voter turnout			37.66%	

== See also ==
- Government of South Korea
- Politics of South Korea
