= Gwangsan District =

District of Jeonnam-Gwangju, South Korea

Coordinates: 35°08′05″N 126°47′40″E

Gwangsan
- Autonomous District
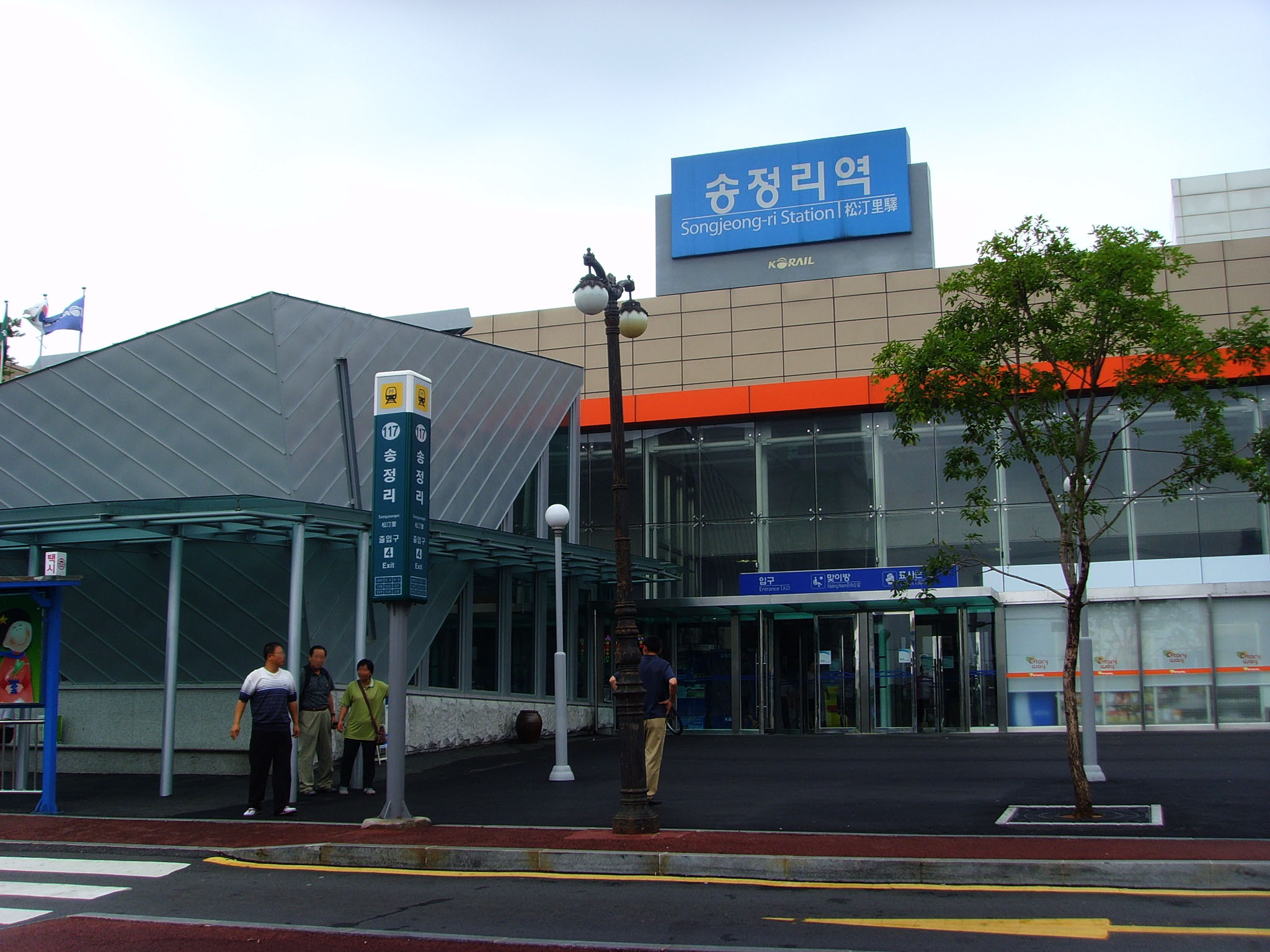

- Flag

- Country: South Korea
- Region: Honam
- Provincial-level city: Jeonnam-Gwangju

Government
  - Mayor: Park Byeong-gyu (박병규)

Area
  - Total: 222.89 km^{2} (86.06 sq mi)

Population (September 2024)
  - Total: 392,653
  - Density: 1,761.6/km^{2} (4,562.6/sq mi)
  - Dialect: Jeolla
- Website: Gwangsan District Office

Korean name
- Hangul: 광산구
- Hanja: 光山區
- RR: Gwangsan-gu
- MR: Kwangsan-gu

Gwangsan District (Korean: 광산구) is a district, similar to a ward, of Jeonnam-Gwangju, South Korea.

The district was once part of the city of Gwangju, but on July 1, 2026, that city was dissolved and merged with South Jeolla Province into the provincial-level city of Jeonnam-Gwangju. Now, the district is directly managed under Jeonnam-Gwangju.

The total population of the district, as of September 2004, is 295,294, and the population density of the district is 1,085 per 1 km.

Its area was about 45% of the city of Gwangju.

The district bird is the White Heron, the district flower is Magnolia, and the district tree is the Pine Tree. Gwangsan District has 1913 Songseong Market, and Songseong Market (held every 3,8 day), Yonga birthplace, and there has Korean wheat festival.

== Sister cities ==
Panyu district, Guangzhou
