= Gwangju =

Former city in South Korea

- Metropolitan City
- Gwangju Metropolitan City
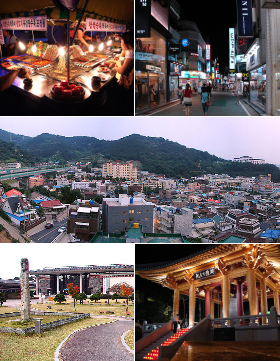
- Above: Badhoe Pojangmacha Street Restaurant, Geumnamo Shopping district Middle: Panorama view of resident area of Gwangsan District Bottom: Gwangju Folk Museum, Democracy Bell in Denman Estate Park (All items are left to right)

- Flag Logo

- Interactive map of Gwangju
- Location within South Korea Location within Asia Location within Earth
- Coordinates: 35°09′55″N 126°50′55″E
- Country: Republic of Korea
- Region: Honam
- Districts: 5

Government
  - Type: Mayor–Council
  - Mayor: First: Song Un-jong; Last: Kang Gi-jung
  - Body: Gwangju Metropolitan Council

Area
  - Total: 501.24 km^{2} (193.53 sq mi)

Population (February 2026)
  - Total: 1,401,235
  - Density: 2,795.5/km^{2} (7,240.4/sq mi)
  - Dialect: Jeolla

GDP (Nominal, 2023)
  - Total: KRW 52 trillion (US$ 42 billion)
  - Per capita: US$ 30,900
- Time zone: UTC+9 (Korea Standard Time)
- Area code: +82-61
- ISO 3166 code: KR-29
- Flower: Royal Azalea
- Tree: Ginkgo
- Bird: Dove
- Website: Official website (English)

Korean name
- Hangul: 광주광역시
- Hanja: 光州廣域市
- RR: Gwangju-gwangyeoksi
- MR: Kwangju-gwangyŏksi

Gwangju (Korean: 광주; Korean: [kwaŋ.dʑu]), formerly romanized as Kwangju, was a metropolitan city in South Korea. In July 2026, the city was merged with South Jeolla Province into a new provincial-level city called Jeonnam-Gwangju or "Gwangju Special City".

Gwangju Metropolitan City was the sixth-largest metropolis in the country. It was a designated metropolitan city under the direct control of the central government's Home Minister. The city was also the capital of South Jeolla Province until its promotion to a metropolitan city in 2005, upon which the provincial office moved to the southern village of Namak in Muan County.

Its name is composed of the words gwang (Korean: 광; Hanja: 光) meaning "light" and ju (주; 州) meaning "province". Gwangju was historically recorded as Muju (무주; 武州), in which "Silla merged all of the land to establish the provinces of Gwangju, Ungju, Jeonju, Muju and various counties, plus the southern boundary of Goguryeo and the ancient territories of Silla" in the Samguk sagi. In the heart of the agricultural Jeolla region, the city is also famous for its rich and diverse cuisine.

== History ==
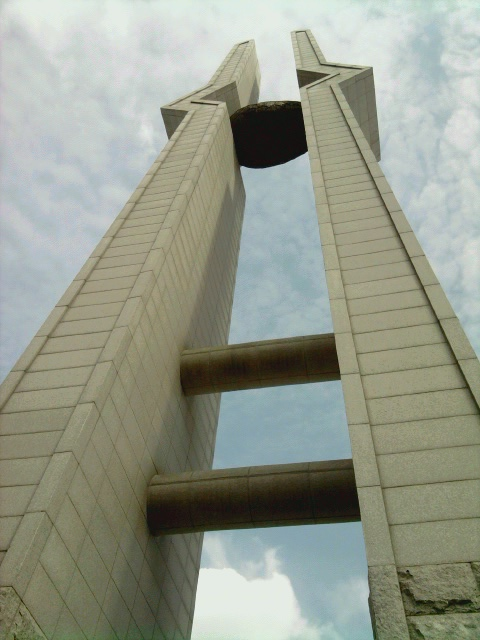
A memorial to commemorate the lives lost in the 1980 Gwangju uprising.

The city was established in 57 BC. It was one of the administrative centers of Baekje during the Three Kingdoms period.

During the Japanese colonial period, the city was known as Kōshū. On 30 October 1929, a confrontation between Korean and Japanese students at Naju Station, near Gwangju, became the immediate catalyst for the Gwangju Student Independence Movement, which began in Gwangju on 3 November and later spread throughout Korea.

Modern industry was established in Gwangju, and a railway to Seoul was constructed. Some industries that took hold include cotton textiles, rice mills, and breweries. The construction of a designated industrial zone in 1967 encouraged growth in industry, especially in the sectors linked to the automobile industry.

In May 1980, peaceful demonstrations took place in Gwangju against Chun Doo-hwan, leader of the military coup d'état of 12 December 1979. The demonstrations were suppressed by military forces, including elite units of the Special Operations Command. The situation escalated after a violent crackdown, resulting in the Gwangju Uprising, where civilians raided armories and armed themselves. By the time the uprising was suppressed 9 days later, many hundreds of civilians and several police forces/soldiers were dead. After civilian rule was reinstated in 1987, a national cemetery was established to honor the victims of the incident.

In 1986, Gwangju separated from South Jeolla Province to become a Directly Governed City (Jikhalsi), and then became a Metropolitan City (Gwangyeoksi) in 1995.

Due to a variety of factors, including the ancient rivalry between Baekje and Silla, as well as the biased priority given to the Gyeongsang Province region by political leaders in the 2nd half of the 20th century, Gwangju has a long history of voting for left-leaning politicians and is the main stronghold for the liberal Democratic Party of Korea along with its predecessors, as well as the progressive Justice Party.

Gwangju has held many sports events such as the 2002 FIFA World Cup, the 2015 Summer Universiade, and the 2019 World Aquatics Championships.

In July 2026, the city was dissolved and merged with the former territory of South Jeolla Province into a new provincial-level city called Jeonnam-Gwangju.

== Administrative divisions ==
Gwangju is divided into 5 districts ("Gu").

Map	Name	Korean	Hanja
Districts
	Buk District	북구	北區
	Dong District	동구	東區
	Gwangsan District	광산구	光山區
	Nam District	남구	南區
	Seo District	서구	西區

Religion in Gwangju (2024)
1. Not religious (50.0%)
2. Buddhism (11.0%)
3. Protestantism (25.0%)
4. Catholicism (11.0%)
5. Others (3.00%)

== Demographics ==
Historical population
Year	Pop.	±%
1970	493,634	—
1980	727,600	+47.4%
1990	1,139,003	+56.5%
2000	1,352,797	+18.8%
2010	1,475,745	+9.1%
2020	1,477,573	+0.1%

According to the census of 2015, 9.5% of the population followed Buddhism and 28.7% followed Christianity (20% Protestantism and 8.7% Catholicism). 61% of the population was irreligious.

One of the largest ethnic enclaves of Koryo-saram (ethnic Koreans of the former Soviet Union) in South Korea is located in Gwangju: the Gwangju Koryoin Village. Schools in the vicinity of the village, such as Ha-nam Jung-ang Elementary School, have significant proportions of Russian speakers as a result.

== Climate ==
Gwangju has a cooler version of the humid subtropical climate (Köppen: Cfa/Cwa) with four distinct seasons and rainfall year-round but particularly during the East Asian Monsoon Season in the summer months.

Winters, while still somewhat cold, are milder than in Seoul and cities further north due to the city's southwesterly position in the Korean peninsula. Summers are hot and humid with abundant precipitation, particularly in the form of thunderstorms. Gwangju is one of the warmest cities in Korea in the summer due to its geographic location.

Climate data for Gwangju (1991–2020 normals, extremes 1939–present)
Month	Jan	Feb	Mar	Apr	May	Jun	Jul	Aug	Sep	Oct	Nov	Dec	Year
Record high °C (°F)	18.8 (65.8)	22.6 (72.7)	28.3 (82.9)	30.4 (86.7)	33.9 (93.0)	37.2 (99.0)	38.5 (101.3)	38.5 (101.3)	35.9 (96.6)	31.1 (88.0)	27.1 (80.8)	20.3 (68.5)	38.5 (101.3)
Mean daily maximum °C (°F)	5.7 (42.3)	8.3 (46.9)	13.6 (56.5)	19.9 (67.8)	24.8 (76.6)	27.9 (82.2)	30.0 (86.0)	30.9 (87.6)	27.1 (80.8)	21.9 (71.4)	15.0 (59.0)	8.0 (46.4)	19.4 (66.9)
Daily mean °C (°F)	1.0 (33.8)	2.9 (37.2)	7.5 (45.5)	13.4 (56.1)	18.7 (65.7)	22.7 (72.9)	25.9 (78.6)	26.5 (79.7)	22.2 (72.0)	16.1 (61.0)	9.6 (49.3)	3.2 (37.8)	14.1 (57.4)
Mean daily minimum °C (°F)	−2.7 (27.1)	−1.5 (29.3)	2.4 (36.3)	7.8 (46.0)	13.4 (56.1)	18.7 (65.7)	22.8 (73.0)	23.2 (73.8)	18.2 (64.8)	11.2 (52.2)	5.0 (41.0)	−0.8 (30.6)	9.8 (49.6)
Record low °C (°F)	−19.4 (−2.9)	−17.7 (0.1)	−10.7 (12.7)	−4.5 (23.9)	1.4 (34.5)	7.2 (45.0)	14.9 (58.8)	12.6 (54.7)	5.6 (42.1)	−2.7 (27.1)	−7.2 (19.0)	−13.7 (7.3)	−19.4 (−2.9)
Average precipitation mm (inches)	32.6 (1.28)	43.6 (1.72)	61.9 (2.44)	86.6 (3.41)	91.4 (3.60)	152.6 (6.01)	294.2 (11.58)	326.4 (12.85)	145.0 (5.71)	59.0 (2.32)	50.2 (1.98)	37.1 (1.46)	1,380.6 (54.35)
Average precipitation days (≥ 0.1 mm)	10.1	8.2	8.8	8.9	9.0	10.2	15.1	15.0	9.6	6.8	8.8	10.2	120.7
Average snowy days	9.9	6.3	2.4	0.3	0.0	0.0	0.0	0.0	0.0	0.0	1.1	8.4	28.4
Average relative humidity (%)	65.7	61.6	60.3	60.2	64.5	72.0	79.8	78.0	73.6	67.6	66.9	66.9	68.1
Mean monthly sunshine hours	161.4	170.5	201.0	214.1	227.9	169.9	143.1	169.0	174.4	208.5	167.4	156.9	2,164.1
Percentage possible sunshine	51.1	53.4	51.8	54.3	51.3	39.0	32.9	41.4	46.3	58.5	52.7	51.1	48.0
Average ultraviolet index	2	2	3	4	5	5	7	6	5	3	3	2	4
Source 1: Korea Meteorological Administration (percent sunshine 1981–2010)
Source 2: Weather Atlas (UV)

== Education ==
Chonnam National University, Gwangju Institute of Science and Technology, and Gwangju Education University are public universities in Gwangju.

Honam University, Gwangju University, Gwangshin University, Gwangju Women's University, Nambu University, Chosun University, and Honam Christian University are private universities.

Gwangju Health University is a private community college offering associate degrees in humanities and social sciences and healthcare sciences, and a bachelor's degree in nursing.

Gwangju has 593 schools, consisting of 234 kindergartens, 145 elementary schools, 84 middle schools, 65 high schools, 1 science high school, 7 junior colleges, 9 universities, 38 graduate schools, and 11 others (as of 1 May 2009) with a total of 406,669 students, or 28.5% of the total city population. The average number of students per household is 0.8.

== Transportation ==
The city is served by the Gwangju Subway. An extension was completed in April 2008, with the remainder being completed in 2012. The first phase of a second line, which, when completed, will be an orbital loop line, will open in 2026. There are two KTX stations in the city: Gwangju station and Gwangju Songjeong Station. Gwangju Songjeong Station connects to the Gwangju Subway and the local bus system. Now, the Songjeong station is mainly used.

Gwangju has an extensive system of public buses that traverse the city. Bus stops and buses themselves contain stop information in Korean and English. Local buses, but not the subway or KTX, connect to the intercity Gwangju Bus Terminal known as U-Square.

Gwangju is also served by the Gwangju Airport.

== Tourism ==
- Asia Culture Center – The Asia Culture Center (also known as the ACC) is a facility in downtown Gwangju designed to celebrate and explore Gwangju's artistic and democratic culture and history, as well as provide space to host exhibits, experiences, and events from international artists. It is built primarily below street level, though its design incorporates large amounts of natural lighting. There are five facilities: ACC Exchange, ACC Theater, ACC Creation, ACC Archive & Research, and ACC Children
- Gwangju Biennale – This is a modern art festival that is held every two years. It was first launched in 1995. The Gwangju Biennale Exhibition Hall is at the Jung-oe Park Culture Center and the Science Center.
- Gwangju Culture & Art Center – The center regularly hosts events.
- Gwangju Hyanggyo (Confucian School) – Gwangju Hyanggyo is in the Gwangju Park in Sa-dong. There are traditional houses here estimated as having been built during the 1st year of the Joseon period in 1392. This school continues to hold memorial ceremonies for Confucius twice a year. Admission is free.
- Gwangju National Museum – The museum houses a permanent collection of historical art and cultural relics that date back to the old Joseon and Goryeo periods of Korean history. The museum also organizes exhibitions and cultural learning activities that are open to the public.
- Gwangju 5.18 Road is the course about the Democracy Movement of 1980. The courses include the historical places.
- May 18th National Cemetery
- Food streets – Gwangju has numerous designated Food Streets where multiple restaurants serving dishes renowned to Gwangju can be found. These include Mudeungsan Boribap Street (a meal of barley with a variety of side dishes), Duck Cook Street (oritang, a duck stew, and grilled duck), Folk Tteokgalbi Street (a meal of grilled minced pork or beef patties eaten wrapped in lettuce and served with ox bone soup and a variety of side dishes) and Kotgejang Baekban Street (a meal of crabs preserved in soy sauce served with a variety of side dishes).
- Gwangju World Cup Stadium – It is a historical place for Korean soccer history. Because at this stadium in 2002 FIFA World Cup, South Korea national football team beat Spain soccer team in 3:5 at the quarter-Final, and advanced to the Semi-Final match with Germany in that World Cup, for the first time in the Asian soccer history.

== Sport and culture ==
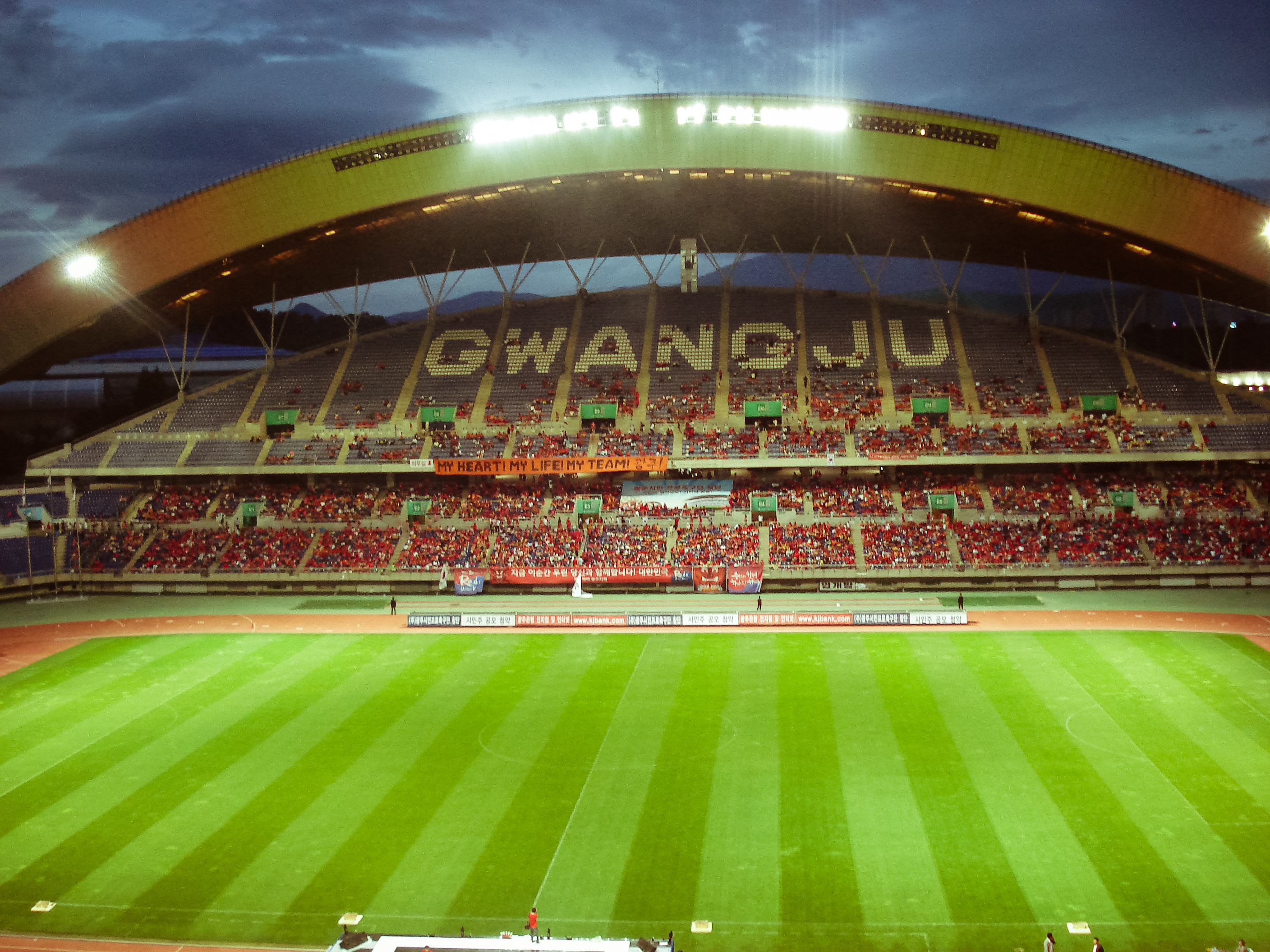
Gwangju World Cup Stadium.

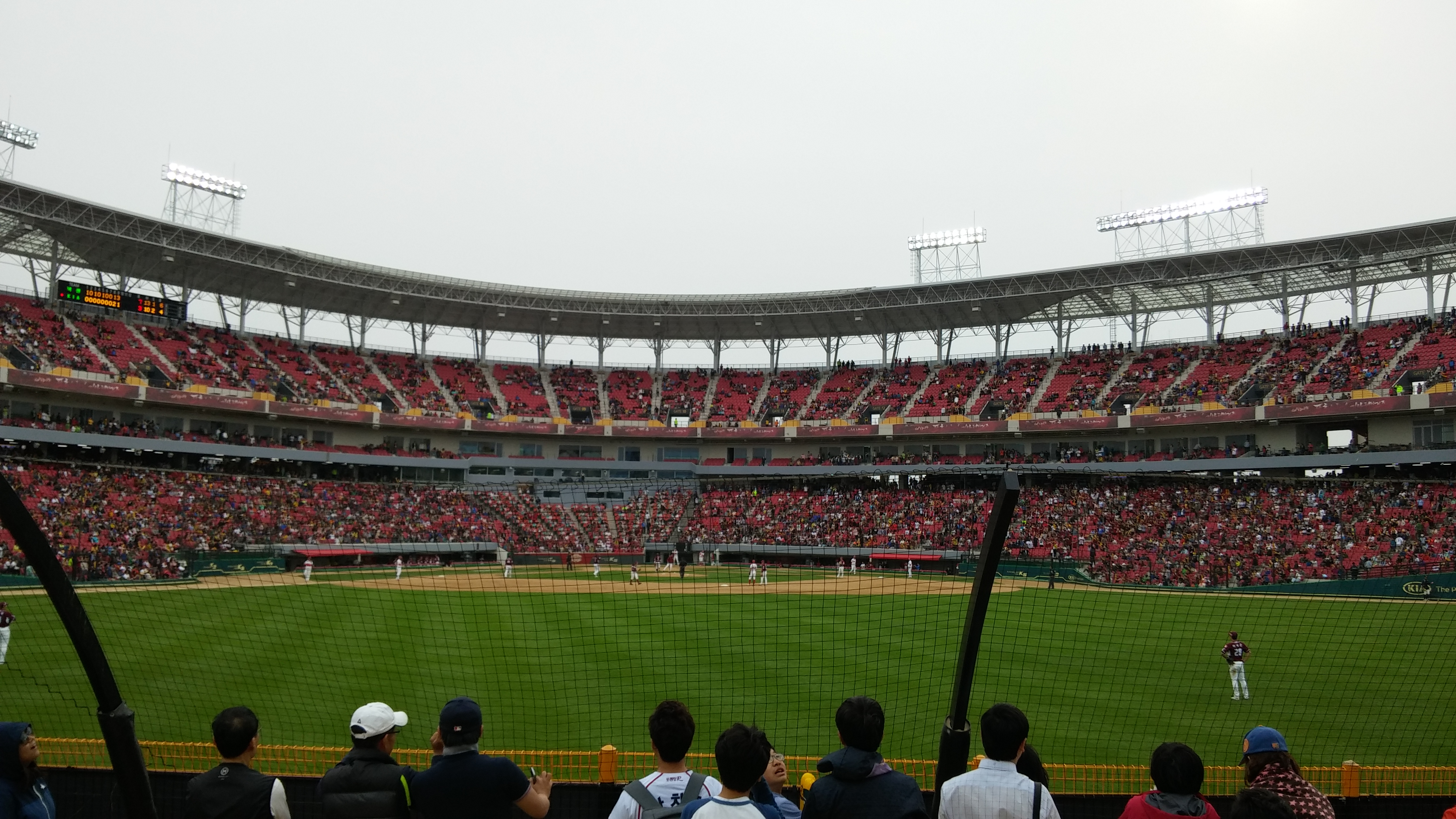
Gwangju-Kia Champions Field, home field of Kia Tigers.

- It is the home of Kia Tigers of the Korea Professional Baseball League (KBO).
- 2002 FIFA World Cup – Gwangju World Cup Stadium was one of the venues used for the World Cup and was where the South Korea national football team advanced to the semi-finals for the first time in its history by defeating Spain.
- It is the home of Gwangju FC of the K League.
- Universiade – It was the venue for the 2015 Summer Universiade games.
- The 3rd Asia Song Festival an annual Asian pop music festival hosted by the Korea Foundation for International Culture Exchange, in 2006, was held at the Gwangju World Cup Stadium.
- The International Design Alliance (IDA) appointed Gwangju as the host destination of the 2015 IDA Congress.
- Festivals are held in Gwangju. (List of festivals in Gwangju)
- 2019 FINA World Aquatics Championships
- 2014 Gwangju ACE Fair (Asia Content & Entertainment Fair)
- The Ministry of SMEs said Gwangju was selected as the site for the creation of the "Green-Startup-Town." It is said that it will benchmark King's Cross Station, a successful case of urban regeneration in the UK, to establish a start-up hub (private research institute, research and development company, start-up company, etc.) at Gwangju Station.
- It is the home of Gwangju AI Peppers of the V-League.

== Cityscape ==
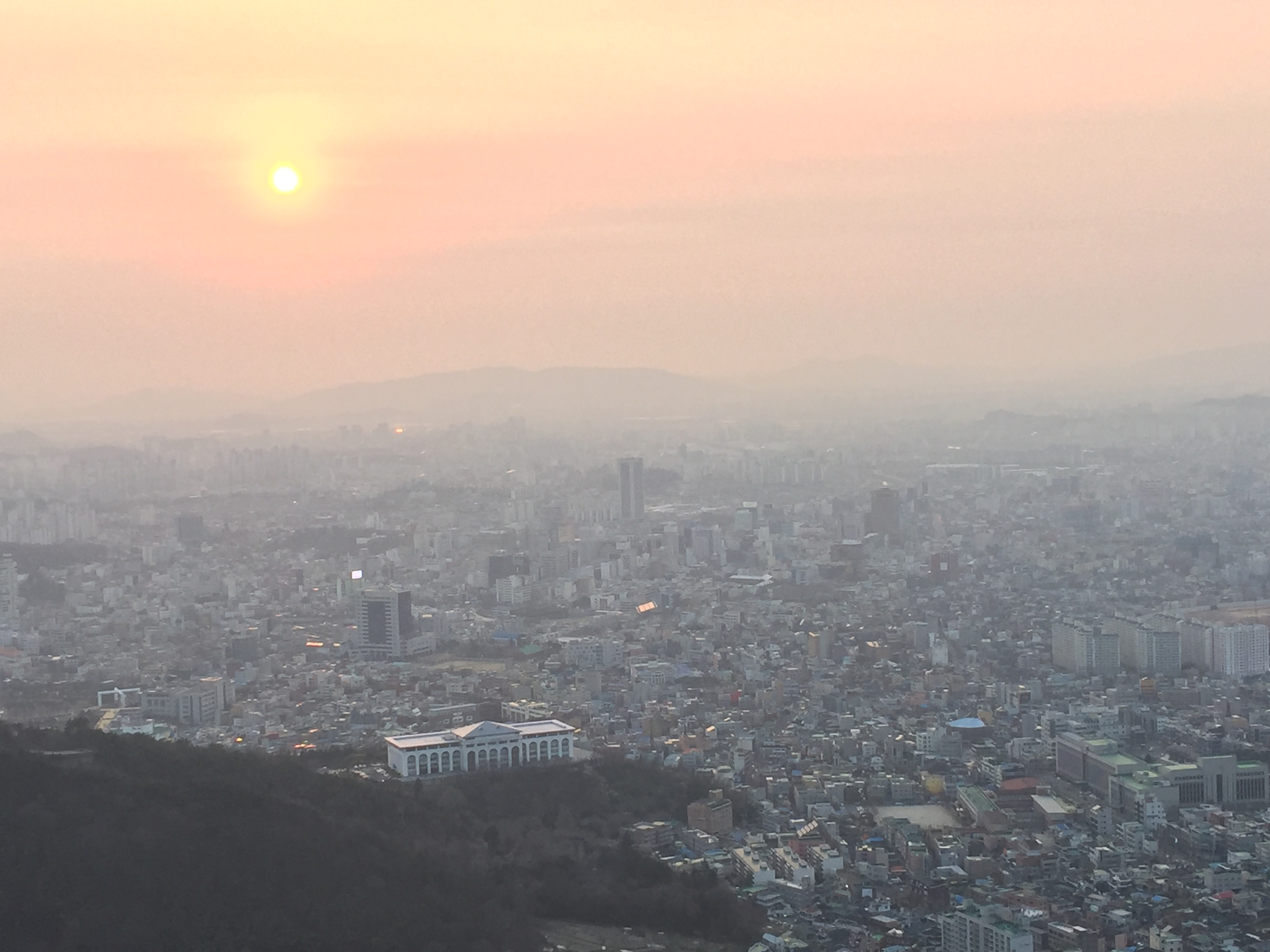
Picture taken from a hill overlooking Gwangju in April 2017.

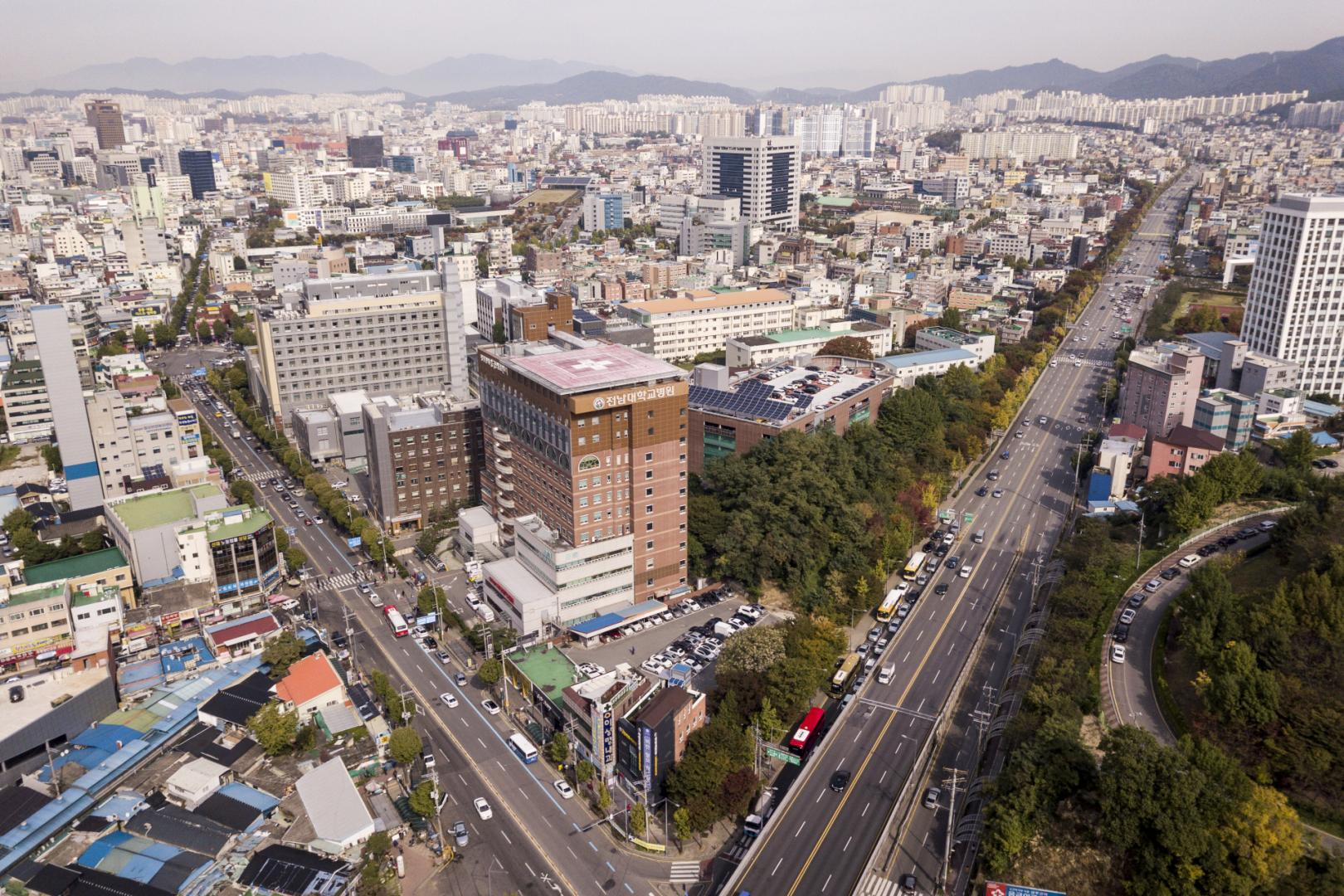
Dong-gu

- Mudeungsan – It is a mountain that is part of Mudeungsan National Park.

== International relations ==
=== Sister cities ===
Gwangju is twinned with:

- Changzhi, China (2014)
- Guangzhou, China (1996)
- Medan, Indonesia (1997)
- Nghệ An, Vietnam (2022)
- San Antonio, United States (1982)
- Sendai, Japan (2002)
- Tainan, Taiwan (1968)
- Vancouver, Canada (2004)

=== Partnerships and cooperations ===
- Huế, Vietnam
- Turin, Italy
- Seberang Perai, Malaysia (2013)

== Notable people ==
=== Art ===
- Chong Ryul-song – author of the Military Anthem of the People's Liberation Army of China

=== Literature ===
- Han Kang – author of The Vegetarian and Human Acts and winner of the 2024 Nobel Prize in Literature

=== Entertainers ===
- Jung Ho-seok (stage name J-Hope) – member of the K-pop group BTS
- Jeong Yun-ho (stage name Yunho) – member of K-pop group ATEEZ
- Han Dong-min (stage name Taesan) – member of K-pop group BoyNextDoor
- Moon Geun-young – South Korean actress and singer
- Lee Seung-hyun (stage name Seungri) – former member of K-pop group Big Bang
- Jung Yun-ho (stage name U-Know) – member of K-pop group TVXQ
- Seo Hye-lin – member of K-pop group EXID
- Lee Gi-kwang – member of K-pop group Highlight
- Lee Sung-jong – member of K-pop group Infinite
- Lee Hyun – singer
- Chae Hyung-won – member of K-pop group Monsta X
- Im Chang-kyun (stage name I.M.) – member of K-pop group Monsta X (originally from Suwon)
- Bae Su-ji (stage name Suzy) – former member of K-pop group Miss A
- Gong Min-ji (stage name Minzy) – member of K-pop group 2NE1
- Ryu Hwa-young – former member of K-pop group T-ara
- Goo Hara – former member of kpop group KARA
- Kim Yu-bin – former member of K-pop group Wonder Girls
- Hong Jin-young – a trot singer
- Park Shin-hye – South Korean actress
- Jung Woo-seok – member of K-pop group Pentagon
- Lee Su-jeong (stage name Babysoul) – leader and member of K-pop group Lovelyz
- Joo Hyun-mi (born 1961) – South Korean trot singer
- Jang Beomjoon (born 1989) – South Korean singer, former member of Busker Busker

=== Sports ===
- Ki Sung-yueng – International footballer
- An San – Olympic gold medalist in women's team, mixed team, and individual archery at the 2021 Tokyo Summer Games
- An Se-young – Badminton Player
- Kim Byung-hyun (born 1979) – South Korean former baseball player
- Kang Jung-ho (born 1987) – South Korean former baseball player
- Moon "Oner" Hyeon-jun (born 2002), professional League of Legends player, Jungler for T1

=== Politics ===
- Chi Hyun Chung – Bolivian politician and presidential candidate for 2019 and 2020 elections
- Elizabeth Lee – Australian politician and Leader of the Opposition of the Australian Capital Territory

=== Science ===
- Yi So-yeon – South Korean biotechnologist and astronaut, the first Korean to fly to space

== See also ==
- Gwangju Castle
- List of cities in South Korea
