= Jeonnam-Gwangju =

Provincial-level city in South Korea

- Special Metropolitan City
- Interim logo

- Country: Republic of Korea
- Region: Honam
- Subdivisions: List: 5 cities ("si"); 5 districts ("gu"); 17 counties ("gun")

Government
  - Mayor: Min Hyung-bae (Democratic)

Area
  - Total: 12,363.1 km^{2} (4,773.4 sq mi)

Population (2026)
  - Total: 3,231,212
  - Density: 261.359/km^{2} (676.918/sq mi)
  - Dialect: Jeolla
- Time zone: UTC+9 (Korea Standard Time)

Korean name
- Hangul: 전남광주통합특별시
- Hanja: 全南光州統合特別市
- RR: Jeonnam-Gwangju-tonghapteukbyeolsi
- MR: Chŏnnam-Kwangju-t'onghapt'ŭkpyŏlsi

Jeonnam-Gwangju (Korean: 전남광주) or Gwangju (광주), officially Jeonnam-Gwangju Special Metropolitan City (전남광주통합특별시; lit. 'Jeonnam-Gwangju Integrated Special City') and officially abbreviated as Gwangju Special City (광주특별시), is a provincial-level city in South Korea.

It was established on July 1, 2026 through the merger of South Jeolla Province and Gwangju Metropolitan City.

== Administrative divisions ==
Jeonnam-Gwangju consists of the same cities, districts, and counties (with the exception of Gwangju Metropolitan City) that were in South Jeolla and Gwangju Metropolitan City. Because Gwangju Metropolitan City was dissolved (it is not a city within Jeonnam-Gwangju), its districts are now direct subdivisions of Jeonnam-Gwangju.

Jeonnam-Gwangju is divided into 5 cities ("-si"), 5 districts ("-gu") and 17 counties ("-gun").

Map	Name	Hangul	Hanja	Population (2025)	Area (km^{2})	Population density 2025 (per km^{2})	Subdivisions
— City —
Suncheon	Suncheon	순천시	順天市	271,415	911.06 km^{2}	297.91/km^{2}	1 eup, 10 myeon, 13 haengjeong-dong, 33 beopjeong-dong
Yeosu	Yeosu	여수시	麗水市	262,133	512.34 km^{2}	511.64/km^{2}	1 eup, 6 myeon, 20 haengjeong-dong, 51 beopjeong-dong
Mokpo	Mokpo	목포시	木浦市	208,883	51.73 km^{2}	4,037.95/km^{2}	23 haengjeong-dong, 64 beopjeong-dong
Gwangyang	Gwangyang	광양시	光陽市	151,710	464.81 km^{2}	326.39/km^{2}	1 eup, 6 myeon, 5 haengjeong-dong, 10 beopjeong-dong
Naju	Naju	나주시	羅州市	120,095	608.46 km^{2}	197.38/km^{2}	1 eup, 12 myeon, 7 haengjeong-dong, 34 beopjeong-dong
— District —
Buk District, Jeonnam-Gwangju	Buk District	북구	北區	428,572	120.26 km^{2}	3,563.71/km^{2}	27 haengjeong-dong, 41 beopjeong-dong
Gwangsan District	Gwangsan District	광산구	光山區	408,705	222.69 km^{2}	1,835.31/km^{2}	21 haengjeong-dong, 79 beopjeong-dong
Seo District, Jeonnam-Gwangju	Seo District	서구	西區	274,627	47.73 km^{2}	5,753.76/km^{2}	18 haengjeong-dong, 18 beopjeong-dong
Dong District, Jeonnam-Gwangju	Dong District	동구	東區	110,816	49.32 km^{2}	2,246.88/km^{2}	13 haengjeong-dong, 34 beopjeong-dong
Nam District, Jeonnam-Gwangju	Nam District	남구	南區	209,183	60.96 km^{2}	3,431.48/km^{2}	17 haengjeong-dong, 30 beopjeong-dong
— County —
Muan County	Muan County	무안군	務安郡	96,132	451.32 km^{2}	213.00/km^{2}	3 eup, 6 myeon
Haenam County	Haenam County	해남군	海南郡	62,765	1,045.16 km^{2}	60.05/km^{2}	1 eup, 13 myeon
Yeongam County	Yeongam County	영암군	靈巖郡	59,264	612.42 km^{2}	96.77/km^{2}	2 eup, 9 myeon
Hwasun County	Hwasun County	화순군	和順郡	58,994	787.18 km^{2}	74.94/km^{2}	1 eup, 12 myeon
Goheung County	Goheung County	고흥군	高興郡	58,771	807.21 km^{2}	72.81/km^{2}	2 eup, 14 myeon
Yeonggwang County	Yeonggwang County	영광군	靈光郡	51,585	474.52 km^{2}	108.71/km^{2}	3 eup, 8 myeon
Wando County	Wando County	완도군	莞島郡	47,524	396.87 km^{2}	119.75/km^{2}	3 eup, 9 myeon
Damyang County	Damyang County	담양군	潭陽郡	43,202	455.07 km^{2}	94.93/km^{2}	1 eup, 11 myeon
Jangseong County	Jangseong County	장성군	長城郡	41,142	518.27 km^{2}	79.38/km^{2}	1 eup, 10 myeon
Sinan County	Sinan County	신안군	新安郡	37,564	656.28 km^{2}	57.24/km^{2}	2 eup, 12 myeon
Boseong County	Boseong County	보성군	寶城郡	36,133	664.69 km^{2}	54.36/km^{2}	2 eup, 10 myeon
Jangheung County	Jangheung County	장흥군	長興郡	33,310	622.38 km^{2}	53.52/km^{2}	3 eup, 7 myeon
Gangjin County	Gangjin County	강진군	康津郡	30,872	500.88 km^{2}	61.64/km^{2}	1 eup, 10 myeon
Jindo County	Jindo County	진도군	珍島郡	29,440	440.11 km^{2}	66.89/km^{2}	1 eup, 6 myeon
Hampyeong County	Hampyeong County	함평군	咸平郡	29,013	392.06 km^{2}	74.00/km^{2}	1 eup, 8 myeon
Gokseong County	Gokseong County	곡성군	谷城郡	26,105	547.34 km^{2}	47.69/km^{2}	1 eup, 10 myeon
Gurye County	Gurye County	구례군	求禮郡	22,493	442.96 km^{2}	50.78/km^{2}	1 eup, 7 myeon
