= Uncheon Station =

Uncheon Station (Korean: 운천역; Hanja: 雲泉驛) is the name of two railroad stations in South Korea.

- Uncheon station (Paju)
- Uncheon station (Gwangju)
