= Hwajeong station =

Hwajeong station (Korean: 화정역) may refer to the following railroad stations in South Korea.

- Hwajeong station (Goyang)
- Hwajeong station (Gwangju)
