= Ssangchon station =

Metro station in Gwangju, South Korea

111 쌍촌 Ssangchon
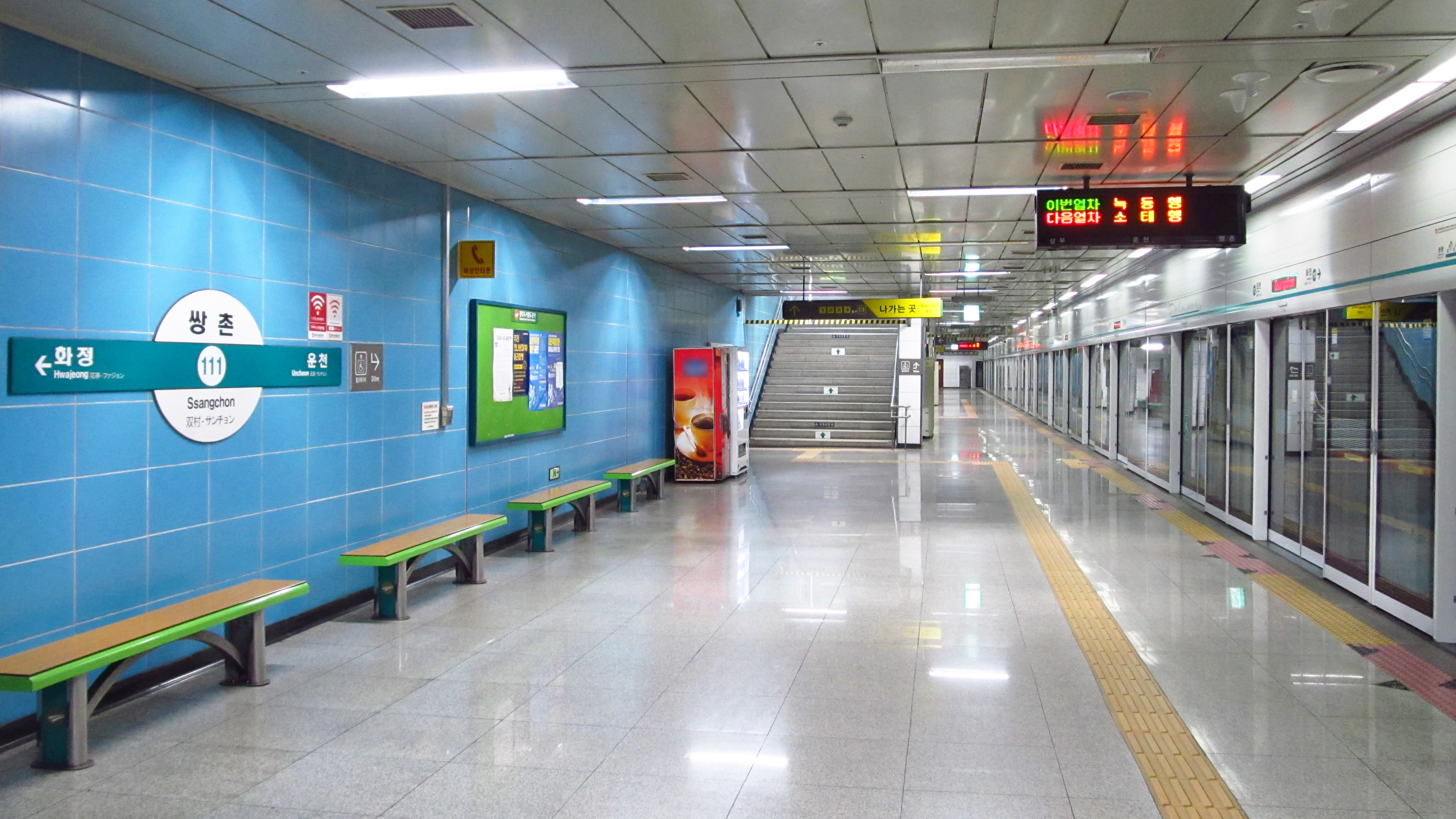
- Station platform

Korean name
- Hangul: 쌍촌역
- Hanja: 雙村驛
- Revised Romanization: Ssangchon yeok
- McCune–Reischauer: Ssangch'on yŏk

General information
- Location: Ssangchon-dong, Seo District, Gwangju; South Korea
- Coordinates: 35°09′06″N 126°52′10″E
- Operator: Gwangju Metropolitan Rapid Transit Corporation
- Line: Line 1
- Platforms: 2
- Tracks: 2

Construction
- Structure type: Underground

Other information
- Station code: 111

History
- Opened: April 28, 2004

Services
| Preceding station | Gwangju Metro | Following station |
|---|---|---|
| Hwajeong towards Nokdong | Line 1 | Uncheon towards Pyeongdong |
Location

Ssangchon station (Korean: 쌍촌역; Hanja: 雙村驛) is a station of Gwangju Metro Line 1 in Ssangchon-dong, Seo District, Gwangju, South Korea.

== Station layout ==
| G | Street Level | Exits |
| L1 | Concourse | Faregates, Ticketing Machines, Station Control |
| L2; Platforms | Side platform, doors will open on the right |
| L2; Platforms | Southbound | ← Line 1 toward Nokdong (Hwajeong) |
| L2; Platforms | Northbound | → Line 1 toward Pyeongdong (Uncheon) → |
| L2; Platforms | Side platform, doors will open on the right |

== Exits ==
| Exit No. | Image | Destinations |
|---|---|---|
| 1 | | Gwangju World Cup Stadium, Gwangju Hwajeong Elementary School, Jeonnam Regional Police Agency Kidong University, Gwangju Metropolitan City Institute for Health and Environment, Jang Sung-gang Orthopedic Surgery, Kim Kyung-Ok Gynecology |
| 2 | | Seogwangju Post Office, Sangmu Mayor, Catholic University Lifelong Education Center, Ssangchon City Apartment, Ilsin Apartment, Saebright Church, Yeongsan River Building, NACF Ssangchondong Branch |
| 3 | | Sangmu 1-dong Administrative Welfare Center, Seogwang Elementary School, Hyundai Apartment, Sincheon Hilltop, Lakeside Regencyville |
| 4 | | Haitai Apartment |
