= Hwajeong station (Jeonnam-Gwangju) =

Metro station in Gwangju, South Korea

110 화정 Hwajeong
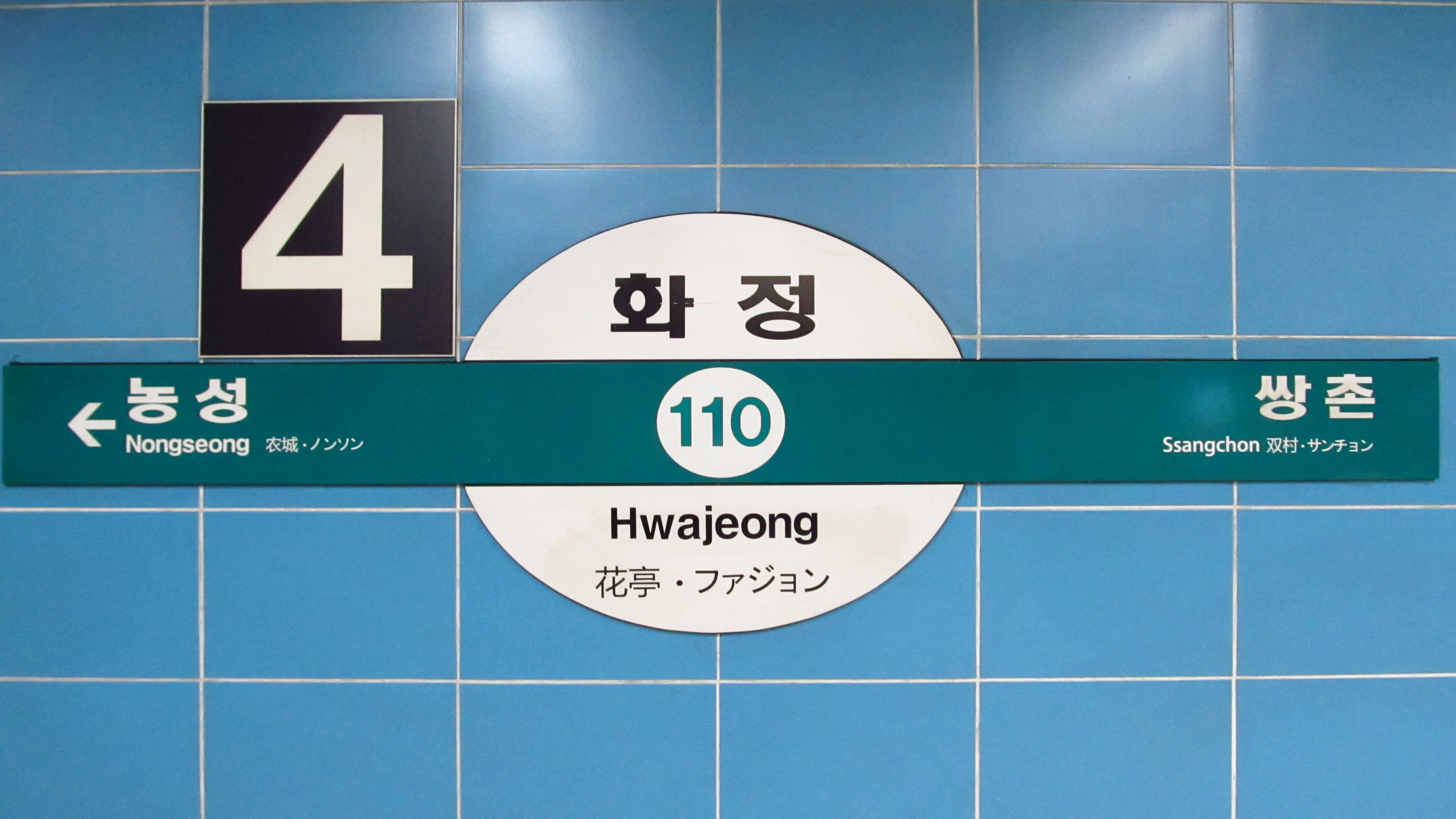

Korean name
- Hangul: 화정역
- Hanja: 花亭驛
- Revised Romanization: Hwajeong yeok
- McCune–Reischauer: Hwachŏng yŏk

General information
- Location: Hwajeong-dong, Seo District, Gwangju; South Korea
- Coordinates: 35°09′07″N 126°52′36″E
- Operator: Gwangju Metropolitan Rapid Transit Corporation
- Line: Line 1
- Platforms: 2
- Tracks: 2

Construction
- Structure type: Underground

Other information
- Station code: 110

History
- Opened: April 28, 2004

Services
Preceding station	Gwangju Metro	Following station
Nongseong towards Nokdong	Line 1	Ssangchon towards Pyeongdong
Location

Hwajeong station (Korean: 화정역) is a station of Gwangju Metro Line 1 in Hwajeong-dong, Seo District, Gwangju, South Korea.

== Station layout ==
G	Street Level	Exits
L1	Concourse	Faregates, Ticketing Machines, Station Control
L2; Platforms	Side platform, doors will open on the right
L2; Platforms	Southbound	← Line 1 toward Nokdong (Nongseong)
L2; Platforms	Northbound	→ Line 1 toward Pyeongdong (Ssangchon) →
L2; Platforms	Side platform, doors will open on the right

== Exits ==
Exit No.	Image	Destinations
1		Gwangju Seoseok Middle & High School, Universiade Hill State, Internal Medicine, Dana Dermatology Clinic, Heo Sung Hee Otolaryngology
2		Gwangju Metropolitan Office of Education, Jeonnam Provincial Police Agency Mobile University, Jeonnam Road Safety Management Office, Gwangju Central Church
3		Gwangju Metropolitan City Fire Safety Headquarters, Western Police Station Jungbu District, Naebangdong Jugong Apartment, Hyundai Apartment, Jaseongsa Temple
4		Hwajeong 1-dong Administrative Welfare Center, Gwangju Seo Elementary School, Gwangju Bank Seogwangju Branch, Daeju Accounting Corporation, Gwangju General Bus Terminal, Western Police Station Hwajeong Police Box
