= Uncheon station (Jeonnam-Gwangju) =

Metro station in Gwangju, South Korea

112 운천 Uncheon
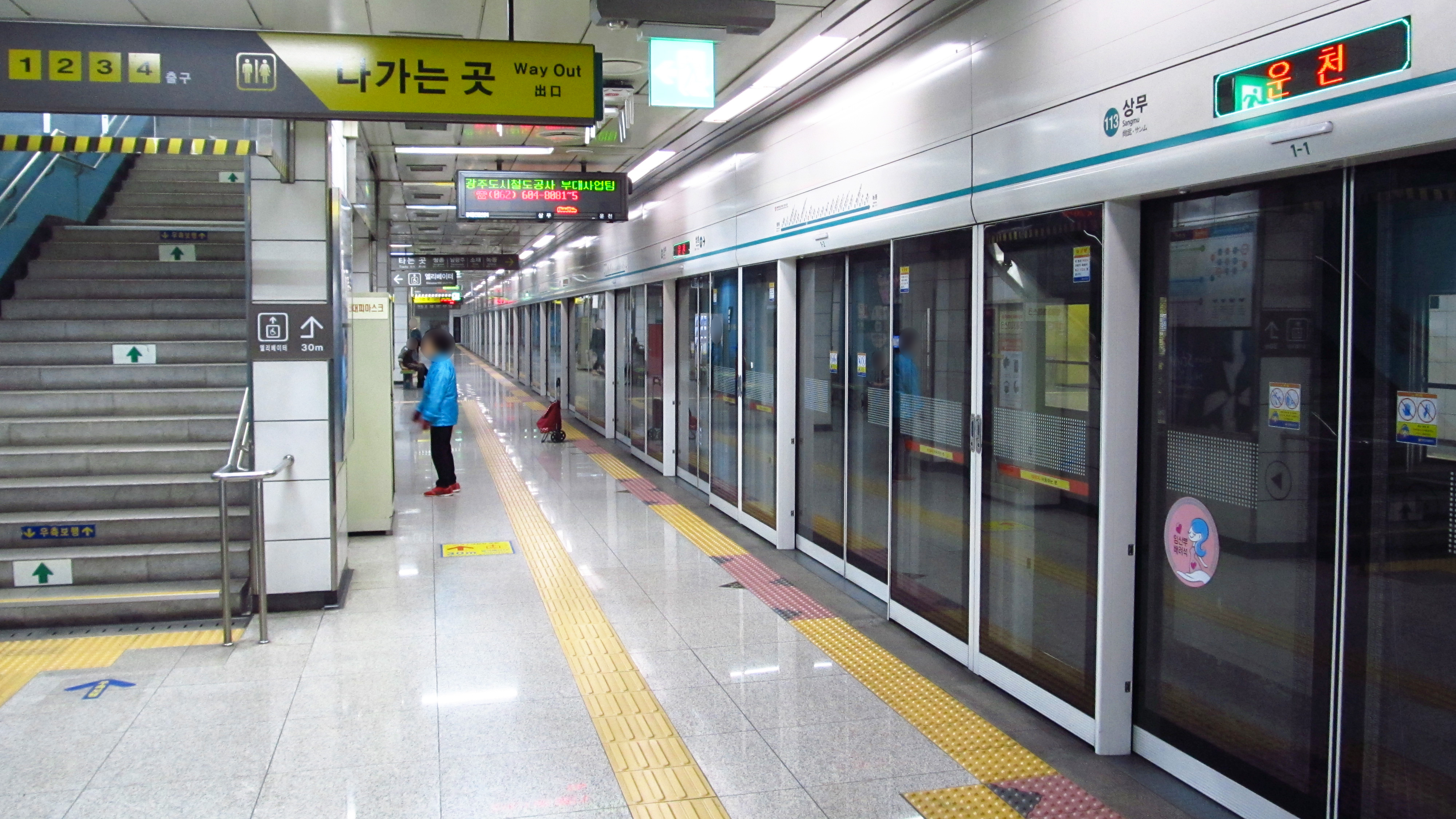

Korean name
- Hangul: 운천역
- Hanja: 雲泉驛
- Revised Romanization: Uncheon yeok
- McCune–Reischauer: Uhch'ŏn yŏk

General information
- Location: Ssangchon-dong, Seo District, Gwangju; South Korea
- Coordinates: 35°09′02″N 126°51′31″E
- Operator: Gwangju Metropolitan Rapid Transit Corporation
- Line: Line 1
- Platforms: 2
- Tracks: 2

Construction
- Structure type: Underground

Other information
- Station code: 112

History
- Opened: April 28, 2004

Services
Preceding station	Gwangju Metro	Following station
Ssangchon towards Nokdong	Line 1	Sangmu towards Pyeongdong
Location

Uncheon station (Korean: 운천역; Hanja: 雲泉驛) is a station of Gwangju Metro Line 1 in Ssangchon-dong, Seo District, Gwangju, South Korea.

== Station name ==
The station was originally known as Honam University Entrance Station were the Honam University is nearby and later it was decided to rename as Uncheon (Honam University Entrance) Station. On April 22, 2015, the name of the station was rename into Uncheon Station as the Honam University Ssangchon Campus was integrated with the Mining Campus.

== Station layout ==
G	Street Level	Exits
L1	Concourse	Faregates, Ticketing Machines, Station Control
L2; Platforms	Side platform, doors will open on the right
L2; Platforms	Southbound	← Line 1 toward Nokdong (Ssangchon)
L2; Platforms	Northbound	→ Line 1 toward Pyeongdong (Sangmu) →
L2; Platforms	Side platform, doors will open on the right

== Exits ==
Exit No.	Image	Destinations
1		Sangmu Market, Gwangju Hyogwang Middle School, Yongsan Green Apartment, Gwangju Bank Ssangchon-dong Branch, Saebright Church
2		Uncheon Reservoir, Sangmu Middle School, Chipyeong Middle School, Myeongji Apartment, Hyundai Obstetrics and Gynecology
3		May 18 Memorial Park, Gwangju Student Education and Culture Center, Mugaksa Temple, Lotte Mart, Megabox
4		Gwangju Regional Tax Office, Gwangju Customs, Honam University Ssangchon Campus, Sangmu High School, Myeongji Mansion
