= List of capitals in South Korea =

National and provincial capitals of South Korea

This is a list of capital cities, including the legislature or seat of government, of South Korea and its current provinces and provincial-level cities.

== National capital ==
Seoul has been the capital of South Korea since the Division of Korea in 1945. On 20 December 1997 some offices of the national government were moved to the Daejeon Government Complex to offset the unbalance developments around Sudogwon. In 2004, former President Roh Moo-hyun proposed plans to move the national capital further away from the Korean Demilitarized Zone. However, disputes within the National Assembly and ruling of the Constitutional Court of Korea prevented the relocation. On 2 July 2012 some governmental functions were moved to Sejong, which became the de facto administrative capital of South Korea.

== Provincial capitals ==
Capital	Provincial division	Region	ISO	Status
Andong	North Gyeongsang	Yeongnam	KR-47	City
Busan (Yeonje)*	Busan	Yeongnam	KR-26	Metropolitan city
Changwon	South Gyeongsang	Yeongnam	KR-48	Specific city
Cheongju	North Chungcheong	Hoseo	KR-43	Specific city
Chuncheon	Gangwon	Gwandong	KR-42	City
Daegu (Jung)*	Daegu	Yeongnam	KR-27	Metropolitan city
Daejeon (Seo)*	Daejeon	Hoseo	KR-30	Metropolitan city
Gwangju (Seo)*	Gwangju	Honam	KR-29	Metropolitan city
Hongseong	South Chungcheong	Hoseo	KR-44	County
Incheon (Namdong)*	Incheon	Sudogwon	KR-28	Metropolitan city
Jeju	Jeju	Jejudo	KR-49	Administrative city
Jeonju	North Jeolla	Honam	KR-45	Specific city
Muan	South Jeolla	Honam	KR-46	County
Sejong (Boram)*	Sejong	Hoseo	KR-50	Metropolitan autonomous city
Seoul (Jung)*	Seoul	Sudogwon	KR-11	Special city
Suwon	Gyeonggi	Sudogwon	KR-41	Specific city
Ulsan (Nam)*	Ulsan	Yeongnam	KR-31	Metropolitan city

== Claimed provincial capitals ==
Capital	Provincial division	Region	Status
Cheongjin	Hambuk	Gwanbuk	City
Haeju	Hwanghae	Haeseo	City
Hamheung	Hamnam	Gwannam	City
Pyeongyang	Pyeongnam	Gwanseo	City
Sinuiju	Pyeongbuk	Gwanseo	City
