= Myeongjang station =

Station of the Busan Metro

406 명장 Myeongjang
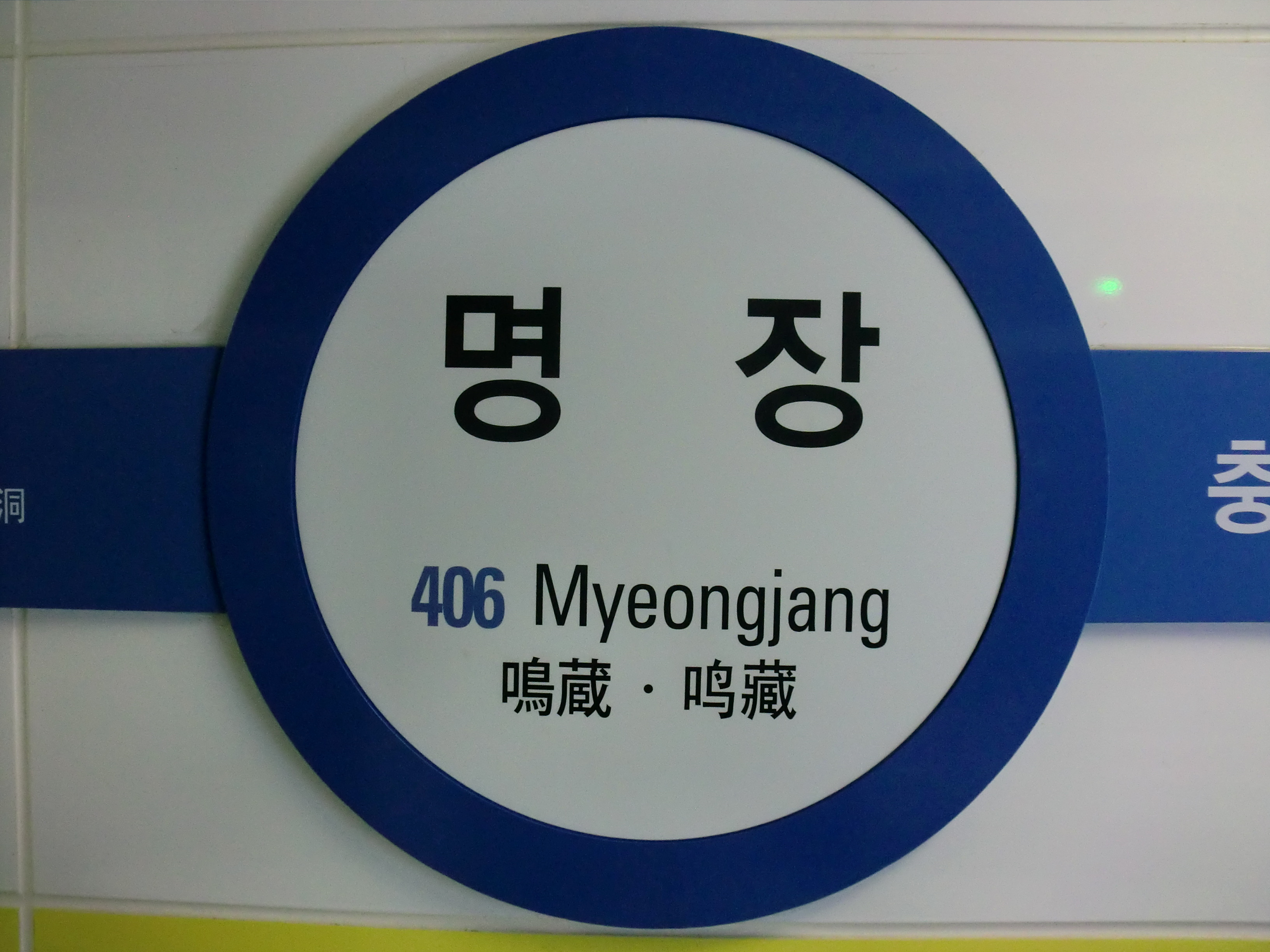

Korean name
- Hangul: 명장역
- Hanja: 鳴蔵驛
- Revised Romanization: Myeongjang yeok
- McCune–Reischauer: Myŏngchang yŏk

General information
- Location: Allak-dong, Dongnae District, Busan; South Korea
- Coordinates: 35.2054°N 129.1018°E
- Operator: Busan Transportation Corporation
- Line: Line 4
- Platforms: 2
- Tracks: 2

Construction
- Structure type: Underground

Other information
- Station code: 406

History
- Opened: March 30, 2011

Services
Preceding station	Busan Metro	Following station
Chungnyeolsa towards Minam	Line 4	Seo-dong towards Anpyeong
Location

Myeongjang Station (Korean: 명장역; Hanja: 鳴蔵驛) is an underground station of Busan Metro Line 4 in Allak-dong, Dongnae District, Busan, South Korea.

== Station Layout ==
G	Street level	Exit

L1; Concourse	Lobby	Customer Service, Shops, Vending machines, ATMs

L2; Platforms	Side platform, doors will open on the right
L2; Platforms	Southbound	← Line 4 toward Minam (Chungnyeolsa)
L2; Platforms	Northbound	Line 4 toward Anpyeong (Seo-dong) →
L2; Platforms	Side platform, doors will open on the right

== Vicinity ==
- Exit 1: Chaoyang A
- Exit 2: Baskin-Robbins
- Exit 3: Chaoyang A
- Exit 4: Pork Soup
