= Chungnyeolsa station =

Metro station in Busan, South Korea

405 충렬사 (안락·부산항운병원) Chungnyeolsa (Allak·Busan Hangun Hospital)
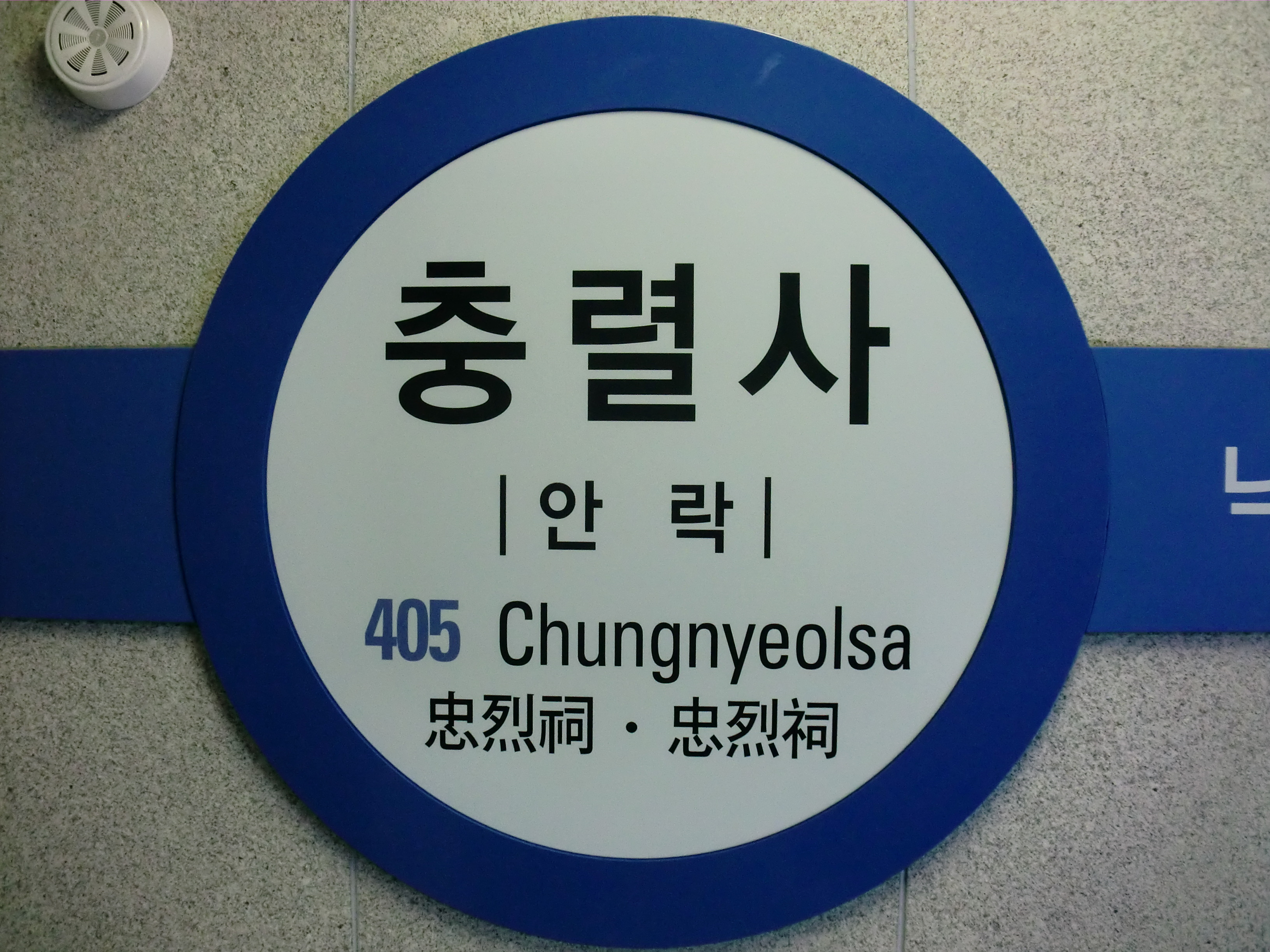

Korean name
- Hangul: 충렬사역
- Hanja: 忠烈祠驛
- Revised Romanization: Chungnyeolsa-yeok
- McCune–Reischauer: Ch'ungnyŏlsa-yŏk

General information
- Location: Allak-dong, Dongnae District, Busan; South Korea
- Coordinates: 35.1998°N 129.0976°E
- Operator: Busan Transportation Corporation
- Line: Line 4
- Platforms: 2
- Tracks: 2

Construction
- Structure type: Underground

Other information
- Station code: 405

History
- Opened: March 30, 2011

Services
Preceding station	Busan Metro	Following station
Nangmin towards Minam	Line 4	Myeongjang towards Anpyeong
Location

Chungnyeolsa Station (Korean: 충렬사역; Hanja: 忠烈祠驛) is an underground station of the Busan Metro Line 4 in Allak-dong, Dongnae District, Busan, South Korea.

== Station Layout ==
G	Street level	Exit

L1; Concourse	Lobby	Customer Service, Shops, Vending machines, ATMs

L2; Platforms	Side platform, doors will open on the right
L2; Platforms	Southbound	← Line 4 toward Minam (Nangmin)
L2; Platforms	Northbound	→ Line 4 toward Anpyeong (Myeongjang)
L2; Platforms	Side platform, doors will open on the right

== Vicinity ==
- Exit 1: Dongnae Police Station Chungryeol District
- Exit 2: Jinsong Sushi
- Exit 3: The Camp Busan Branch
- Exit 4:
