= List of districts and counties of Incheon =

Incheon is divided into 9 districts (gu) and 2 counties (gun).

== Districts and counties ==
Name	Hanja	Population (2019)	Area (km^{2})
Jemulpo District	濟物浦區	99,223	
Yeongjong District	永宗區	137,103	
Michuhol District	彌鄒忽區	412,471	24.8
Yeonsu District	延壽區	357,244	54.9
Namdong District	南洞區	534,871	57.1
Bupyeong District	富平區	517,029	32.0
Gyeyang District	桂陽區	306,613	45.6
Seohae District	西海區	391,854	69.25
Geomdan District	黔丹區	271,021	49.77
Ganghwa County	江華郡	69,130	411.4
Ongjin County	甕津郡	20,714	172.9
Incheon	仁川廣域市	2,956,828	1,063.1

== See also ==
- Incheon
- Administrative divisions of South Korea
