= Dongnae Halmae Pajeon =

Restaurant in Busan, South Korea

Restaurant information
- Established: 1940s
- Location: 43-10, Myeongnyun-ro 94beongil, Dongnae District, Busan, South Korea
- Coordinates: 35.2045°N 129.0838°E
- Website: www.dongnaepajeon.co.kr/index_en.php (in English)

Dongnae Halmae Pajeon (Korean: 동래할매파전), or Dongrae Halmae Pajun, is a historic Korean restaurant in Busan, South Korea. The restaurant opened in the 1940s, and has remained family owned since then; by 2024 it was on its fourth generation of owners. It specializes and is named for the scallion seafood pancake dish haemul pajeon.

The restaurant has its origins from a stall in Busan's Dongnae Market in the 1920s. The Dongnae area was once reputed for the scallions that it grew; as land became more expensive in the area, it eventually came to no longer grow scallions. The founder of the restaurant sold pajeon, and eventually grew successful enough to establish a store, which she did in either the 1940s or 1950s. The restaurant is reportedly somewhat difficult to find, as it is located in an alleyway. Regardless, the restaurant reportedly has a loyal base of regular customers, and has persisted in that location since. The restaurant was rebuilt in 2006. It also reportedly received an offer to convert it into a chain, but the owners reportedly refused with the concern that the restaurant's original taste may become diluted or lost.

The restaurant's pajeon is reportedly of an older style that is uncommon elsewhere. The scallions are served uncut and whole; they are laid in parallel to form a thin sheet. A large portion of seafood is laid on top. Then a small amount of batter is applied; it serves as an adhesive for the scallions and seafood. By contrast, many other restaurants have served crispier pajeon with more batter; the store owner reportedly considered changing their recipe but decided against it, in order to preserve the restaurant's traditional taste. The restaurant sells a meal kit with instructions for how to create its variant of the dish at home.

The restaurant reportedly holds Korean traditional music performances every Friday. It is reportedly popular with tourists on that day.
