= Nangmin station =

Station of the Busan Metro

404 낙민 Nangmin
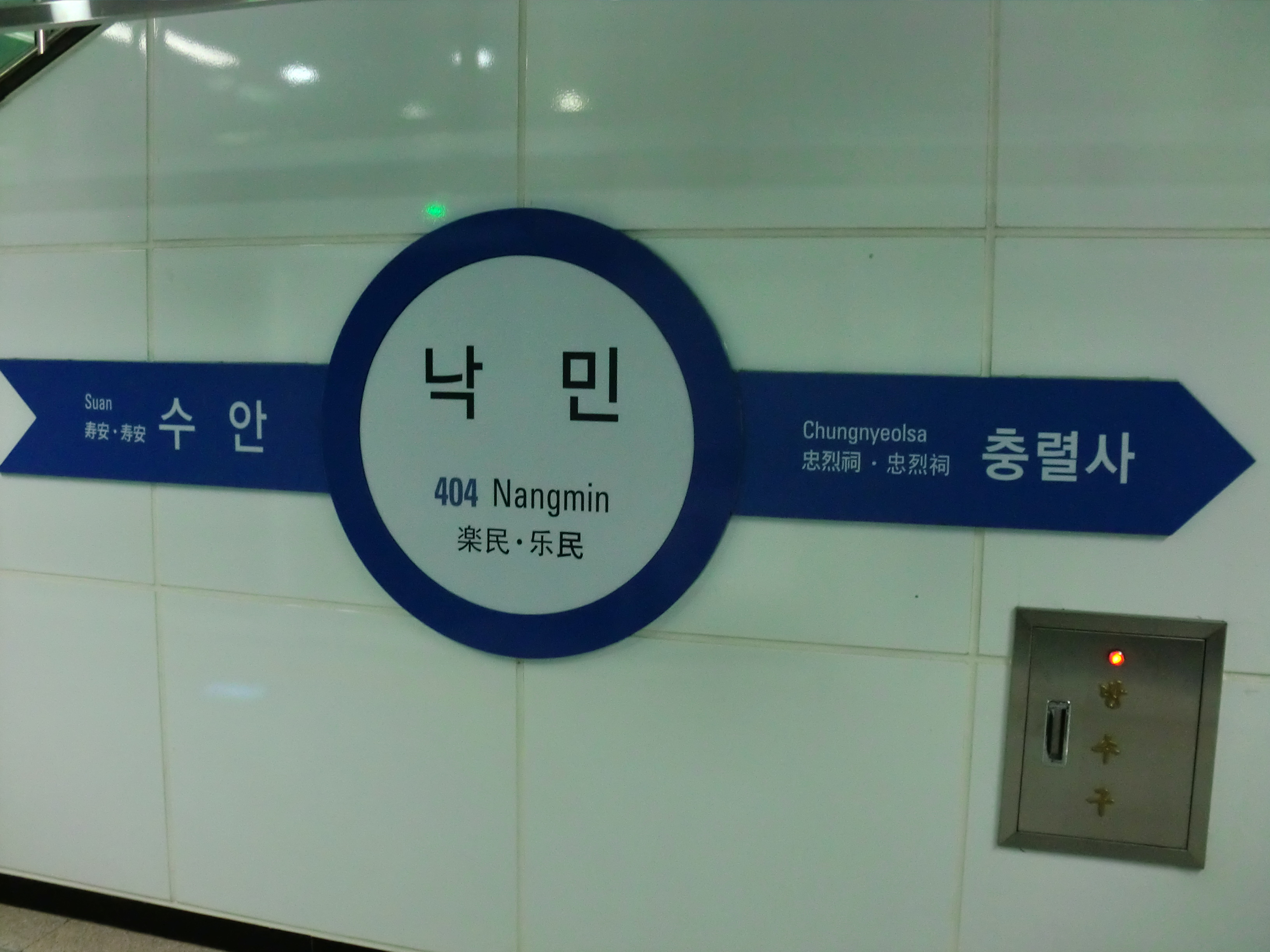

Korean name
- Hangul: 낙민역
- Hanja: 樂民驛
- Revised Romanization: Nakmin yeok
- McCune–Reischauer: Nakmin yŏk

General information
- Location: Nangmin-dong, Dongnae District, Busan; South Korea
- Coordinates: 35.2002°N 129.0908°E
- Operator: Busan Transportation Corporation
- Line: Line 4
- Platforms: 2
- Tracks: 2

Construction
- Structure type: Underground

Other information
- Station code: 404

History
- Opened: March 30, 2011

Services
| Preceding station | Busan Metro | Following station |
|---|---|---|
| Suan towards Minam | Line 4 | Chungnyeolsa towards Anpyeong |
Location

Nangmin Station (Korean: 낙민역; Hanja: 樂民驛) is an underground station of Busan Metro Line 4 in Nangmin-dong, Dongnae District, Busan, South Korea.

While not directly connected, it is in close proximity to Dongnae Station of the Donghae Line.

== Station Layout ==
| G | Street level | Exit |

| L1; Concourse | Lobby | Customer Service, Shops, Vending machines, ATMs |
| L2; Platforms | Southbound | ← Line 4 toward Minam (Suan) |
| L2; Platforms | Island platform, doors open on the left |
| L2; Platforms | Northbound | Line 4 toward Anpyeong (Chungnyeolsa) → |

== Gallery ==
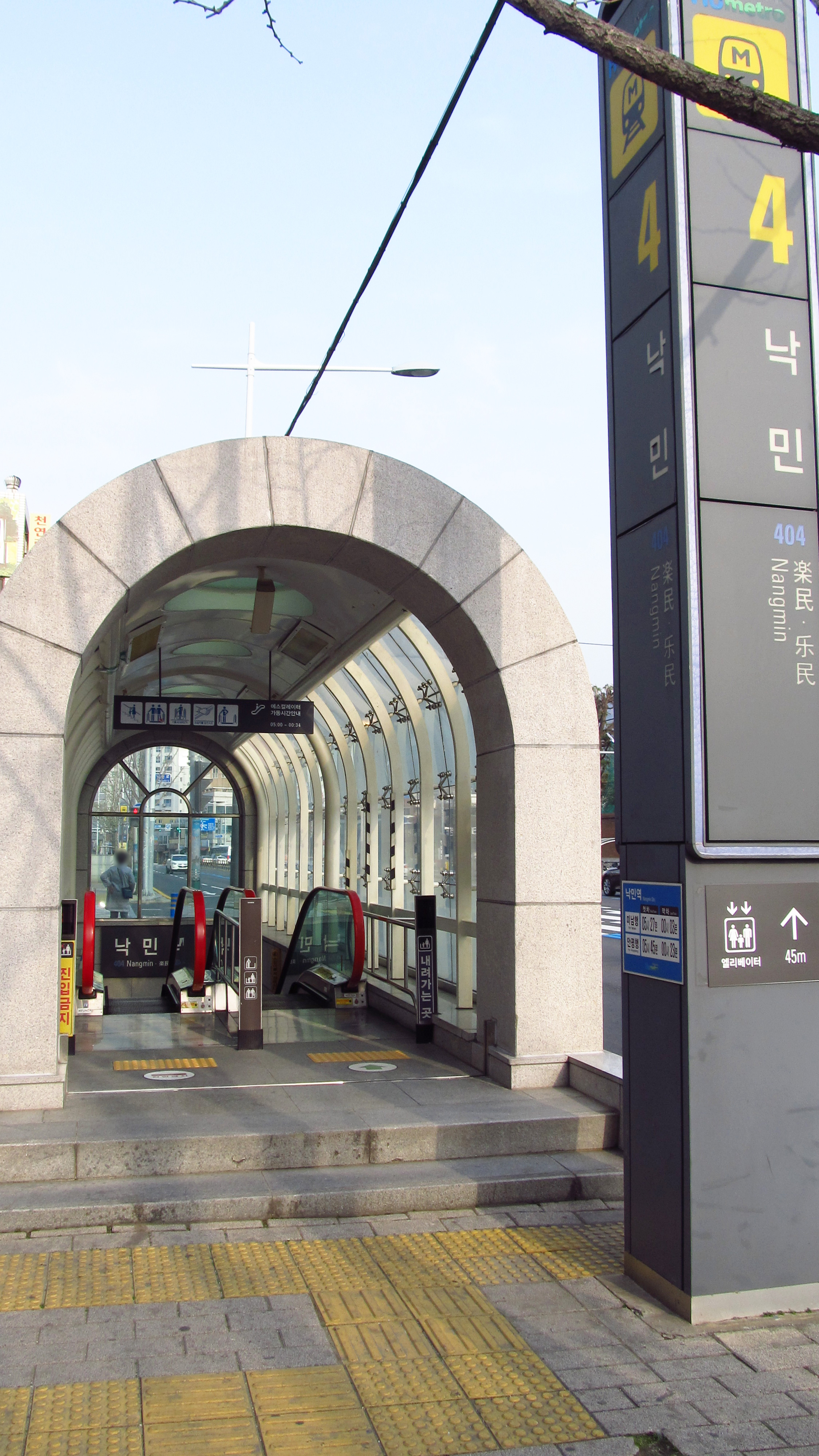
Nangmin station entrance No. 4

== Vicinity ==
- Exit 1: Dongnae High School
- Exit 2:
- Exit 3: Dongnae High School
- Exit 4:
