= List of cities in South Korea =

Special city (특별시; teukbyeolsi) Special autonomous city (특별자치시; teukbyeoljachisi) Metropolitan cities (광역시; gwangyeoksi) Big municipal cities (대도시; daedosi) Administrative cities (행정시; haengjeongsi) Cities (시; si)

The largest cities of South Korea have an autonomous status equivalent to that of provinces. Seoul, the largest city and capital, is classified as a teukbyeolsi (special city), while the next six-largest cities are classified as gwangyeoksi (metropolitan cities). Smaller cities are classified as si ("cities") and are under provincial jurisdiction, at the same level as counties.

== City status ==
Article 10 of the Local Autonomy Act defines the standards under which a populated area may become a city: an area which is predominantly urbanised and has a population of at least 50,000; a gun which has an urbanised area with a population of at least 50,000; or a gun which has a total population of at least 150,000 and multiple urbanised areas each with a population of at least 20,000. Cases outside of these standards require specific legislation, such as the special bill by the National Assembly to designate Gyeryong as a city.

Under Article 3 of the Local Autonomy Act, a city with a population of less than 500,000 may create administrative subdivisions in the form of dong in its urbanised area and eup or myeon in its rural area, while a city with a population of more than 500,000 may create administrative subdivisions in the form of non-autonomous gu.

== Classifications for large municipal cities ==
The national government can designate cities of at least 500,000 inhabitants as special status cities. This status expands the scope of administrative authority delegated from the provincial government to the city government. There is no legal standard for becoming a metropolitan city, but a city was usually promoted to a metropolitan city when the population was close to 1,000,000. However, there are four cities (Suwon, Changwon, Goyang, and Yongin) that have a population of more than one million but have not become metropolitan cities.

=== Big city ===
A big city is a city (other than a special city or a metropolitan city) that has a population greater than 500,000, and has been designated by an order of the national government under Article 198 of the Local Autonomy Act. Big municipal cities are given the power to subdivide themselves into non-autonomous districts (Korean: 일반구; Hanja: 一般區). However, some big municipal cities have chosen not to divide themselves into districts, such as Bucheon, Gimhae, Hwaseong, or Namyangju. Currently, South Korea has a total of 17 big cities. "Specific city" (특정시; 特定市) is an unofficial term for big city with municipal status.

Due its legal status as an administrative city, Jeju City cannot be designated as a "big city" under the Local Autonomy Law, despite having an estimated population exceeding 500,000 as of 2022. The designation of "administrative city" was created by the law which granted special self-governing status to Jeju Province; that law specifically states that the Local Autonomy Act would not apply to administrative cities. As such, Jeju City does not enjoy special autonomy and only has the same legal powers as the much smaller Seogwipo. The administrative authority of Jeju City is trying to expand the scope of administrative authority delegated from the provincial government to the city government.

=== Special-status city ===
A special-status city is a subclass of big municipal city that has a population greater than 1,500,000.

== List ==
Notes

- Seoul was designated a "Special Independent City" (특별자유시; 特別自由市; teukbyeoljayusi) separate from Gyeonggi Province on 16 August 1946; it became a "Special City" on August 15, 1949.
- Gwangju Metropolitan City was abolished on 1 July 2026 upon the establishment of Jeonnam-Gwangju Special Metropolitan City, which is officially abbreviated as "Gwangju Special City".

Name	Korean		No.
Name	Hangul	Hanja	No.
Special City	특별시	特別市	1
Special Self-Governing City	특별자치시	特別自治市	1
Metropolitan City	광역시	廣域市	6
Big Municipal city	대도시	大都市	17
Administrative City	행정시	行政市	2
City	시	市	60

rank	City	Hangul	Hanja	Province	Population (2017)	Area	Density	Founded
1	Andong	안동시	安東市	North Gyeongsang	168,226	1521.26	110.6	1963-01-01
2	Ansan	안산시	安山市	Gyeonggi	689,326	149.06	4624.5	1986-01-01
3	Anseong	안성시	安城市	Gyeonggi	182,784	553.47	330.3	1998-04-01
4	Anyang	안양시	安養市	Gyeonggi	598,392	58.46	10235.9	1973-07-01
5	Asan	아산시	牙山市	South Chungcheong	303,043	542.15	559.0	1986-01-01
6	Boryeong	보령시	保寧市	South Chungcheong	103,620	569.01	182.1	1986-01-01
7	Bucheon	부천시	富川市	Gyeonggi	851,245	53.40	15940.9	1973-07-01
8	Busan	부산광역시	釜山廣域市	none	3,496,779	765.94	4565.3	1963-01-01
9	Changwon	창원시	昌原市	South Gyeongsang	1,063,116	736.34	1443.8	1980-04-01
10	Cheonan	천안시	天安市	South Chungcheong	619,286	636.22	973.4	1963-01-01
11	Cheongju	청주시	淸州市	North Chungcheong	835,802	153.45	5446.7	1949-08-15
12	Chuncheon	춘천시	春川市	Gangwon	280,565	1116.35	251.3	1949-08-15
13	Chungju	충주시	忠州市	North Chungcheong	208,288	983.70	211.7	1956-07-08
14	Daegu	대구광역시	大邱廣域市	none	2,484,688	885.60	2805.7	1981-07-01
15	Daejeon	대전광역시	大田廣域市	none	1,514,354	539.86	2805.1	1989-01-01
16	Dangjin	당진시	唐津市	South Chungcheong	166,782	694.08	240.3	2012-01-01
17	Dongducheon	동두천시	東豆川市	Gyeonggi	98,062	95.66	1025.1	1981-07-01
18	Donghae	동해시	東海市	Gangwon	93,289	180.17	517.8	1980-04-01
19	Gangneung	강릉시	江陵市	Gangwon	213,747	1040.07	205.5	1955-09-01
20	Geoje	거제시	巨濟市	South Gyeongsang	256,979	401.61	639.9	1989-01-01
21	Gimcheon	김천시	金泉市	North Gyeongsang	142,277	1009.50	140.9	1949-08-14
22	Gimhae	김해시	金海市	South Gyeongsang	529,577	463.28	1143.1	1981-07-01
23	Gimje	김제시	金堤市	North Jeolla	87,658	544.99	160.8	1989-01-01
24	Gimpo	김포시	金浦市	Gyeonggi	364,808	276.64	1318.7	1998-04-01
25	Gongju	공주시	公州市	South Chungcheong	109,750	940.36	116.7	1986-01-01
26	Goyang	고양시	高陽市	Gyeonggi	1,040,648	267.31	3893.0	1992-02-01
27	Gumi	구미시	龜尾市	North Gyeongsang	420,048	615.52	682.4	1978-02-15
28	Gunpo	군포시	軍浦市	Gyeonggi	284,735	36.36	7831.0	1989-01-01
29	Gunsan	군산시	群山市	North Jeolla	277,328	675.38	410.6	1949-08-15
30	Guri	구리시	九里市	Gyeonggi	194,298	33.30	5834.8	1986-01-01
31	Gwacheon	과천시	果川市	Gyeonggi	62,929	35.86	1754.9	1986-01-01
32	Jeonnam–Gwangju (Gwangju)	전남광주 (광주)	全南光州 (光州)	none	1,469,583	501.26	2931.8	1986-11-01
33	Gwangju	광주시	廣州市	Gyeonggi	328,940	430.96	763.3	2001-03-21
34	Gwangmyeong	광명시	光明市	Gyeonggi	339,071	38.50	8807.0	1981-07-01
35	Gwangyang	광양시	光陽市	South Jeolla	154,164	453.84	339.7	1989-01-01
36	Gyeongju	경주시	慶州市	North Gyeongsang	259,228	1324.39	195.7	1955-09-01
37	Gyeongsan	경산시	慶山市	North Gyeongsang	257,902	411.70	626.4	1989-01-01
38	Gyeryong	계룡시	鷄龍市	South Chungcheong	42,737	60.74	703.6	2003-09-19
39	Hanam	하남시	河南市	Gyeonggi	213,028	93.07	2288.9	1989-01-01
40	Hwaseong	화성시	華城市	Gyeonggi	644,498	687.54	937.4	2001-03-21
41	Icheon	이천시	利川市	Gyeonggi	210,565	531.09	396.5	1996-03-01
42	Iksan	익산시	益山市	North Jeolla	301,061	506.70	594.2	1949-08-15
43	Incheon	인천광역시	仁川廣域市	none	2,944,009	1032.41	2851.6	1981-07-01
44	Jecheon	제천시	堤川市	North Chungcheong	136,389	883.09	154.4	1980-04-01
45	Jeongeup	정읍시	井邑市	North Jeolla	115,083	692.93	166.1	1981-07-01
46	Jeonju	전주시	全州市	North Jeolla	652,234	206.22	3162.8	1949-08-15
47	Jeju	제주시	濟州市	Jeju	470,957	977.80	481.6	1955-09-01
48	Jinju	진주시	晋州市	South Gyeongsang	347,056	712.62	487.0	1949-08-15
49	Naju	나주시	羅州市	South Jeolla	105,080	172.8	608.15	1981-07-01
50	Namyangju	남양주시	南楊州市	Gyeonggi	662,183	458.54	1444.1	1989-01-01
51	Namwon	남원시	南原市	North Jeolla	84,140	752.50	111.8	1981-07-01
52	Nonsan	논산시	論山市	South Chungcheong	123,094	554.85	221.9	1996-03-01
53	Miryang	밀양시	密陽市	South Gyeongsang	108,322	799.01	135.6	1989-01-01
54	Mokpo	목포시	木浦市	South Jeolla	237,464	50.08	4741.7	1949-08-15
55	Mungyeong	문경시	聞慶市	North Gyeongsang	74,555	911.17	81.8	1986-01-01
56	Osan	오산시	烏山市	Gyeonggi	208,873	42.76	4884.8	1989-01-01
57	Paju	파주시	坡州市	Gyeonggi	431,035	672.57	640.9	1996-03-01
58	Pocheon	포천시	抱川市	Gyeonggi	154,381	826.50	186.8	2003-10-19
59	Pohang	포항시	浦項市	North Gyeongsang	516,497	1128.76	457.6	1949-08-14
60	Pyeongtaek	평택시	平澤市	Gyeonggi	472,141	454.62	1038.5	1986-01-01
61	Sacheon	사천시	泗川市	South Gyeongsang	114,854	398.25	288.4	1956-07-08
62	Sangju	상주시	尙州市	North Gyeongsang	101,729	1254.83	81.1	1986-01-01
63	Samcheok	삼척시	三陟市	Gangwon	70,120	1185.86	59.1	1986-01-01
64	Sejong	세종특별자치시	世宗特別自治市	none	244,939	465.23	526.5	2012-07-01
65	Seogwipo	서귀포시	西歸浦市	Jeju	171,431	870.87	196.9	1981-07-01
66	Seongnam	성남시	城南市	Gyeonggi	974,755	141.82	6873.2	1973-07-01
67	Seosan	서산시	瑞山市	South Chungcheong	170,810	740.66	230.6	1989-01-01
68	Seoul	서울특별시	서울特別市	none	9,930,478	605.27	16406.7	1946-08-16
69	Siheung	시흥시	始興市	Gyeonggi	403,398	135.02	2987.7	1989-01-01
70	Sokcho	속초시	束草市	Gangwon	81,797	105.00	779.0	1963-01-01
71	Suncheon	순천시	順天市	South Jeolla	279,540	907.41	308.1	1949-08-14
72	Suwon	수원시	水原市	Gyeonggi	1,194,276	121.09	9862.7	1949-08-14
73	Taebaek	태백시	太白市	Gangwon	46,892	303.57	154.5	1981-07-01
74	Tongyeong	통영시	統營市	South Gyeongsang	138,001	238.85	577.8	1955-09-01
75	Uijeongbu	의정부시	議政府市	Gyeonggi	438,753	81.59	5377.5	1963-01-01
76	Uiwang	의왕시	義王市	Gyeonggi	156,410	54.00	2896.5	1989-01-01
77	Ulsan	울산광역시	蔚山廣域市	none	1,117,656	1057.50	1056.9	1997-07-15
78	Wonju	원주시	原州市	Gangwon	338,374	872.56	387.8	1955-09-01
79	Yangju	양주시	楊州市	Gyeonggi	205,977	309.77	664.9	2003-10-19
80	Yangsan	양산시	梁山市	South Gyeongsang	318,836	485.18	657.1	1996-03-01
81	Yeoju	여주시	驪州市	Gyeonggi	111,558	608.64	183.3	2013-09-23
82	Yeongcheon	영천시	永川市	North Gyeongsang	100,384	920.29	109.1	1981-07-01
83	Yeongju	영주시	榮州市	North Gyeongsang	109,281	669.05	163.3	1980-04-01
84	Yeosu	여수시	麗水市	South Jeolla	288,818	501.27	576.2	1949-08-14
85	Yongin	용인시	龍仁市	Gyeonggi	991,622	591.36	1676.8	1996-03-01

== Cities by population ==
This is a list cities of South Korea by population including provincial-level divisions: special city (특별시/特別市) and metropolitan cities (광역시/廣域市), and municipal-level division: cities (시/市). Other municipal-level divisions: counties (군/郡 which have populations under 50K) and districts (구/區) are not included. All population data are based on the South Korean population and housing census 2000–2020.

Rank	Division		2020	2015	2010	2005	2000
1	Seoul	(Special city)	9,586,195	9,904,312	9,631,482	9,762,546	9,853,972
2	Busan	(Metropolitan city)	3,349,016	3,448,737	3,393,191	3,512,547	3,655,437
3	Incheon	(Metropolitan city)	2,945,454	2,890,451	2,632,035	2,517,680	2,466,338
4	Daegu	(Metropolitan city)	2,410,700	2,466,052	2,431,774	2,456,016	2,473,990
5	Daejeon	(Metropolitan city)	1,488,435	1,538,394	1,490,158	1,438,551	1,365,961
6	Gwangju	(Metropolitan city)	1,477,573	1,502,881	1,466,143	1,413,644	1,350,948
7	Suwon	Gyeonggi	1,210,150	1,194,313	1,054,053	1,039,233	944,239
8	Ulsan	(Metropolitan city)	1,135,423	1,166,615	1,071,673	1,044,934	1,012,110
9	Yongin	Gyeonggi	1,066,975	971,327	847,138	686,842	384,741
10	Goyang	Gyeonggi	1,045,497	990,073	897,222	864,402	762,598
11	Changwon	South Gyeongsang	1,029,389	1,059,241	1,047,488	1,075,326	1,076,448
12	Seongnam	Gyeonggi	922,025	948,757	936,267	931,019	912,222
13	Hwaseong	Gyeonggi	880,859	608,725	474,160	282,124	185,979
14	Cheongju	North Chungcheong	855,326	833,276	804,119	752,768	701,256
15	Bucheon	Gyeonggi	833,148	843,794	842,482	833,931	757,832
16	Ansan	Gyeonggi	717,345	747,035	699,063	669,839	554,998
17	Namyangju	Gyeonggi	696,033	629,061	526,639	424,446	339,545
18	Cheonan	South Chungcheong	682,199	629,062	565,201	518,171	415,818
19	Jeonju	North Jeolla	666,517	658,172	646,512	622,092	615,804
20	Gimhae	South Gyeongsang	552,427	534,124	484,244	428,893	330,829
21	Pyeongtaek	Gyeonggi	542,522	457,873	381,731	374,262	342,806
22	Anyang	Gyeonggi	542,336	585,177	596,772	609,886	578,845
23	Siheung	Gyeonggi	535,147	425,184	393,293	384,304	304,260
24	Pohang	North Gyeongsang	501,109	511,804	508,736	488,433	515,187
25	Jeju (City)	Jeju (Prov.)	492,306	451,758	398,677	391,132	366,809
26	Uijeongbu	Gyeonggi	449,572	421,579	415,170	397,694	354,422
27	Gimpo	Gyeonggi	474,546	352,683	217,280	192,716	148,576
28	Paju	Gyeonggi	460,541	415,345	323,955	239,823	177,128
29	Gumi	North Gyeongsang	416,603	421,075	399,019	381,583	339,457
30	Gwangju	Gyeonggi	385,141	310,278	224,269	204,266	124,789
31	Sejong	(Special autonomous city)	353,933	204,088	80,542	80,389	79,745
32	Wonju	Gangwon	352,429	330,854	309,803	283,583	267,849
33	Jinju	South Gyeongsang	352,403	349,788	335,297	336,355	339,413
34	Yangsan	South Gyeongsang	351,206	297,532	249,529	215,845	191,147
35	Asan	South Chungcheong	340,518	319,929	272,282	206,851	179,900
36	Gwangmyeong	Gyeonggi	298,116	338,509	326,418	319,452	333,596
37	Iksan	North Jeolla	285,312	301,723	294,479	306,974	322,636
38	Chuncheon	Gangwon	284,645	281,596	274,220	260,234	252,177
39	Gyeongsan	North Gyeongsang	283,733	278,500	260,643	240,371	226,713
40	Hanam	Gyeonggi	279,795	154,838	137,569	121,646	120,149
41	Gunpo	Gyeonggi	275,571	285,721	274,198	268,917	262,593
42	Suncheon	South Jeolla	272,449	265,390	257,800	261,519	265,724
43	Yeosu	South Jeolla	271,505	273,761	268,727	277,420	303,115
44	Gunsan	North Jeolla	269,023	275,155	258,845	249,212	272,129
45	Gyeongju	North Gyeongsang	261,778	262,310	252,750	266,131	275,132
46	Geoje	South Gyeongsang	246,965	261,371	225,014	193,398	167,231
47	Osan	Gyeonggi	240,645	213,840	180,996	131,792	102,287
48	Yangju	Gyeonggi	233,286	205,988	183,673	149,931	107,440
49	Icheon	Gyeonggi	226,212	209,003	192,918	187,514	179,081
50	Mokpo	South Jeolla	224,509	239,524	248,694	244,543	250,336
51	Chungju	North Chungcheong	218,412	211,005	201,361	204,248	217,510
52	Gangneung	Gangwon	216,542	215,677	217,481	220,706	227,856
53	Anseong	Gyeonggi	203,030	194,765	175,824	157,632	132,906
54	Guri	Gyeonggi	192,051	180,063	184,503	186,954	160,485
55	Seogwipo	Jeju (Prov.)	178,552	153,861	129,734	139,554	145,732
56	Seosan	South Chungcheong	176,379	169,221	155,082	143,692	142,972
57	Dangjin	South Chungcheong	168,955	163,762	135,106	112,267	117,447
58	Uiwang	Gyeonggi	160,230	154,879	143,378	143,568	117,594
59	Andong	North Gyeongsang	159,412	168,581	165,399	169,436	181,974
60	Pocheon	Gyeonggi	157,939	163,388	136,580	139,472	135,758
61	Gwangyang	South Jeolla	143,928	144,414	137,100	135,583	132,568
62	Gimcheon	North Gyeongsang	139,145	137,540	126,823	135,166	147,269
63	Jecheon	North Chungcheong	134,768	136,350	133,626	132,483	143,537
64	Tongyeong	South Gyeongsang	127,984	137,208	127,896	121,115	123,747
65	Nonsan	South Chungcheong	119,707	124,246	117,686	124,779	137,452
66	Yeoju	Gyeonggi	113,352	109,937	100,052	98,441	97,412
67	Naju	South Jeolla	113,293	92,582	77,825	86,823	99,233
68	Sacheon	South Gyeongsang	111,184	113,335	106,175	106,532	110,912
69	Gongju	South Chungcheong	108,333	113,542	120,660	126,484	130,223
70	Jeongeup	North Jeolla	106,706	110,627	109,458	115,416	128,892
71	Yeongju	North Gyeongsang	103,818	109,266	108,268	113,670	126,415
72	Miryang	South Gyeongsang	103,228	103,069	98,564	105,651	115,787
73	Yeongcheon	North Gyeongsang	100,353	97,669	94,350	103,289	110,918
74	Boryeong	South Chungcheong	99,088	101,852	97,091	96,992	109,423
75	Sangju	North Gyeongsang	95,473	98,760	97,559	105,600	116,365
76	Dongducheon	Gyeonggi	95,239	97,424	90,433	78,897	72,366
77	Donghae	Gangwon	87,801	90,255	90,321	93,018	96,280
78	Sokcho	Gangwon	80,054	79,846	80,505	84,706	87,880
79	Gimje	North Jeolla	79,733	84,269	82,739	90,376	102,428
80	Namwon	North Jeolla	78,097	80,499	78,425	85,828	94,810
81	Mungyeong	North Gyeongsang	68,212	71,863	68,692	70,813	90,778
82	Samcheok	Gangwon	65,939	69,509	67,131	67,957	75,592
83	Gwacheon	Gyeonggi	58,018	64,817	66,319	56,587	66,592
84	Taebaek	Gangwon	41,494	46,715	51,400	55,241	54,164
85	Gyeryong	South Chungcheong	40,854	39,243	41,395	31,646	27,104

== Renamed cities ==
Before	Hangul	Hanja	After	Hangul	Hanja	Renamed date
Chungmu	충무시	忠武市	Tongyeong	통영시	統營市	1995-01-01
Daecheon	대천시	大川市	Boryeong	보령시	保寧市	1995-01-01
Donggwangyang	동광양시	東光陽市	Gwangyang	광양시	光陽市	1995-01-01
Geumseong	금성시	錦城市	Naju	나주시	羅州市	1986-01-01
Gyeongseong	경성부	京城府	Seoul	서울특별시	서울特別市	1949-08-15
Iri	이리시	裡里市	Iksan	익산시	益山市	1995-05-10
Jangseungpo	장승포시	長承浦市	Geoje	거제시	巨濟市	1995-01-01
Jeomchon	점촌시	店村市	Mungyeong	문경시	聞慶市	1995-01-01
Jeongju	정주시	井州市	Jeongeup	정읍시	井邑市	1995-01-01
Migeum	미금시	渼金市	Namyangju	남양주시	南楊州市	1995-01-01
Onyang	온양시	溫陽市	Asan	아산시	牙山市	1995-01-01
Samcheonpo	삼천포시	三千浦市	Sacheon	사천시	泗川市	1995-05-10

== Dissolved cities ==
City	Hangul	Hanja	Founded	Dissolved	Merged division
Busan	부산부	釜山府	1914-03-01	1949-08-15	upgraded into a city (시; 市)
Busan	부산시	釜山市	1949-08-15	1963-01-01	upgraded into a Directly administered city and changed into a Metropolitan city in 1995-01-01
Cheongju	청주부	淸州府	1946-06-01	1949-08-15	upgraded into a city (시; 市)
Chuncheon	춘천부	春川府	1946-06-01	1949-08-15	upgraded into a city (시; 市)
Daegu	대구부	大邱府	1914-03-01	1949-08-15	upgraded into a city (시; 市)
Daegu	대구시	大邱市	1949-08-15	1981-07-01	upgraded into a Directly administered city and changed into a Metropolitan city in 1995-01-01
Daejeon	대전부	大田府	1935-10-01	1949-08-15	upgraded into a city (시; 市)
Daejeon	대전시	大田市	1949-08-15	1989-01-01	upgraded into a Directly administered city and changed into a Metropolitan city in 1995-01-01
Gunsan	군산부	群山府	1914-03-01	1949-08-15	upgraded into a city (시; 市)
Gwangju	광주부	光州府	1935-10-01	1949-08-15	upgraded into a city (시; 市)
Gwangju	광주시	光州市	1949-08-15	1986-11-01	upgraded into a Directly administered city and changed into a Metropolitan city in 1995-01-01
Keijō	경성부	京城府	1914-03-01	1946-08-16	upgraded into a Special independent city and changed into a Special city in 1949-08-15
Incheon	인천부	仁川府	1914-03-01	1949-08-15	upgraded into a city (시; 市)
Incheon	인천시	仁川市	1949-08-15	1981-07-01	upgraded into a Directly administered city and changed into a Metropolitan city in 1995-01-01
Iri	이리부	裡里府	1947-02-23	1949-08-15	upgraded into a city (시; 市)
Jeonju	전주부	全州府	1935-10-01	1949-08-15	upgraded into a city (시; 市)
Jinhae	진해시	鎭海市	1955-09-01	2010-07-01	merged into Changwon
Jinju	진주부	晋州府	1939-10-01	1949-08-15	upgraded into a city (시; 市)
Masan	마산부	馬山府	1914-03-01	1949-08-15	upgraded into a city (시; 市)
Masan	마산시	馬山市	1949-08-15	2010-07-01	merged into Changwon
Mokpo	목포부	木浦府	1914-03-01	1949-08-15	upgraded into a city (시; 市)
Songjeong	송정시	松汀市	1986-11-01	1988-01-01	merged into Gwangju
Songtan	송탄시	松炭市	1981-07-01	1995-05-10	merged into Pyeongtaek
Ulsan	울산시	蔚山市	1962-06-01	1997-07-15	upgraded into a Metropolitan city
Yeocheon	여천시	麗川市	1986-01-01	1998-04-01	merged into Yeosu

== Claimed cities ==
City	Hangul	Hanja	Province	Founded
Cheongjin	청진시	淸津市	North Hamgyeong	1949-05-23
Gaeseong	개성시	開城市	Gyeonggi*	1949-05-23
Haeju	해주시	海州市	Hwanghae	1949-05-23
Hamheung	함흥시	咸興市	South Hamgyeong	1949-05-23
Heungnam	흥남시	興南市	South Hamgyeong	1949-05-23
Jinnampo	진남포시	鎭南浦市	South Pyeongan	1949-05-23
Najin	나진시	羅津市	North Hamgyeong	1949-05-23
Pyeongyang	평양시	平壤市	South Pyeongan	1949-05-23
Sariwon	사리원시	沙里院市	Hwanghae	1949-05-23
Seongjin	성진시	城津市	North Hamgyeong	1949-05-23
Sinuiju	신의주시	新義州市	North Pyeongan	1949-05-23
Songnim	송림시	松林市	Hwanghae	1949-05-23
Wonsan	원산시	元山市	South Hamgyeong	1949-05-23

== Gallery ==
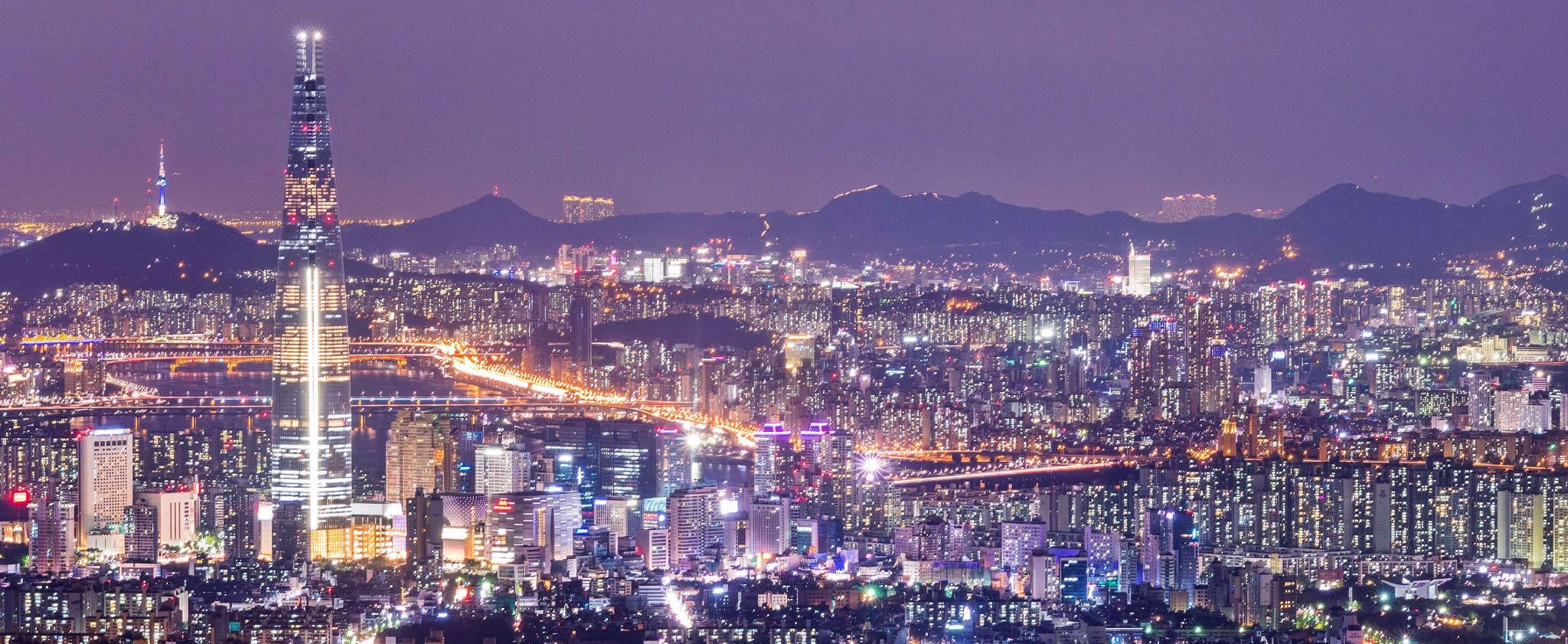
1 - Seoul

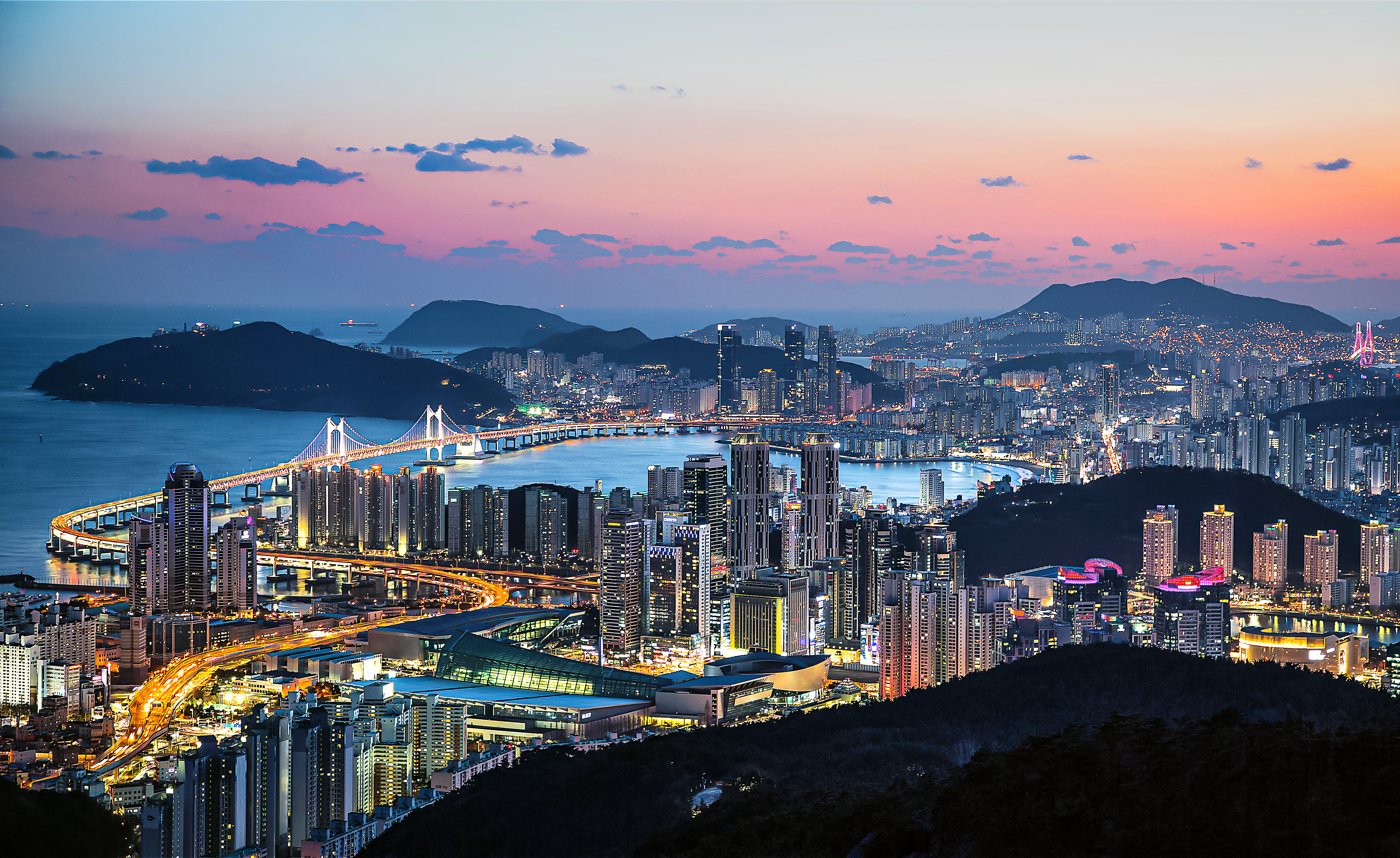
2 - Busan

3 - Incheon

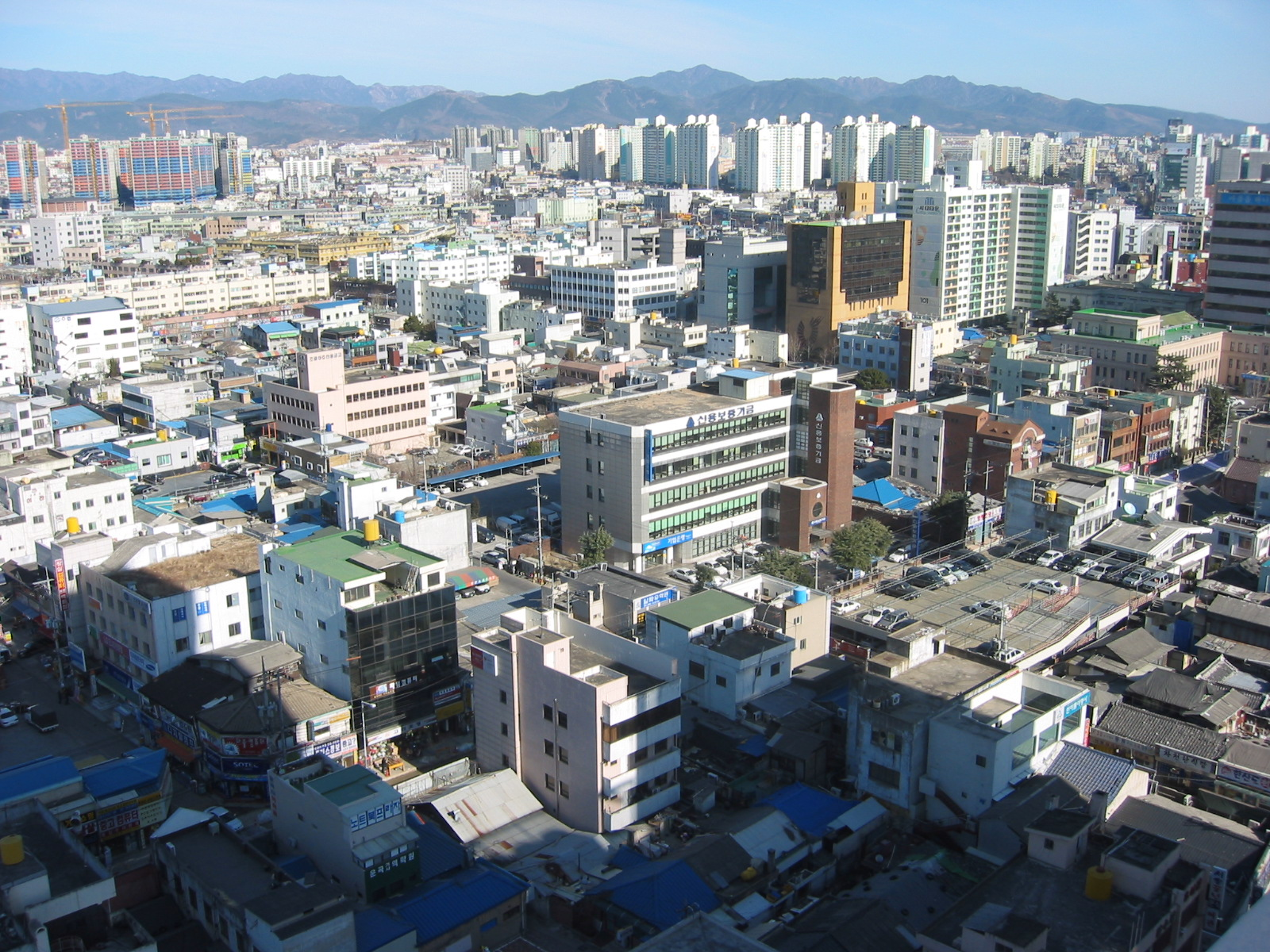
4 - Daegu

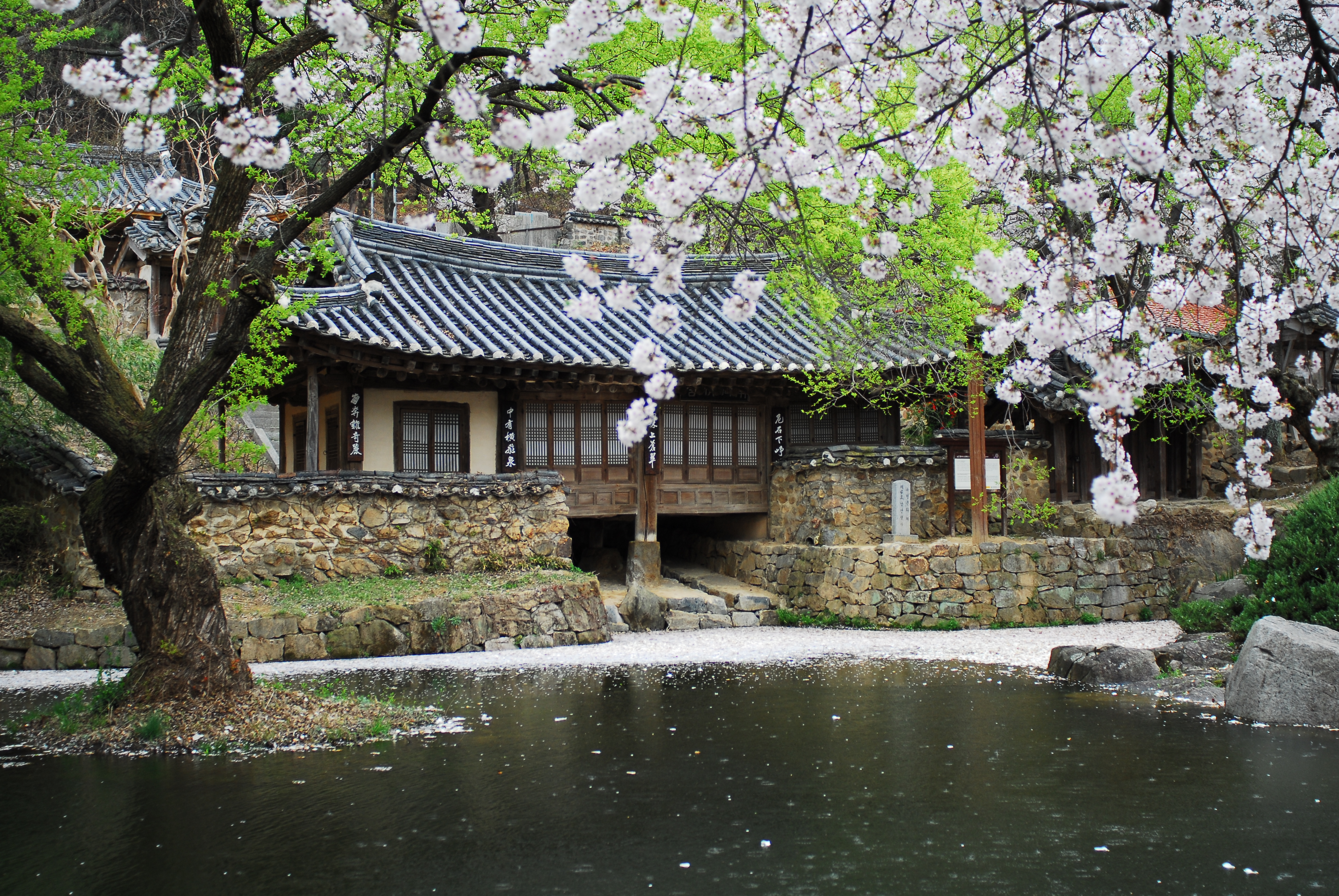
5 - Daejeon

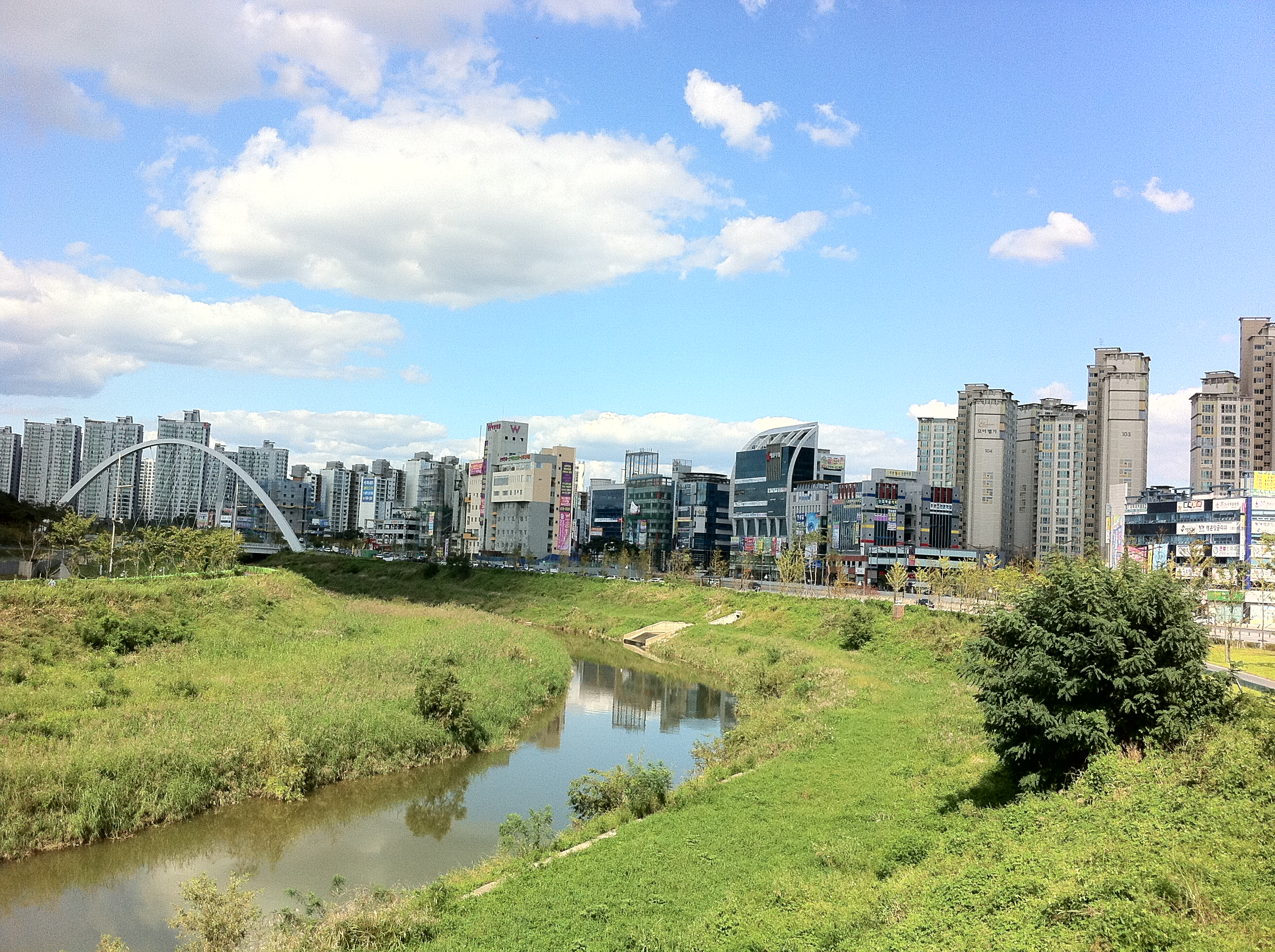
6 - Gwangju

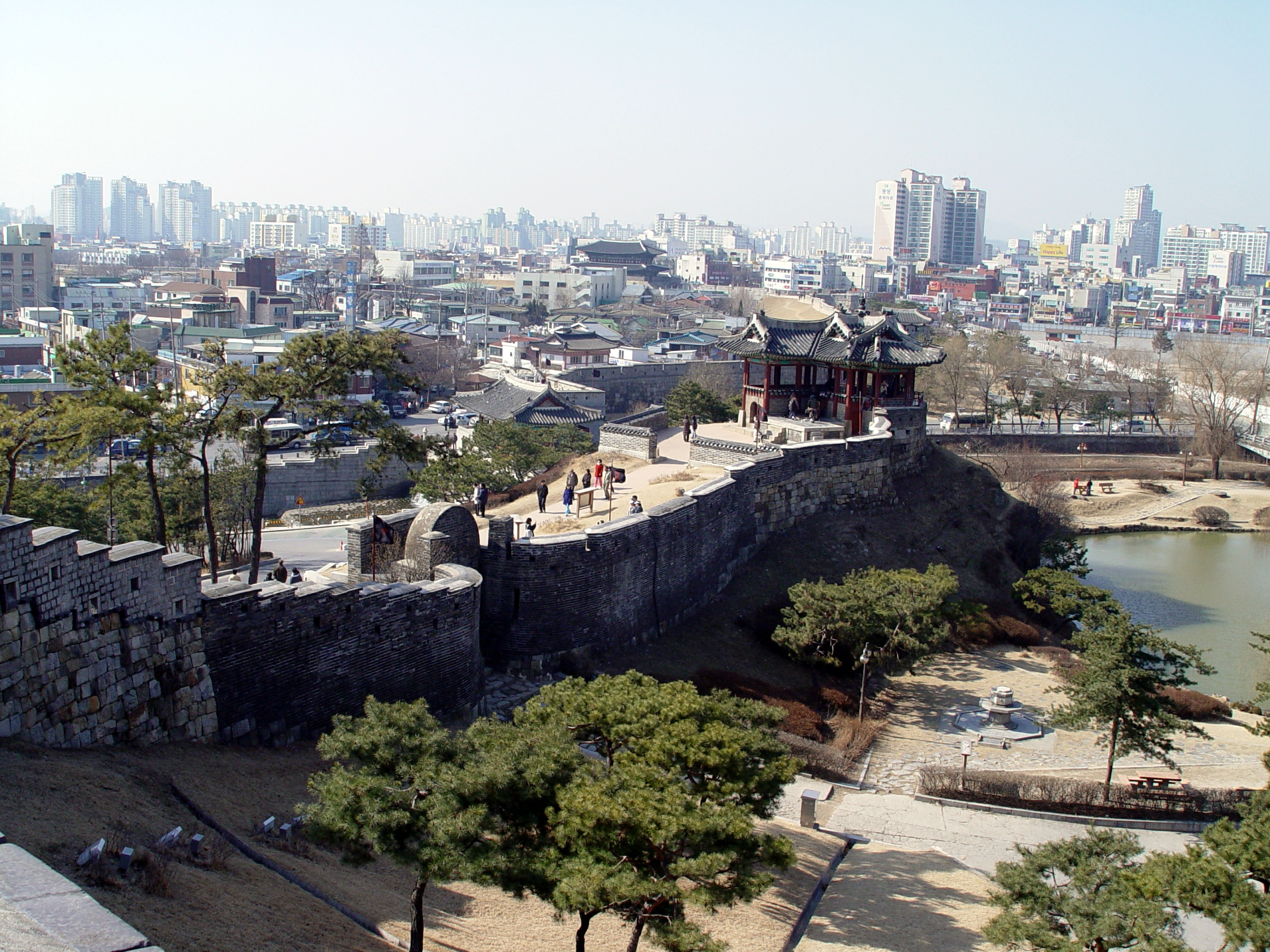
7 - Suwon

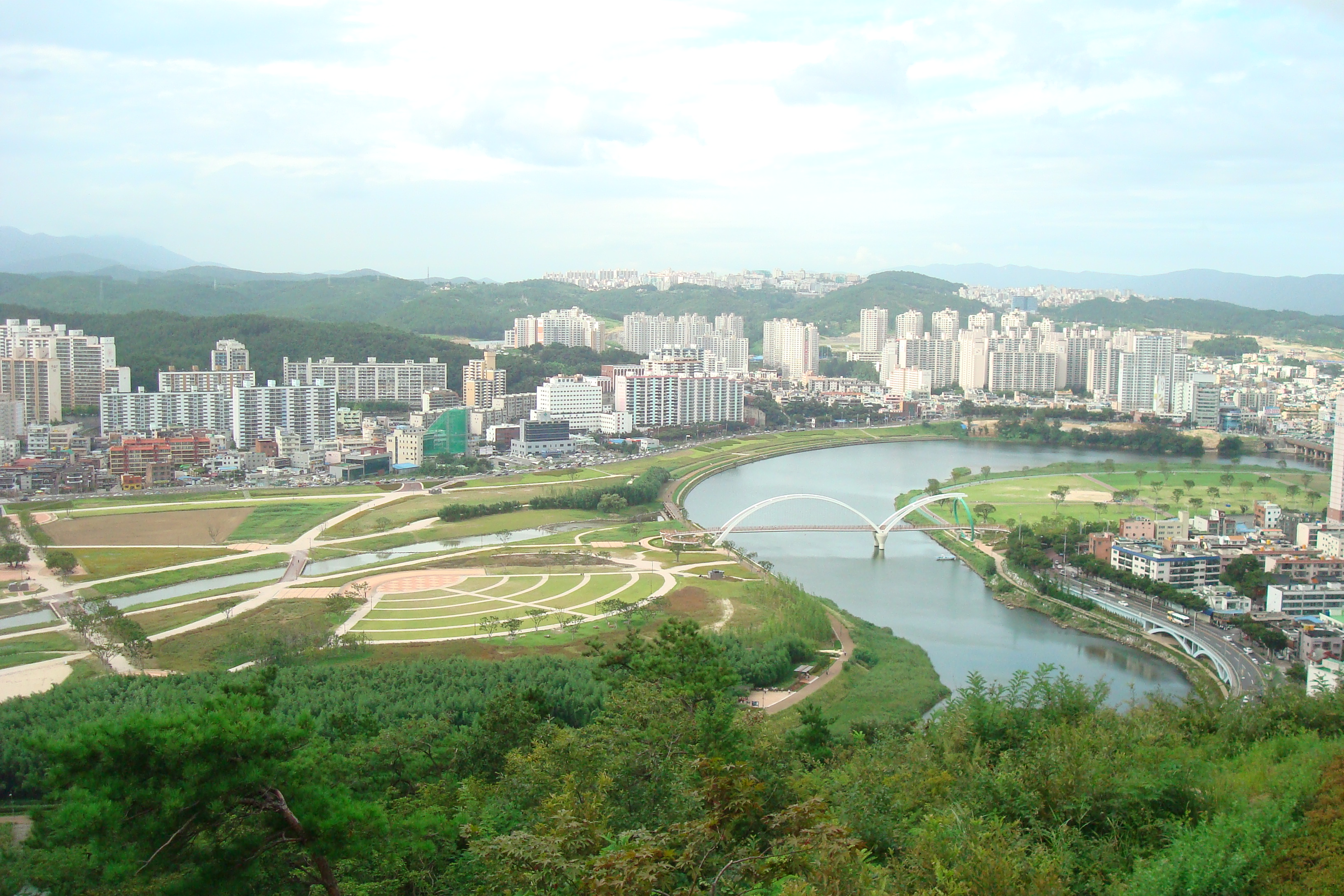
8 - Ulsan

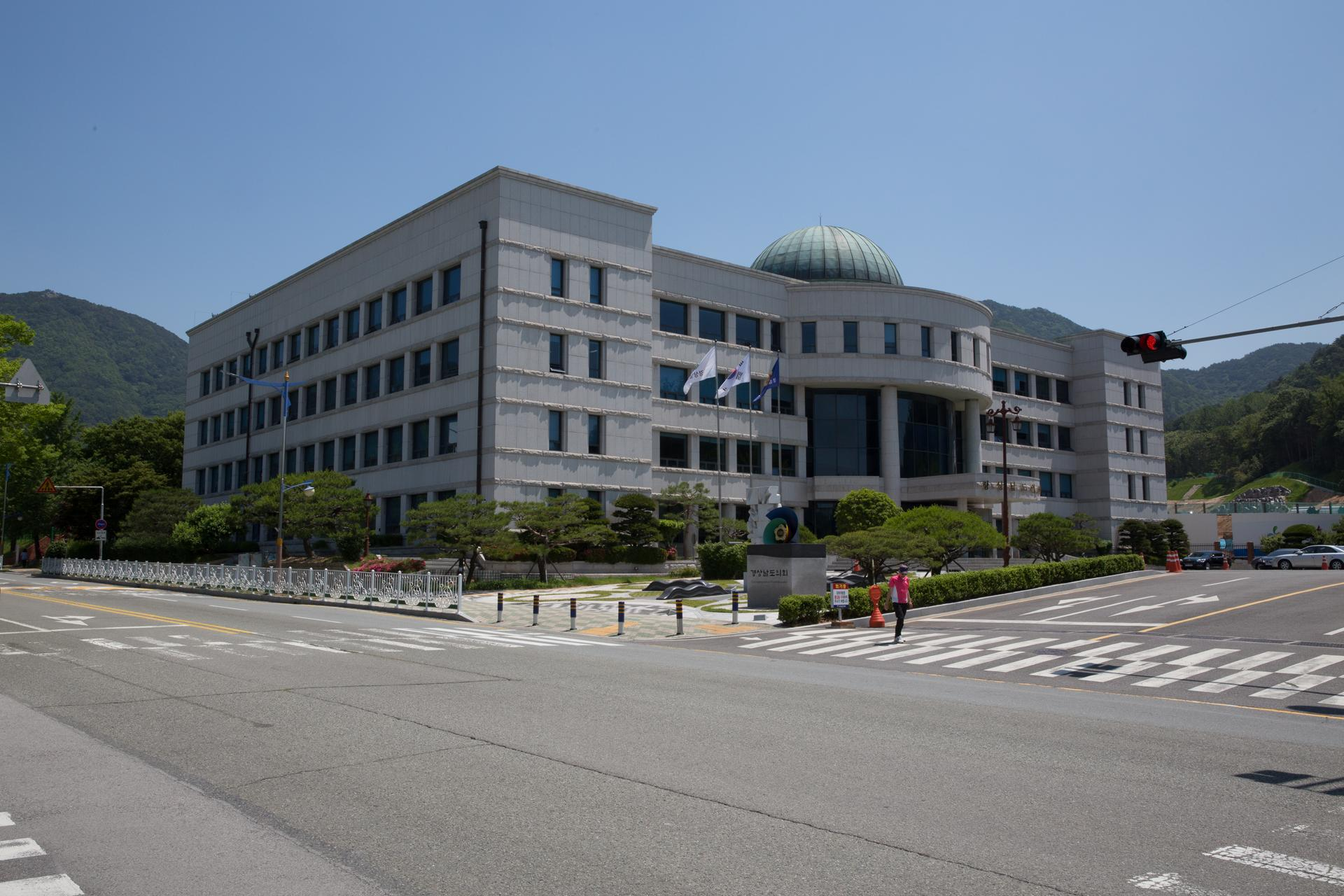
9 - Changwon

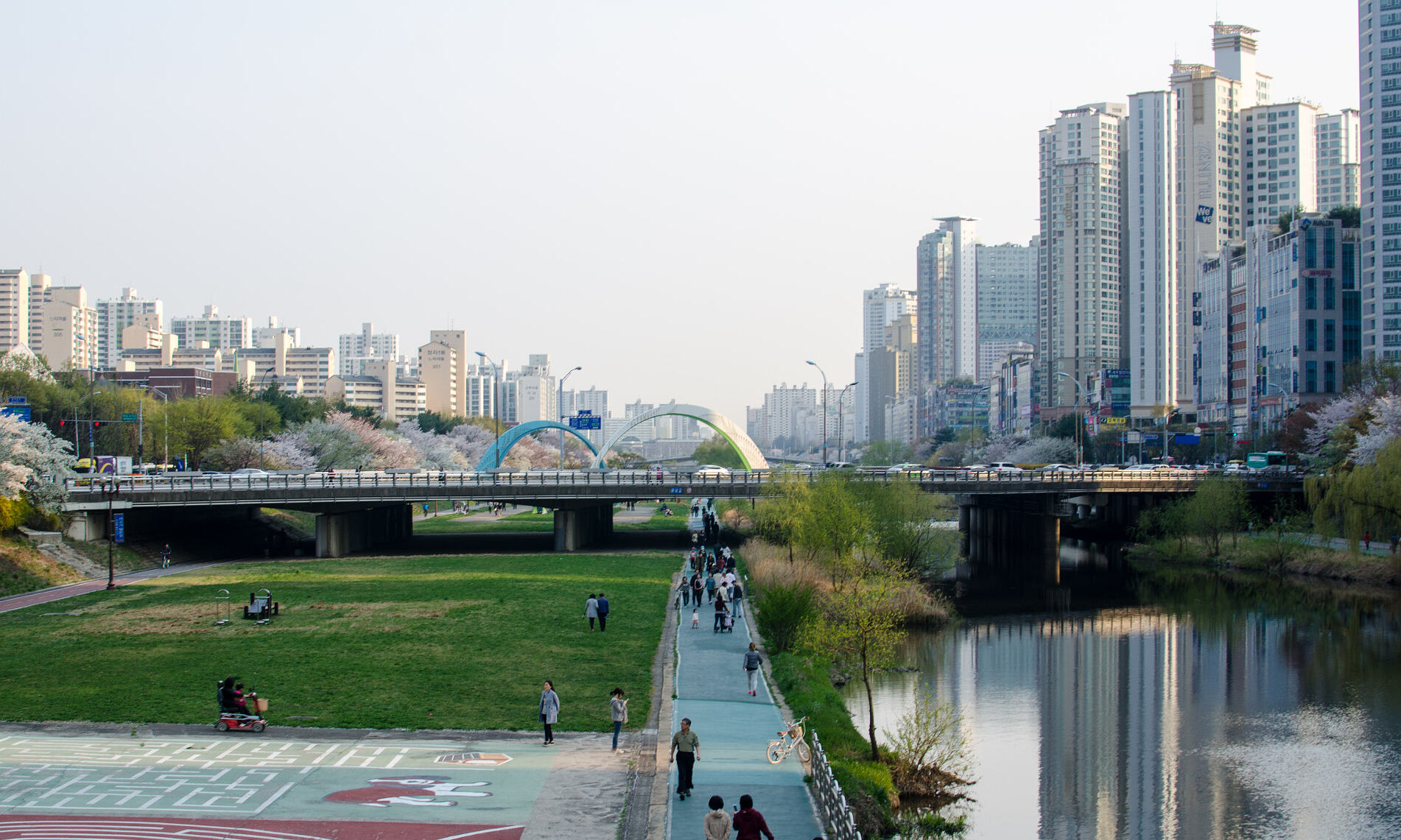
10 - Seongnam

== See also ==
- Administrative divisions of South Korea
- List of largest cities
- List of South Korean regions by GDP

== Sources ==
- The Principal Cities of South Korea
- Korea.net-Facts about Korea
- Korea.net-Facts about Korea
