= Park Yong-ok =

South Korean politician (born 1942)

- Hangul: 박용옥
- Hanja: 朴庸玉
- RR: Bak Yongok
- MR: Pak Yongok

Park Yong-ok (Korean: 박용옥, born September 15, 1942) is a South Korean politician. He held the position of Governor (도지사) of the hypothetical South Korean province of South Pyeongan (a territory under the control of North Korea) between 2009 and 2013.

Park has held the position of the 30th vice-minister of Defense.
