= Provincial-level cities of South Korea =

Special cities and metropolitan cities of South Korea

- Special metropolitan city
- Hangul: 특별시
- Hanja: 特別市
- RR: teukbyeolsi
- MR: t'ŭkpyŏlsi

Special metropolitan city
- Hangul: 통합특별시
- Hanja: 統合特別市
- RR: tonghapteukbyeolsi
- MR: t'onghapt'ŭkpyŏlsi

Metropolitan city
- Hangul: 광역시
- Hanja: 廣域市
- RR: gwangyeoksi
- MR: kwangyŏksi

Special self-governing city
- Hangul: 특별자치시
- Hanja: 特別自治市
- RR: teukbyeoljachisi
- MR: t'ŭkpyŏljach'isi

Special cites in South Korea

Province-level cities are one of the first-level administrative divisions within South Korea.

There are three types of province-level cities: special, metropolitan, and special self-governing. Currently, there are eight province-level cities: Busan, Daegu, Daejeon, Incheon, Jeonnam-Gwangju, Sejong, Seoul, and Ulsan.

== Position in hierarchy and types ==
Province-level cities have equal status to provinces in the South Korean administrative scheme, and are among the highest-ranked administrative divisions of South Korea. There are three kinds of first-level city in South Korea.

Type	Hangul	Hanja	RR	City names	No. of cities
Special Metropolitan City	특별시	特別市	teukbyeolsi	Seoul	1
Special Metropolitan City	통합특별시	統合特別市	tonghapteukbyeolsi	Jeonnam–Gwangju	1
Metropolitan City	광역시	廣域市	gwangyeoksi	Busan, Daegu, Incheon, Daejeon, Ulsan	5
Special Self-Governing City	특별자치시	特別自治市	teukbyeol-jachisi	Sejong	1

- Seoul was designated a "special free city" (teukbyeol jayusi; 특별자유시; 特別自由市) separate from Gyeonggi Province on August 15, 1946; it became a "special metropolitan city" on August 15, 1949.
- Metropolitan cities were called "direct control (meaning directly-administered) city" (jikhalsi; 직할시; 直轄市) before 1995.

== Administration ==
In South Korean special metropolitan city and metropolitan cities, the mayor is the highest-ranking official in charge. The mayor is directly elected by the people registered in the city for a duration of four years (e.g., the mayor of Seoul).

Metropolitan functions such as water supply and public transport are integrated into the sole prefecture other than scattered to each municipality.

== List of provincial-level cities ==
Name	Hangul	Hanja	Type	ISO	Population (2017)	Area (km^{2})	Density (/km^{2})	City seat	Region	Province split from	Year of Split
Busan	부산광역시	釜山廣域市	Metropolitan city	KR-26	3,416,918	769.89	4,438.18	Yeonje	Yeongnam	South Gyeongsang	1963
Daegu	대구광역시	大邱廣域市	Metropolitan city	KR-27	2,453,041	883.56	2,776.31	Jung	Yeongnam	North Gyeongsang	1981
Daejeon	대전광역시	大田廣域市	Metropolitan city	KR-30	1,525,849	539.35	2,829.05	Seo	Hoseo	South Chungcheong	1989
Incheon	인천광역시	仁川廣域市	Metropolitan city	KR-28	2,925,967	1,062.60	2,753.59	Namdong	Sudogwon	Gyeonggi	1981
Jeonnam-Gwangju	전남광주통합특별시	全南光州統合特別市	Special metropolitan city						Honam		
Sejong	세종특별자치시	世宗特別自治市	Special self-governing city	KR-50	356,278	465.23	594.52	Boram-dong	Hoseo	South Chungcheong	2012
Seoul	서울특별시	서울特別市*	Special metropolitan city	KR-11	9,741,381	605.21	16,095.86	Jung	Sudogwon	Gyeonggi	1946
Ulsan	울산광역시	蔚山廣域市	Metropolitan city	KR-31	1,157,077	1,060.79	1,090.76	Nam	Yeongnam	South Gyeongsang	1997

Notes: There are no Hanja for "Seoul"; in Chinese, it is written as 首爾/首尔 (pinyin: Shǒu'ěr), a transcription based on the pronunciation of "Seoul". As a suffix, the character Gyeong (경; 京) is used, which means "capital".

== See also ==
- Administrative divisions of South Korea
- Cities of South Korea
- List of cities in South Korea
- Provinces of South Korea
- Special cities of North Korea
- Independent city
  - Direct-administered municipality (Mainland China)
  - Special municipality (Taiwan)
  - Municipalities of Vietnam
- Federal city
  - Federal cities of Russia — similar systems
