= Dongnae Market =

Traditional market in Busan, South Korea

- Location: 14 Dongnaesijang-gil, Dongnae District, Busan, South Korea; 35.2038°N 129.0859°E
- Interactive map of Dongnae Market

Dongnae Market (Korean: 동래시장; Hanja: 東萊市場) is a historic traditional market in Dongnae District, Busan, South Korea. It has operated since the Joseon period.

The earliest known written attestation to the market is in the 1770 text Tonggungmunhŏnbigo. A wooden building was constructed for it in 1930. The market was moved again in June 1937, to its current location. A wooden building for it was destroyed in a fire on December 22, 1968. A reinforced concrete building was made for it on August 6, 1970. The market was seen as a major place of business in Busan until the 1990s, when a number of supermarkets and malls moved into the area. It waned in influence afterwards. It was renovated in 2002; air conditioning, heating, and a parking lot were installed for the market.

The market currently occupies a two-floor building. It has an area of 3,666 m^{2} (39,460 ft^{2}). It has 346 stores. The first floor sells various foods, including seafood, vegetables, and fruits. The second floor has restaurants and household goods. All merchants in the market are reportedly part of a market cooperative.
