= Tumuli in Bokcheon-dong, Dongnae =

Tumulus in Korea

- Hangul: 복천동 고분군
- Hanja: 福泉洞古墳群
- RR: Bokcheon-dong gobungun
- MR: Pokch'ŏn-dong kobun'gun

Tumuli in Bokcheon-dong, Dongnae is located in Dongnae-gu, Busan Metropolitan City, the Republic of Korea. A number of tombs are scattered about this hillside in Bokcheon-dong, which had been excavated partly by the Museum of Dong-A University. But later, through a new survey, the Museum of Pusan National University revealed many more tombs that were not visible from the ground. Some of the tombs are pit types without coffins, some have wooden coffins, and others have stone coffins covered with stone slabs. Many artifacts, including a bronze-gilded crown, an iron helmet, some armor, a horse bell and a horse face-guard were unearthed during the excavations. These are not only important to the study of the culture of Gaya Kingdoms (1st-6th centuries AD) but are also revealing about how that culture was transmitted to Japan.
