= Myeongjang-dong =

Neighborhood in Dongnae-gu, Busan, South Korea

- Hangul: 명장동
- Hanja: 鳴藏洞
- RR: Myeongjang-dong
- MR: Myŏngjang-dong

Myeongjang-dong (Korean: 명장동) is a dong in Dongnae-gu, Busan, South Korea. It is divided into two administrative dong, Myeongjang 1-dong and Myeongjang 2-dong. The total area is 1.78 km^{2}, with a population of 39,656. It borders Geumjeong-gu on the north. The old site of the Dongnae eupseong site is located in Myeongjang-dong.

The name "Myeongjang" was first applied to this region in the early Joseon Dynasty. The area was officially designated Myeongjang-ri in 1740. It gained dong status in 1953. It was split into two administrative dong in 1990. Each dong office has ten employees.

== See also ==
- Geography of South Korea
- Subdivisions of South Korea
