= Heosimcheong Spa =

Massive thermal spring spa in South Korea

Coordinates: 35°13′16″N 129°04′57″E

Heosimcheong (Korean: 허심청; Hanja: 虛心廳) is a hot spring and spa in Oncheon-dong, Dongnae District, Busan, South Korea.

Located about 10km north of downtown Busan, Heosimcheong has facilities to accommodate 3,000 guests on five floors. Known to have been bathed in by kings of Silla (57 BCE – 935 CE), the spring has been developed into a 4,300 m^{2} urban complex with 4 million visits a year.

The current building was completed in 1991. Separated and largely duplicated by gender, facilities include hot, tepid and cool baths, fountains, saunas (including an "igloo" chilled to 0 °C), mud baths, massage, exfoliation, and exercise rooms. The spring water is alkali, emerging at 45 °C to 56 °C, and has the highest concentration of magnesium in Korea. Forty different bath types are available, depending on the season, with different medicinal herbs and fruit essences, including cherry, pepper, lavender and citrus, mixed with the water. The complex also has a nightclub, a lounge, several banquet halls, a bakery, a bar (HurShimChung Bräu) and a Japanese restaurant, and is connected to a neighboring hotel by skywalk.

== See also ==
- Jjimjilbang
