= Provinces of South Korea =

Province 도 (道)
- Map of South Korean provinces, including claimed ones controlled by North Korea with the military demarcation line running through.
- Category: Unitary state
- Location: South Korea
- Number: 21; 14 controlled by ROK; 5 controlled by DPRK; 2 split between ROK and DPRK
- Populations: 276,589 (Sejong) – 13,413,459 (Gyeonggi Province)
- Areas: 1,849 km^{2} (714 sq mi) (Jeju) – 19,030 km^{2} (7,350 sq mi) (North Gyeongsang Province) – 20,569 km^{2} (7,942 sq mi) (Gangwon including the North Korean province)

- Province
- Hangul: 도
- Hanja: 道
- RR: do
- MR: to

Special self-governing province
- Hangul: 특별자치도
- Hanja: 特別自治道
- RR: teukbyeoljachido
- MR: t'ŭkpyŏljach'ido

Provinces are one of the first-level divisions within South Korea. There are 8 provinces in South Korea: North Chungcheong, South Chungcheong, Gangwon State, Gyeonggi, North Gyeongsang, South Gyeongsang, North Jeolla, and Jeju Province.

South Jeolla was formerly a province, but on July 1, 2026, it was merged with the city of Gwangju into the Special Metropolitan City Jeonnam-Gwangju.

== History ==
Although the details of local administration have changed dramatically over time, the basic outline of the current three-tiered system was implemented under the reign of Gojong in 1895. A similar system also remains in use in North Korea.

== Types ==
Provinces (도, 道) are the highest-ranked administrative divisions in South Korea, which use the East Asian traditional name Circuit (administrative division). Along with the common provinces, there are four types of special administrative divisions with equal status: special self-governing province, special city, metropolitan city, and special self-governing city.

Special Self-governing Province or State (특별자치도, 特別自治道) is a type of province with more autonomy over its economy and more powers given to the provincial government. Jeju, Gangwon, and Jeonbuk are the only special self-governing provinces in South Korea, while Seoul is the only special city and Sejong is the only special self-governing city.

== Administration ==
Governors for the provinces and mayors for the special/metropolitan cities are elected every four years. Current governors and mayors are listed at list of governors of South Korea.

== List of provinces ==
Name	Official English name	Hangul	Hanja	ISO	Pop. (2020)	Area (km^{2})	Density 2020 (/km^{2})	Capital	Historical province	Cultural region	Abbreviation		
North Chungcheong	Chungcheongbuk-do	충청북도	忠淸北道	KR-43	1,632,088	7,433	219.6	Cheongju	Chungcheong	Hoseo	Chungbuk	충북	忠北
South Chungcheong	Chungcheongnam-do	충청남도	忠淸南道	KR-44	2,176,636	8,204	265.3	Hongseong	Chungcheong	Hoseo	Chungnam	충남	忠南
Gangwon	Gangwon State	강원특별자치도	江原特別自治道	KR-42	1,521,763	20,569	74.0	Chuncheon	Gangwon	Gwandong	Gangwon	강원	江原
Gyeonggi	Gyeonggi-do	경기도	京畿道	KR-41	13,511,676	10,171	1,328.5	Suwon	Gyeonggi	Sudogwon	Gyeonggi	경기	京畿
North Gyeongsang	Gyeongsangbuk-do	경상북도	慶尙北道	KR-47	2,644,757	19,030	139.0	Andong	Gyeongsang	Yeongnam	Gyeongbuk	경북	慶北
South Gyeongsang	Gyeongsangnam-do	경상남도	慶尙南道	KR-48	3,333,056	10,532	316.5	Changwon	Gyeongsang	Yeongnam	Gyeongnam	경남	慶南
North Jeolla	Jeonbuk State	전북특별자치도	全北特別自治道	KR-45	1,802,766	8,043	224.1	Jeonju	Jeolla	Honam	Jeonbuk	전북	全北
Jeju	Jeju Special; Self-Governing Province	제주특별자치도	濟州特別自治道	KR-49	670,858	1,849	362.8	Jeju	Jeolla	Jeju	Jeju	제주	濟州

== Claimed provinces ==
South Korea claims five provinces on the territory controlled by North Korea. These claimed provinces are managed by the Committee for the Five Northern Korean Provinces (Korean: 이북5도위원회; Hanja: 以北五道委員會). These provinces are based on the divisions of the Korean Empire era and are different from the present North Korean provinces.

Historical province	Name	Hangul	Hanja	Area (km^{2})	Capital	Cultural region	Abbreviation		
Hamgyeong	North Hamgyeong	함경북도	咸鏡北道	20,345	Cheongjin	Gwanbuk	Hambuk	함북	咸北
Hamgyeong	South Hamgyeong	함경남도	咸鏡南道	31,977	Hamheung	Gwannam	Hamnam	함남	咸南
Pyeongan	North Pyeongan	평안북도	平安北道	28,443	Sinuiju	Gwanseo	Pyeongbuk	평북	平北
Pyeongan	South Pyeongan	평안남도	平安南道	14,944	Pyeongyang	Gwanseo	Pyeongnam	평남	平南
Hwanghae	Hwanghae	황해도	黃海道	16,744	Haeju	Haeseo	Hwanghae	황해	黃海

== See also ==
- Administrative divisions of South Korea
- Special cities of South Korea
