= Allak-dong =

Coordinates: 35.196°N 129.105°E

- Hangul: 안락동
- Hanja: 安樂洞
- RR: Allak-dong
- MR: Allak-tong

Allak-dong (Korean: 안락동) is a dong in Dongnae District, Busan, South Korea. It is divided into two administrative dong, Allak 1-dong and Allak 2-dong. The total area is 2.31 km^{2}, with a population of 18,560. It borders Geumjeong District on the north.

The name "Allak" gained dong status in 1953. It was split into two administrative dong in 1990. Each dong office has ten employees.

== See also ==
- Geography of South Korea
- Administrative divisions of South Korea
