= Committee for the Five Northern Korean Provinces =

South Korean government body

- 이북5도위원회
- Emblem

- Flag

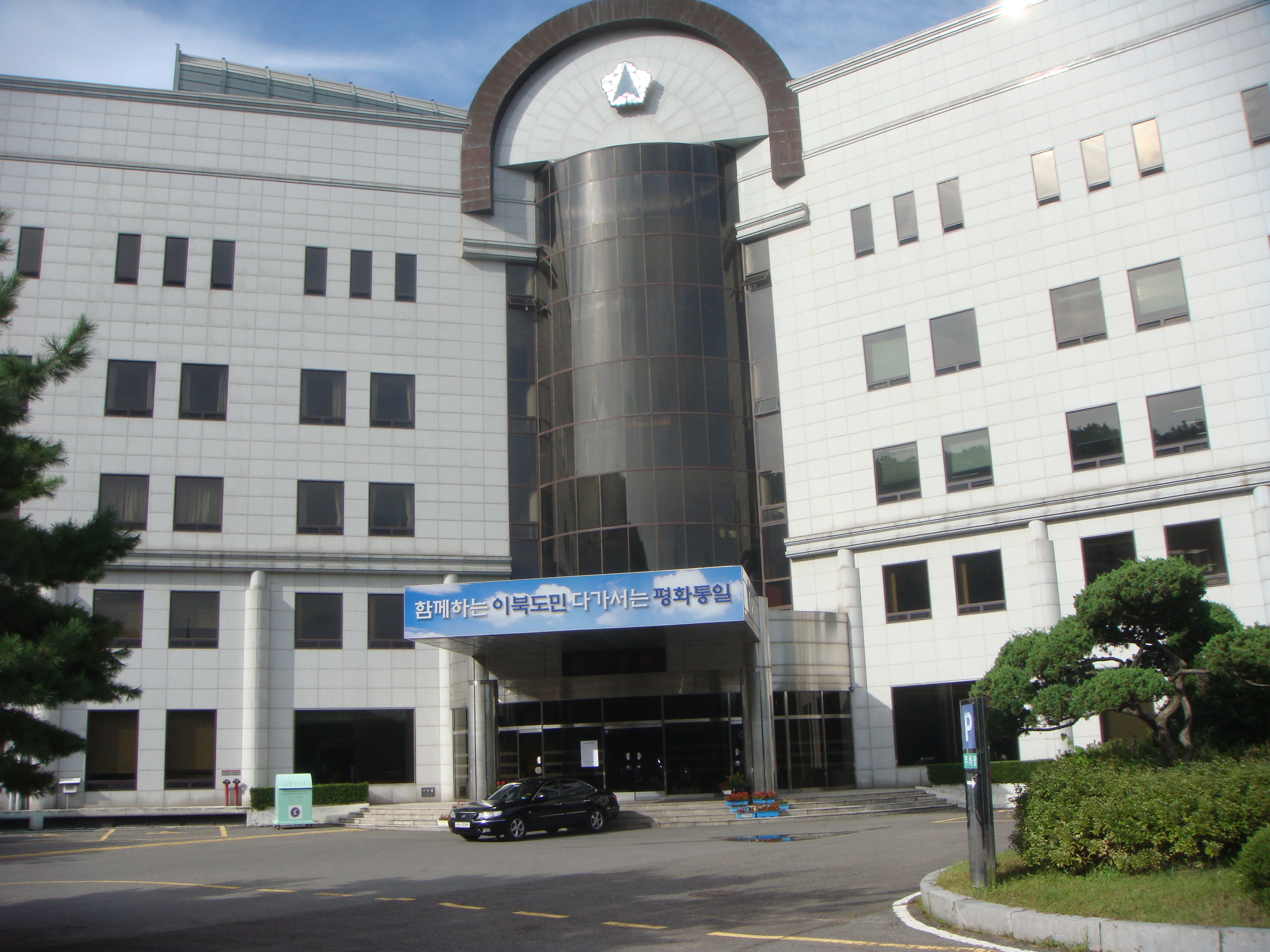
- Headquarters

Agency overview
- Type: Government body under the South Korean Ministry of the Interior and Safety
- Jurisdiction: Government of South Korea
- Headquarters: 64 Bibong-gil, Jongno, Seoul
- Agency executives: Yi Se-oong, Chairman, also Governor of North Pyeongan Province; Jeong Jyeong-jo, Governor of South Pyeongan Province; Kee Duck-young, Governor of Hwanghae Province; Ji Seong-ho, Governor of North Hamgyeong Province; Son Yang-young, Governor of South Hamgyeong Province
- Parent department: Ministry of the Interior and Safety
- Website: www.ibuk5do.go.kr

Map
- Map of North Korea with provincial divisions claimed by South Korea

Korean name
- Hangul: 이북5도위원회
- Hanja: 以北五道委員會
- RR: Ibuk 5do wiwonhoe
- MR: Ibuk 5to wiwŏnhoe

The Committee for the Five Northern Korean Provinces (Korean: 이북5도위원회; lit. "The North's Five Provinces Committee" (Note: The Committee does not capitalize "northern".)) is a South Korean government body which is de jure responsible for governing the provinces controlled by North Korea, and de facto responsible for providing support to North Korean defectors living in South Korea.

== History ==
The committee was established in 1949, when President Syngman Rhee appointed governors to the five northern provinces, highlighting the need of functioning local governments ready to step in in case of Korean reunification. The body is placed under the Ministry of the Interior and Safety.

The South Korean government formally claims to be the sole legitimate government of the entirety of the Korean Peninsula. The South Korean government does not officially recognize any changes to the borders of the northern provinces made by the North Korean government since its establishment in 1949.

== Role ==
The committee operates as a government-in-exile officially responsible for the administration of the five Korean provinces located entirely north of the 38th Parallel, also known as the Military Demarcation Line. The President of South Korea appoints governors for each of the five provinces. The district and counties of the provinces have advisory committees and appointed township officials. The governors office coordinates with advisers and committee members tasked with writing policy plans for education, public health, religious freedom and local governance in these provinces.

However, their role is largely symbolic (comparable to titular bishops), as the territory is under the effective jurisdiction of North Korea. The committee's main practical function is to provide support to North Korean defectors living in South Korea, including organizing resettlements and social events.

Despite its name, the committee plays no part in North Korea–South Korea relations; North Korean affairs are handled by the Ministry of Unification. In the event of a North Korean collapse, contingency plans call for a new government body to be set up to administer the North under the leadership of the Unification Minister. In that case, the five governors would have to resign and the committee would be disbanded.

== North Hamgyeong ==
North Hamgyeong Province
- Flag

- Country: South Korea
- Capital: Cheongjin
- Subdivisions: 3 cities; 11 counties

Government
  - Governor: Ji Seong-ho

Area
  - Total: 20,345 km^{2} (7,855 sq mi)

Korean name
- Hangul: 함경북도
- Hanja: 咸鏡北道
- RR: Hamgyeongbuk-do
- MR: Hamgyŏngbuk-to

North Hamgyeong Province (Korean: 함경북도; Korean pronunciation: [hamɡjʌŋbukt͈o]) corresponds to North Korea's North Hamgyong Province, Rason Special City and part of Ryanggang Province.

North Hamgyeong is divided into 3 cities (si) and 11 counties (gun):

Cities:

- Cheongjin (청진; 淸津)
  - 60 dong
- Najin (나진; 羅津)
  - 80 dong
- Seongjin (성진; 城津)
  - 11 dong

Counties:

- Gyeongseong (경성; 鏡城) (administrative center at Gyeongseong-myeon)
  - 2 eup : Jueul, Eodaejin
  - 4 myeon : Gyeongseong, Eorang, Jubuk, Junam
- Myeongcheon (명천; 明川) (administrative center at Sangwubuk-myeon)
  - 10 myeon : Sangwubuk, Dong, Sangga, Sanggo, Sangwunam, Seo, Agan, Haga, Hago, Hawu
- Gilju (길주; 吉州)
  - 1 eup : Gilju
  - 5 myeon : Deoksan, Donghae, Yangsa, Ungpyeong, Jangbaek
- Hakseong (학성; 鶴城) (administrative center at Seongjin)
  - 5 myeon : Hakseo, Hakdong, Hakjung, Haknam, Haksang
- Buryeong (부령; 富寧)
  - 8 myeon : Buryeong, Gwanhae, Bugeo, Samhae, Seosang, Seokmak, Yeoncheon, Cheongam
- Musan (무산; 茂山)
  - 1 eup : Musan
  - 9 myeon : Dong, Samjang, Samsa, Seoha, Eoha, Yeonsa, Yeonsang, Yeongbuk, Punggye
- Hoenyeong (회녕; 會寧)
  - 1 eup : Hoenyeong
  - 6 myeon : Byeokseong, Boeul, Yongheung, Changdu, Paleul, Hwapyeong
- Jongseong (종성; 鍾城)
  - 6 myeon : Jongseong, Namsan, Yonggye, Punggok, Haengyeong, Hwabang
- Onseong (온성; 穩城)
  - 6 myeon : Onseong, Namyang, Mipo, Yeongwa, Yeongchung, Hunyung
- Gyeongwon (경원; 慶源)
  - 6 myeon : Gyeongwon, Dongwon, Asan, Annong, Yongdeok, Yudeok
- Gyeongheung (경흥; 慶興) (administrative center at Unggi-eup)
  - 2 eup : Unggi, Aoji
  - 3 myeon : Gyeonghung, Punghae, Noseo

== South Hamgyeong ==
South Hamgyeong Province
- Flag

- Country: South Korea
- Capital: Hamheung
- Subdivisions: 3 cities; 16 counties

Government
  - Governor: Son Yang-young

Area
  - Total: 31,977 km^{2} (12,346 sq mi)

Korean name
- Hangul: 함경남도
- Hanja: 咸鏡南道
- RR: Hamgyeongnam-do
- MR: Hamgyŏngnam-do

South Hamgyeong Province (Korean: 함경남도; Korean pronunciation: [hamɡjʌŋnamdo]) corresponds to North Korea's South Hamgyong Province, as well as parts of Ryanggang Province, Chagang Province, Kangwon Province and China's Jilin Province (several parts of Hyesan County (Heaven Lake) are under the rule of China, and other parts of same county are de jure claimed by Taiwan).

South Hamgyeong is divided into 3 cities (si) and 16 counties (gun):

Cities:

- Hamheung (함흥; 咸興)
  - 78 dong
- Heungnam (흥남; 興南)
  - 75 dong
- Wonsan (원산; 元山)
  - 88 dong

Counties:

- Hamju (함주; 咸州) (administrative center at Hamheung)
  - 16 myeon : Gigok, Deoksan, Dongcheon, Sampyeong, Sanggicheon, Sangjoyang, Seondeok, Yeonpo, Jubuk, Juseo, Juji, Cheonseo, Cheonwon, Toejo, Hagicheon, Hajoyang
- Sinheung (신흥; 新興)
  - 8 myeon : Sinheung, Gapyeong, Sangwoncheon, Seogocheon, Yeonggo, Wonpyeong, Hawoncheon, Dongsang
- Jeongpyeong (정평; 定平)
  - 8 myeon : Chongpyong, Gosan, Gwangdeok, Gwirim, Munsan, Sinsang, Jangwon, Jui
- Yeongheung (영흥; 永興)
  - 1 eup : Yeongheung
  - 11 myeon : Goryeong, Deokheung, Seonheung, Sunryeong, Eokgi, Yodeok, Inheung, Jangheung, Jinpyeong, Hodo, Heongcheon
- Gowon (고원; 高原)
  - 1 eup : Gowon
  - 5 myeon : Gunnae, Sangok, Sangsan, Sudong, Ungok
- Muncheon (문천; 文川) (administrative center at Muncheon-myeon)
  - 1 eup : Cheonnae
  - 7 myeon : Muncheon, Deokwon, Myeonggu, Bukseong, Unrim, Pungsang, Pungha
- Anbyeon (안변; 安邊)
  - 7 myeon : Anbyeon, Ando, Seokwangsa, Baehwa, Seogok, Singosan, Sinmo
- Hongwon (홍원; 洪原)
  - 1 eup : Hongwon
  - 6 myeon : Gyeongwun, Bohyeon, Samho, Yongwon, Yongpo, Unhak
- Bukcheong (북청; 北靑)
  - 3 eup : Bukcheong, Sinpo, Sinchang
  - 11 myeon : Gahoe, Geosan, Deokseong, Sanggeoseo, Seongdae, Sokhu, Sin-Bukcheong, Yanghwa, Igok, Hageoseo, Huchang
- Iwon (이원; 利原) (administrative center at Iwon-myeon)
  - 1 eup : Chaho
  - 3 myeon : Iwon, Dong, Namsong
- Dancheon (단천; 端川)
  - 1 eup : Dancheon
  - 8 myeon : Gwangcheon, Damduil, Bokgwi, Bukdoil, Suha, Sinman, Ijung, Hada
- Jangjin (장진; 長津)
  - 7 myeon : Jangjin, Dongmun, Dongha, Buk, Sangnam, Seohan, Jungnam
- Pungsan (풍산; 豐山)
  - 5 myeon : Pungsan, Ansan, Ansu, Ungyi, Cheonnam
- Samsu (삼수; 三水)
  - 7 myeon : Samsu, Geumsu, Gwanheung, Samseo, Sinpa, Jaseo, Hoin
- Gapsan (갑산; 甲山)
  - 5 myeon : Gapsan, Dongin, Jindong, Sannam, Hoerin
- Hyesan (혜산; 惠山)
  - 1 eup : Hyesan
  - 5 myeon : Daejin, Byeoldong, Bocheon, Bongdu, Unheung

== Hwanghae ==
Hwanghae Province
- Flag

- Country: South Korea
- Capital: Haeju
- Subdivisions: 3 cities; 17 counties

Government
  - Governor: Kee Duck-young

Area
  - Total: 16,743.66 km^{2} (6,464.76 sq mi)

Korean name
- Hangul: 황해도
- Hanja: 黃海道
- RR: Hwanghae-do
- MR: Hwanghae-do

Hwanghae Province (Korean: 황해도; Korean pronunciation: [hwaŋ.hɛ.do]) corresponds to North Korea's North Hwanghae Province (except Kaesong which is claimed to be part of Gyeonggi Province) and South Hwanghae Province.

Hwanghae is divided into 3 cities (si) and 17 counties (gun):

Cities:

- Haeju (Korean: 해주; Hanja: 海州)
  - 21 dong
- Sariwon (사리원; 沙里院)
  - 12 dong
- Songnim (송림; 松林)
  - 28 dong

Counties:

- Byeokseong (벽성; 碧城) (administrative center at Haeju)
  - 20 myeon : Gajwa, Geomdan, Gosan, Nadeok, Daegeo, Donggang, Miyul, Seoseok, Songrim, Unsan, Wolrok, Janggok, Haenam, Geumsan, Naesong, Dongun, Yeongcheon, Ilsin, Cheongryong, Chuhwa
- Yeonbaek (연백; 延白)
  - 1 eup : Yeonan
  - 19 myeon : Gwaegung, Geumsan, Dochon, Mokdan, Bongbuk, Bongseo, Seoksan, Songbong, Onjeong, Yongdo, Unsan, Yugok, Euncheon, Haeryong, Haeseong, Haewol, Honam, Hodong, Hwaseong
- Ongjin (옹진; 甕津)
  - 1 eup : Ongjin
  - 10 myeon : Gacheon, Gyojeong, Dongnam, Bonggu, Bumin, Buk, Seo, Yongyeon, Yongcheon, Heungmi
- Jangyeon (장연; 長淵)
  - 1 eup : Jangyeon
  - 9 myeon : Nakdo, Daegu, Mokgam, Sokdal, Suntaek, Sinhwa, Yongyeon, Haean, Hunam
- Geumcheon (금천; 金川)
  - 12 Myeon : Geumcheon, Godong, Gui, Sanoe, Seobuk, Seocheon, Oeryu, Ubong, Ungdeok, Jwa, Tosan, Habtan
- Singye (신계; 新溪)
  - 8 myeon : Singye, Go, Dami, Dayul, Maseo, Saji, Jeokyeo, Chon
- Pyeongsan (평산; 平山)
  - 1 eup : Namcheon
  - 13 myeon : Pyongsan, Goji, Geumam, Masan, Munmu, Sangwol, Seobong, Segok, Sinam, Anseong, Yongsan, Insan, Jeokam
- Bongsan (봉산; 鳳山) (administrative center at Sariwon)
  - 13 myeon : Guyeon, Gicheon, Deokjae, Dongseon, Mancheon, Munjeong, Sain, Sansu, Seojeong, Ssangsan, Yeongcheon, Chowa, Toseong
- Seoheung (서흥; 瑞興)
  - 1 eup : Sinmak
  - 10 myeon : Seoheung, Gupo, Naedeok, Do, Maeyang, Mokgam, Sepyeong, Sosa, Yongpyeong, Yulri
- Jaeryeong (재령; 載寧)
  - 1 eup : Jaeryeong
  - 10 myeon : Namryul, Bukryul, Samgang, Sangseong, Seoho, Sinwon, Eunryong, Jangsu, Cheongcheon, Haseong
- Sincheon (신천; 信川)
  - 1 eup : Sincheon
  - 14 myeon : Garyeon, Gasan, Gungheung, Nambu, Nowol, Dura, Munmu, Munhwa, Bukbu, Sancheon, Oncheon, Yongmun, Yongjin, Chori
- Songhwa (송화; 松禾)
  - 13 myeon : Songhwa, Punghae, Dowon, Bongrae, Sangri, Yeonbang, Yeonjeong, Unyu, Yulri, Jangyang, Jinpung, Cheondong
- Eunyul (은율; 殷栗)
  - 7 myeon : Eunyul, Nambu, Bukbu, Seobu, Ildo, Ido, Jangryeon
- Anak (안악; 安岳)
  - 1 eup : Anak
  - 8 myeon : Daewon, Daehaeng, Munsan, Seoha, Angok, Yongmun, Yongsun, Eunhong
- Hwangju (황주; 黃州)
  - 1 eup : Hwangju
  - 11 myeon : Gurak, Guseong, Dochi, Samjeon, Yeongpung, Ingyo, Junam, Cheonju, Cheongryong, Cheongsu, Heukgyo
- Suan (수안; 遂安)
  - 9 myeon : Suan, Gongpo, Daeseong, Daeo, Doso, Sugu, Yeonam, Yulgye, Cheongok
- Goksan (곡산; 谷山)
  - 12 myeon : Goksan, Dohwa, Dongchon, Myeokmi, Bongmyeong, Sangdo, Seochon, Unjung, Iryeong, Cheonggye, Hado, Hwachon

== North Pyeongan ==
North Pyeongan Province
- Flag

- Country: South Korea
- Capital: Sinuiju
- Subdivisions: 1 cities; 19 counties

Government
  - Governor: Yi Se-oong

Area
  - Total: 28,442.9 km^{2} (10,981.9 sq mi)

Korean name
- Hangul: 평안북도
- Hanja: 平安北道
- RR: Pyeonganbuk-do
- MR: P'yŏnganbuk-to

North Pyeongan Province (Korean: 평안북도; Korean pronunciation: [pʰjʌŋanbukt͈o]) corresponds to North Korea's North Pyongan Province, almost all of Chagang Province and a small part of Ryanggang Province.

North Pyeongan is divided into 1 cities (si) and 19 counties (gun):

Cities:

- Sineuiju (Korean: 신의주; Hanja: 新義州)
  - 86 dong

Counties:

- Euiju (Korean: 의주; Hanja: 義州)
  - 1 eup : Uiju
  - 12 myeon : Gasan, Gogwan, Goryeongsak, Goseong, Gwangpyeong, Bihyeon, Songjang, Sujin, Oksang, Wolhwa, Wiwon, Wihwa
- Yongcheon (용천; 龍川)
  - 1 eup : Yongampo
  - 11 myeon : Dongha, Naejung, Dongsang, Bura, Bukjung, Yangseo, Yanggwang, Yangha, Oesang, Oeha, Sindo
- Cheolsan (철산; 鐵山)
  - 6 myeon : Cheolsan, Baekryang, Buseo, Cham, Seorim, Yeohan
- Seoncheon (선천; 宣川)
  - 1 eup : Seoncheon
  - 8 myeon : Gunsan, Nam, Unjong, Dong, Sucheong, Sinbu, Simcheon, Yongyeon, Taesan
- Jeongju (정주; 定州)
  - 1 eup : Jeongju
  - 12 myeon : Galsan, Godeok, Goan, Gwaksan, Gwanju, Namseo, Daejeon, Deokeon, Masan, Anheung, Okcheon, Impo
- Sakju (삭주; 朔州) (administrative center at Sakju-myeon)
  - 1 eup : Cheongsu
  - 7 myeon : Sakju, Gugok, Namseo, Sudong, Supung, Oenam, Yangsan
- Guseong (구성; 龜城)
  - 10 myeon : Guseong, Gwanseo, Nodong, Dongsan, Banghyeon, Sagi, Seosan, Obong, Ihyeon, Cheonma
- Yeongbyeon (영변; 寧邊)
  - 14 myeon : Yeongbyeon, Goseong, Namsong, Namsinhyeon, Doksan, Baekryeong, Bongsan, Buksinhyeon, Sorim, Yeonsan, Ori, Yongsan, Taepyeong, Palwon
- Bakcheon (박천; 博川)
  - 1 eup : Bakcheon
  - 7 myeon : Gasan, Deokan, Dongnam, Seo, Yangga, Yonggye, Cheongryong
- Taecheon (태천; 泰川)
  - 9 myeon : Taecheon, Gangdong, Gangseo, Nam, Dong, Seo, Seoseong, Won, Jangrim
- Unsan (운산; 雲山) (administrative center at Unsan-myeon)
  - 1 eup : Bukjin
  - 4 myeon : Unsan, Dongsin, Seong, Wiyeon
- Changseong (창성; 昌城)
  - 5 myeon : Changseong, Daechang, Dongchang, Sinchang, Cheongsan
- Byeokdong (벽동; 碧潼)
  - 7 myeon : Byeokdong, Gabyeol, Gwonhoe, Seongnam, Songseo, Obuk, Usi
- Chosan (초산; 楚山)
  - 9 myeon : Chosan, Gang, Go, Nam, Dowon, Dong, Song, Pan, Pung
- Wiwon (위원; 渭原)
  - 7 myeon : Wiwon, Daedeok, Seotae, Bongsan, Sungjeong, Wisong, Hwachang
- Heuicheon (희천; 熙川)
  - 1 eup : Heuicheon
  - 7 myeon : Nam, Dong, Dongchang, Buk, Seo, Sinpung, Jangdong, Jin
- Ganggye (강계; 江界)
  - 2 eup : Ganggye, Manpo
  - 15 myeon : Ganbuk, Gosan, Gokha, Gongbuk, Seonggan, Sijung, Eoroe, Oegwi, Yongrim, Iseo, Ipgwan, Jeoncheon, Jongnam, Jongseo, Hwagyeong
- Jaseong (자성; 慈城)
  - 6 myeon : Jaseong, Sampung, Ipyeong, Jaha, Jangto, Junggang
- Huchang (후창; 厚昌)
  - 5 myeon : Huchang, Namsin, Dongheung, Dongsin, Chilpyeong

=== List of historic governors ===
1. Baek Yeong-eop (백영업; 白永燁; 1949–1970)
2. Lee Ha-young (이하영; 李夏榮, 1970–1979)
3. Lee Seok-bong (이석봉; 李碩峰; 1979 – May 1988)
4. Ahn Chi-soon (안치순; 安致淳; May – December 1988)
5. Kim Sa-seong (김사성; 金士檉; 1989 – March 1992)
6. Jang Jung-ryol (장정렬; 張正烈; 1992–1998)
7. Shim Gi-cheol (심기철; 沈基哲; 1998–2000)
8. Paik Hyong-rin (백형린; 白亨麟; 2000–2003)
9. Cha In-tae (차인태; 車仁泰; 2003–2007)
10. Paik Do-woong (백도웅; 白道雄; 2007–2009)
11. Paik Young-chul (백영철; 白永哲; 2009–2012)
12. Paik Gu-seop (백구섭; 白九燮;(2012–2016)
13. Kim Young-chol (김영철; 金永哲; 2016–2019)
14. Oh Yeong-chan (오영찬; 吳永瓚; 2019 – July 2022)
15. Yi Se-oong (이세웅; July 2022 – present)

== South Pyeongan ==
South Pyeongan Province
- Flag

- Country: South Korea
- Capital: Pyeongyang
- Subdivisions: 2 cities; 14 counties

Government
  - Governor: Jeong Jyeong-jo

Area
  - Total: 14,944 km^{2} (5,770 sq mi)

Korean name
- Hangul: 평안남도
- Hanja: 平安南道
- RR: Pyeongannam-do
- MR: P'yŏngannam-do

South Pyeongan Province (Korean: 평안남도; Korean pronunciation: [pʰjʌŋannamdo]) corresponds to North Korea's South Pyongan Province, Pyongyang Directly Governed City and Nampo Special City.

South Pyeongan is divided into 2 cities (si) and 14 counties (gun):

Cities:

- Pyeongyang (평양; 平壤)
  - 91 dong
- Jinnampo (진남포; 鎭南浦)
  - 11 dong

Counties:

- Daedong (대동; 大同) (administrative center at Pyongyang)
  - 14 myeon : Gopyeong, Yongsan, Gimje, Daebo, Namhyeongjesan, Jaegyeongri, Yongak, Busan, Sijok, Imwon, Cheongryong, Yulri, Yongyeon, Namgot
- Junghwa (중화; 中和)
  - 11 myeon : Junghwa, Gandong, Dangjeong, Dongdu, Sangwon, Susan, Sinheung, Yangjeong, Cheongok, Pungdong, Haeap
- Gangseo (강서; 江西)
  - 14 myeon : Gangseo, Dongjin, Banseok, Borim, Seongam, Seongtae, Susan, Sinjeong, Ssangryong, Ingcha, Jeokseong, Jeungsan, Chori, Hamjong
- Gangdong (강동; 江東)
  - 1 eup : Seungho
  - 5 myeon : Gangdong, Gocheon, Bongjin, Samdeung, Wontan
- Yonggang (용강; 龍岡)
  - 13 myeon : Yonggang, Gwiseong, Geumgok, Dami, Daedae, Samhwa, Seohwa, Sinnyeong, Ynaggok, Osin, Yongwol, Jiun, Haeun
- Suncheon (순천; 順川)
  - 1 eup : Suncheon
  - 8 myeon : Seonso, Sain, Hutan, Jasan, Naenam, Bukchang, Eunsan, Sinchang
- Anju (안주; 安州)
  - 1 eup : Anju
  - 7 myeon : Daeni, Dong, Sin-Anju, Yeonho, Yonghwa, Ungok, Ipseok
- Pyeongwon (평원; 平原)
  - 16 myeon : Pyongwon(Yeongyu), Geomsan, Gongdeok, Noji, Deoksan, Dongsong, Dongam, Seohae, Sukcheon, Sunan, Yanghwa, Yongho, Joun, Cheongsan, Hancheon, Haeso
- Gaecheon (개천; 价川)
  - 1 eup : Gaecheon
  - 5 myeon : Bongdong, Buk, Joyang, Jungnam, Jungseo
- Deokcheon (덕천; 德川)
  - 6 myeon : Deokcheon, Seongyang, Ilha, Jamdo, Jamsang, Pungdeok
- Yeongwon (영원; 寧遠)
  - 9 myeon : Yeongwon, Daehung, Deokhwa, Seongryong, Sobaek, Sinseong, Yeongrak, Onhwa, Taegeuk
- Maengsan (맹산; 孟山)
  - 8 myeon : Maengsan, Dong, Bongin, Aejeon, Okcheon, Wonnam, Jideok, Hakcheon
- Yangdeok (양덕; 陽德)
  - 1 eup : Yangdeok
  - 6 myeon : Dongyang, Daeryun, Ssangryong, Ogang, Oncheon, Hwachon
- Seongcheon (성천; 成川)
  - 12 myeon : Seongcheon, Guryong, Neungjung, Daegok, Daegu, Saga, Samdeok, Samheung, Sungin, Ssangryong, Yeongcheon, Tongseon

== Southern provinces with territory in North Korea ==
Two South Korean provinces, Gyeonggi and Gangwon, officially have parts of their territory in North Korea. The South Korean government considers the governors of these two provinces the head of their entire province, including the parts in the North.

- Gyeonggi Province – Gaeseong, Gaepung County & Jangdan County claimed
- Gangwon Province – from Kangwon province – Gimhwa County, Icheon County, Tongcheon County, Pyeonggang County and Hoeyang County claimed

== Symbols ==
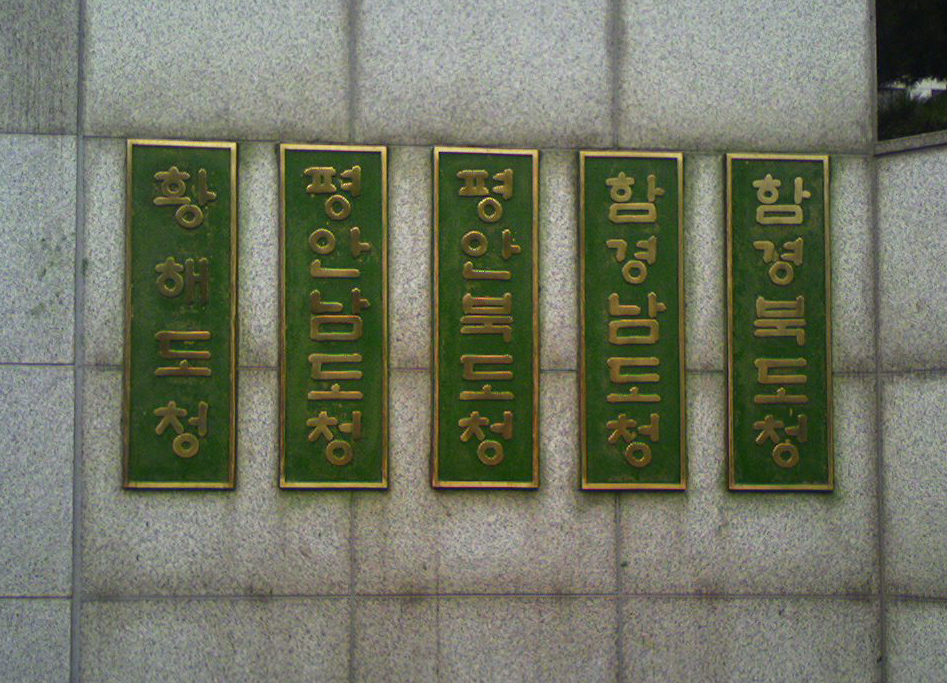
Nameplates for governments of the five northern Korean provinces at the entrance

Flag of the Committee for the Five Northern Korean Provinces (1949–2016)

Emblem of the Committee for the Five Northern Korean Provinces (1949–2016)

Former flag of North Pyeongan Province (1949–2019)

== See also ==
- Eight Provinces of Korea
- Korean reunification
- Committee for the Peaceful Reunification of the Fatherland
