= Hoseo =

Historical Region in South Korea

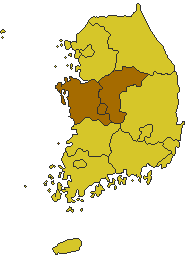

Korean name
- Hangul: 호서
- Hanja: 湖西
- Lit.: West of the lake
- RR: Hoseo
- MR: Hosŏ

Hoseo (Korean: 호서; Korean pronunciation: [ho.sʌ]) is a region coinciding with the former Chungcheong Province in what is now South Korea. Today, the term refers to Daejeon, Sejong City, South Chungcheong and North Chungcheong Provinces. Hoseo people use Chungcheong dialect. The term is often used to refer to people residing in the region. Nowadays Chungcheong is more frequently used instead of Hoseo.

== See also ==
- Daejeon
- Sejong City
- North Chungcheong Province
- South Chungcheong Province
- Regions of Korea
