= Dongnae District =

District of Busan, South Korea

Coordinates: 35°12′13″N 129°05′02″E

Dongnae
- Autonomous District
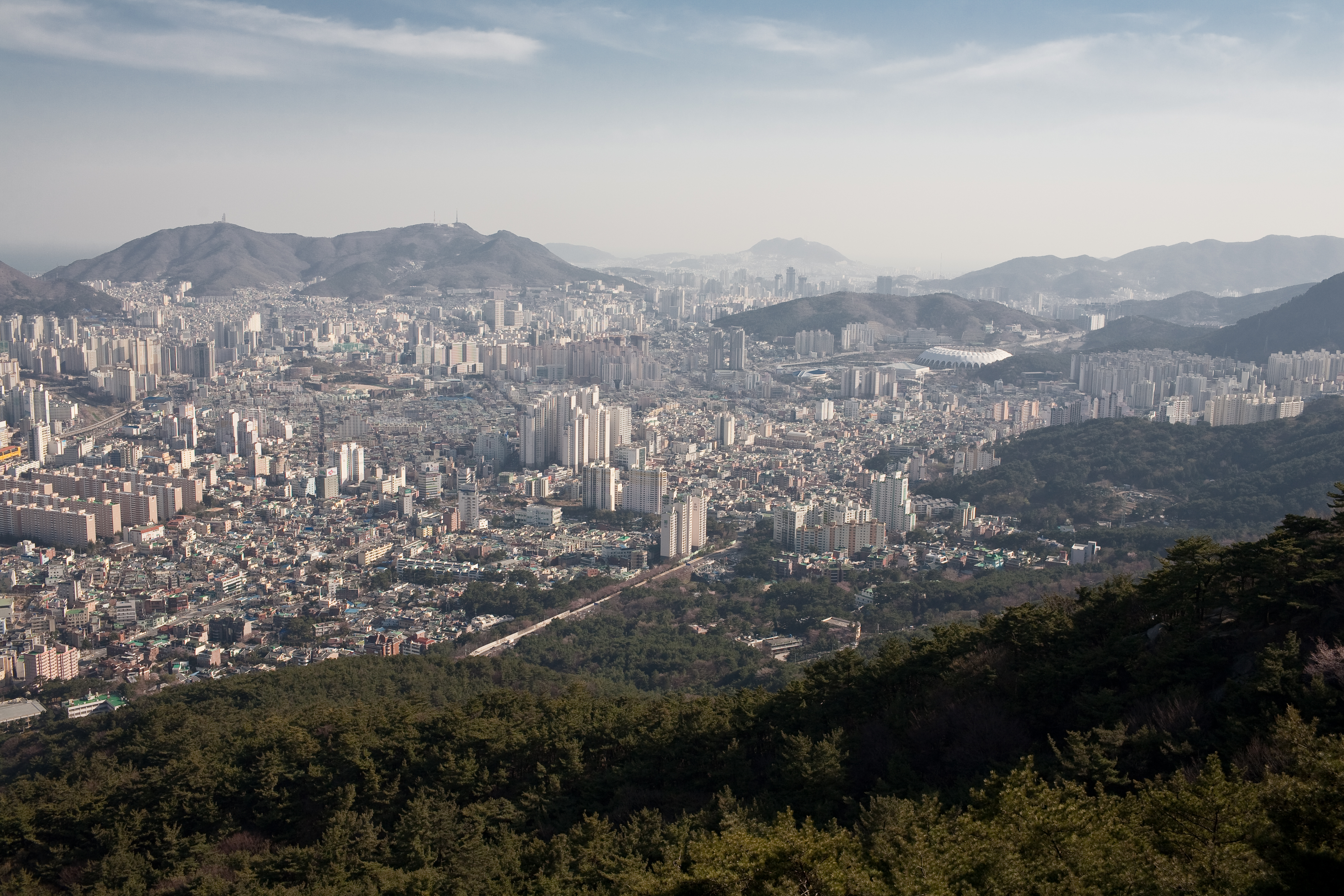

- Flag

- Country: South Korea
- Region: Yeongnam
- Provincial level: Busan
- Administrative divisions: 14 administrative dong

Government
  - Mayor: Jang Joon Yong (장준용)

Population (September 2024)
  - Total: 269,086
  - Density: 16,991/km^{2} (44,010/sq mi)
  - Dialect: Gyeongsang
- Website: Dongnae District Office

Korean name
- Hangul: 동래구
- Hanja: 東萊區
- RR: Dongnae-gu
- MR: Tongnae-gu

Dongnae District (Korean: 동래구) is a gu (district) in central Busan, South Korea.

== Administrative divisions ==
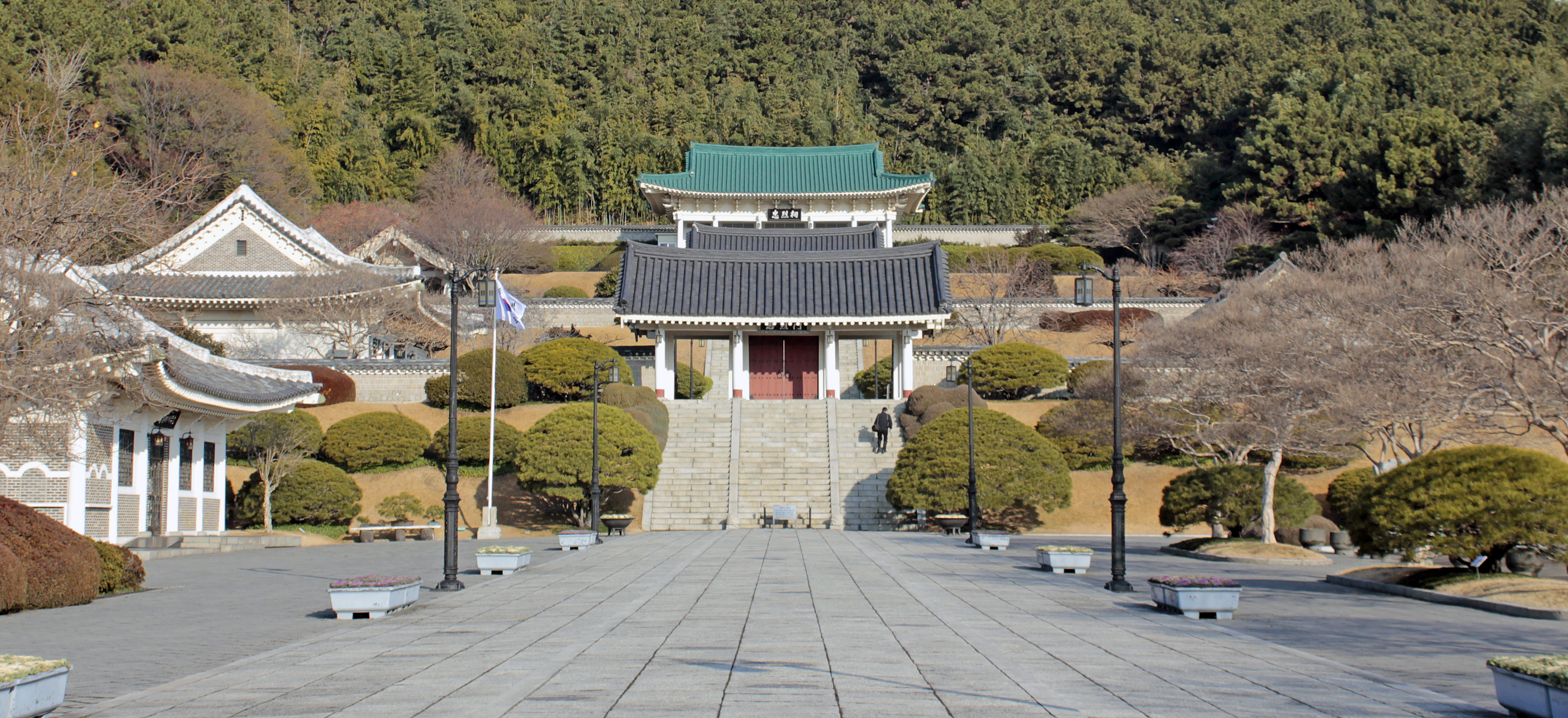
Chungnyeolsa, a shrine dedicated to those who died fighting against Japanese troops during the Japanese invasions of Korea of 1592

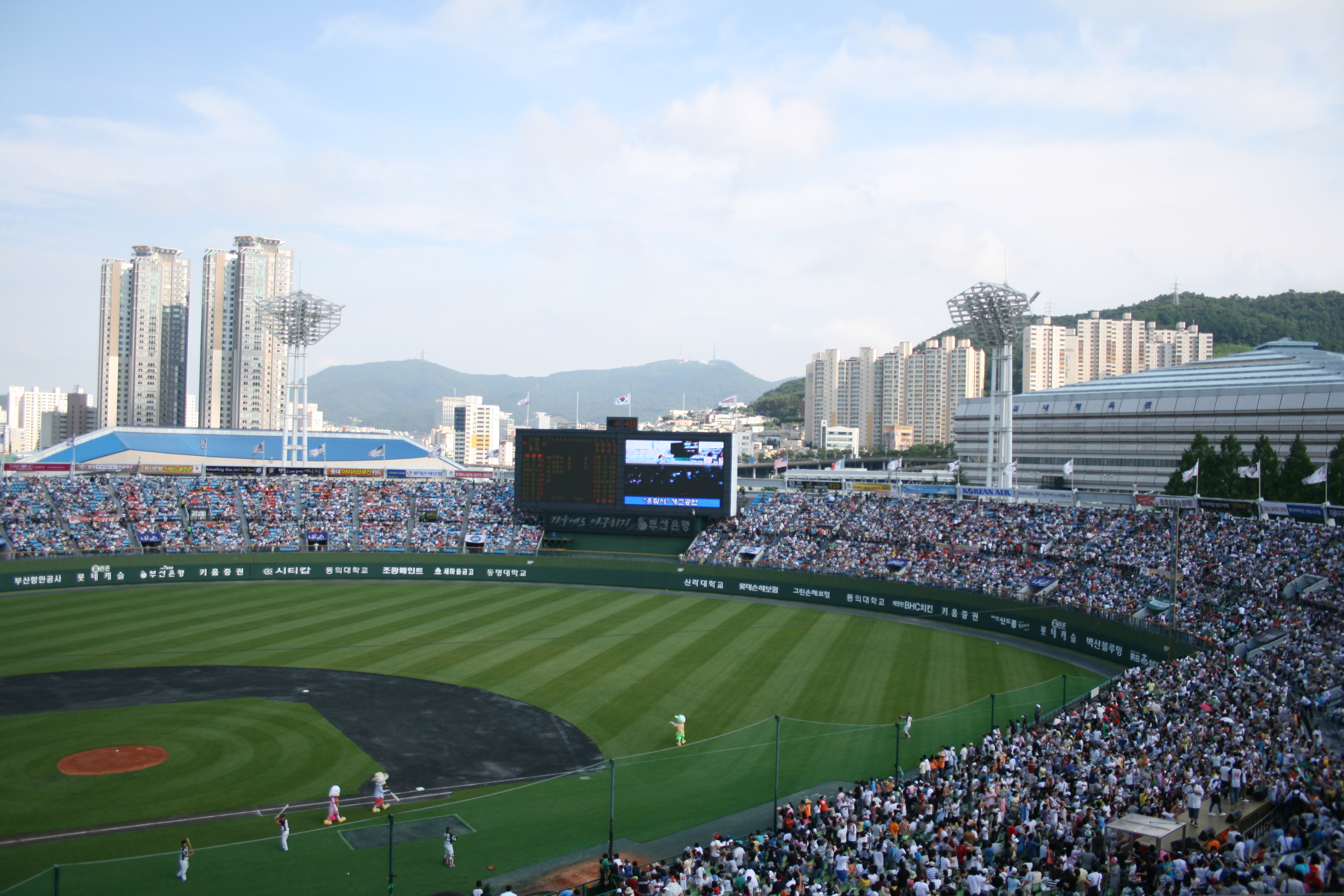
Busan Sajik Baseball Stadium

It has a population of about 300,000, and an area of 16.7 square kilometers. It was once a separate city, the principal port of southeastern Korea. Numerous historical relics are preserved in the area.

Administrative divisions

Dongnae District is divided into seven legal dong, which altogether comprise 14 administrative dong, as follows:

- Allak-dong (2 administrative dong)
- Boksan-dong
- Myeongjang-dong (2 administrative dong)
- Myeongnyun-dong (2 administrative dong)
- Oncheon-dong (3 administrative dong)
- Sajik-dong (3 administrative dong)
- Sumin-dong

== Places of interest ==
Sajik-dong is home to two major sports venues: Sajik Baseball Stadium (home of KBO team Lotte Giants) and Sajik Arena (home to various basketball teams). Both venues, alongside the nearby Sajik Swimming Pool, hosted the baseball, basketball, gymnastics, swimming and diving events of the 2002 Asian Games held in Busan.

Heosimcheong Spa, Asia's largest spa, is in Oncheon-dong.

The Bokcheon-dong Ancient Tombs Park is a tourist attraction and archeological site located in Bokcheon-dong.

== Sister cities ==
- Hongkou, China
- Huế, Vietnam

== Education ==
- Daesung Academy

== See also ==
- Geography of South Korea

== Festivals ==
- Dongnae District Castle Festival opens every October since 1996.
