= Gun (administrative division) =

Type of administrative unit in North and South Korea

- Hangul: 군
- Hanja: 郡
- RR: gun
- MR: kun

A gun (Korean: 군; IPA: [kun]) is an administrative unit in both North Korea and South Korea similar to the unit of county.

In South Korea, a gun has a population of less than 150,000 (more than that would make it a city or si), is less densely populated than a gu, and is more rural in character than either of the other 2 divisions. Gun are comparable to British non-metropolitan districts. Counties are divided into towns (eup) and districts (myeon).

== See also ==
- Administrative divisions of South Korea
- List of counties in South Korea
- History of Korea
- Provinces of Korea
- Commandery (China)
