= Administrative divisions of South Korea =

South Korea is made up of 16 first-tier administrative divisions: 5 metropolitan cities (gwangyeoksi 광역시/廣域市), 1 special city (teukbyeolsi 특별시/特別市), 1 special metropolitan city (tonghapteukbyeolsi 통합특별시/統合特別市), 1 special self-governing city (teukbyeoljachisi 특별자치시/特別自治市), and 8 provinces (do 도/道), including three special self-governing provinces (teukbyeoljachido 특별자치도/特別自治道) and five claimed by the ROK government. These are further subdivided into a variety of smaller entities, including cities (si 시/市), counties (gun 군/郡), districts (gu 구/區), towns (eup 읍/邑), townships (myeon 면/面), neighborhoods (dong 동/洞) and villages (ri 리/里).

== Local government ==
Level	Group name	Type	Hangeul	Hanja	RR Romaja	No. (2026)
1	High-level local governments 광역지방자치단체 (Note: These are not statutory terms; under the Local Autonomy Act, they are legally classified simply as local governments (지방자치단체).) 廣域地方自治團體	Province	도	道	do	5
1	High-level local governments 광역지방자치단체 廣域地方自治團體	Special self-governing province	특별자치도	特別自治道	teukbyeol-jachido	3
1	High-level local governments 광역지방자치단체 廣域地方自治團體	Special city	특별시	特別市	teukbyeolsi	1
1	High-level local governments 광역지방자치단체 廣域地方自治團體	Special metropolitan city	통합특별시	統合特別市	tonghap-teukbyeolsi	1
1	High-level local governments 광역지방자치단체 廣域地方自治團體	Metropolitan city	광역시	廣域市	gwangyeoksi	5
1	High-level local governments 광역지방자치단체 廣域地方自治團體	Special self-governing city	특별자치시	特別自治市	teukbyeol-jachisi	1
2	Low-level local autonomy 기초지방자치단체 基礎地方自治團體	City	시	市	si	60
2	Low-level local autonomy 기초지방자치단체 基礎地方自治團體	City (specific)	시 (특정시)	市 (特定市)	si (teukjeongsi)	15
2	Low-level local autonomy 기초지방자치단체 基礎地方自治團體	County	군	郡	gun	82
2	Low-level local autonomy 기초지방자치단체 基礎地方自治團體	District (autonomous)	구 (자치구)	區 (自治區)	gu (jachigu)	69
3	N/A	City (administrative)	시 (행정시)	市 (行政市)	si (haengjeongsi)	2
3	N/A	District (non-autonomous)	구 (일반구)	區 (一般區)	gu (ilbangu)	35
4	N/A	Town	읍	邑	eup	216
4	N/A	Township	면	面	myeon	1198
4	N/A	Neighborhood (legal-status)	동 (법정동)	洞 (法定洞)	dong (beopjeongdong)	20275
4	N/A	Neighborhood (administrative)	동 (행정동)	洞 (行政洞)	dong (haengjeongdong)	3618
5	N/A	Urban Village	통	統	tong	
5	N/A	Rural Village	리	里	ri	
6	N/A	Hamlet	반	班	ban	

== Provincial-level divisions ==
The top tier of administrative divisions are the provincial-level divisions, of which there are several types: provinces (including special self-governing provinces), metropolitan cities, special cities, special metropolitan cities, and special self-governing cities. The governors of the provincial-level divisions are elected every four years.

Code	Emblem	Name	Official English name	Capital	Hangul	Hanja	Population 2020 Census	Area (km^{2})	Population density 2022 (per km^{2})
KR-11		Seoul Special City	Seoul	Jung District	서울특별시	서울特別市	9,586,195	605.20	15,578.16
N/A (Note: Previously KR-29 for Gwangju and KR-46 for Jeollanam-do. It is assigned KR-12 under the Standard Code for Administration (행정표준코드).)		Jeonnam-Gwangju Special Metropolitan City	Jeonnam-Gwangju Special Metropolitan City	Suncheon, Muan County, Seo District	전남광주통합특별시	全南光州統合特別市	3,266,380	12,748.24	3,002.38
KR-26		Busan Metropolitan City	Busan	Yeonje District	부산광역시	釜山廣域市	3,349,016	770.04	4,309.46
KR-27		Daegu Metropolitan City	Daegu	Jung District, Buk District	대구광역시	大邱廣域市	2,410,700	883.49	2,675.25
KR-28		Incheon Metropolitan City	Incheon	Namdong District	인천광역시	仁川廣域市	2,945,454	1,062.63	2,782.40
KR-30		Daejeon Metropolitan City	Daejeon	Seo District	대전광역시	大田廣域市	1,488,435	539.85	2,681.14
KR-31		Ulsan Metropolitan City	Ulsan	Nam District	울산광역시	蔚山廣域市	1,135,423	1,057.14	1,047.01
KR-50		Sejong Special Self-Governing City	Sejong Special Self-Governing City		세종특별자치시	世宗特別自治市	346,275	465.23	824.93
KR-41		Gyeonggi-do	Gyeonggi Province	Suwon, Uijeongbu	경기도	京畿道	13,511,676	10,184	1,336.10
KR-42		Gangwon Special Self-Governing Province	Gangwon State	Chuncheon	강원특별자치도	江原特別自治道	1,521,763	16,875	91.06
KR-43		Chungcheongbuk-do	North Chungcheong Province	Cheongju	충청북도	忠淸北道	1,632,088	7,433	215.34
KR-44		Chungcheongnam-do	South Chungcheong Province	Hongseong County	충청남도	忠淸南道	2,176,636	8,204	258.08
KR-45		Jeonbuk Special Self-Governing Province	Jeonbuk State	Jeonju	전북특별자치도	全北特別自治道	1,802,766	8,067	219.31
KR-47		Gyeongsangbuk-do	North Gyeongsang Province	Andong, Pohang	경상북도	慶尙北道	2,644,757	19,030	136.64
KR-48		Gyeongsangnam-do	South Gyeongsang Province	Changwon, Jinju	경상남도	慶尙南道	3,333,056	10,533	311.26
KR-49		Jeju Special Self-Governing Province	Jeju Special Self-Governing Province	Jeju City	제주특별자치도	濟州特別自治道	670,858	1,849	366.74

== Municipal-level divisions ==
A map of all South Korean metropolitan cities' districts (gu), municipal cities (si), and counties (gun)

=== Si (city) ===
A si (시; 市, pronounced [ɕi]) is one of the divisions of a province, along with gun. A city must have a neighborhood (dong) and can have towns (eup), townships (myeon) if the city is combined with urban and rural areas. Once an eup of a county (gun) attains a population of 50,000, the county can become a city. A city with a population of over 500,000 (such as Suwon, Cheongju, Cheonan and Jeonju) is considered as a specific city, which can set non-autonomous districts (gu). City with a population of over 1,000,000, it can be promoted to a metropolitan city if the need is recognized. (Not as specified by law but customarily, such as Seoul (1946), Busan (1963), Incheon (1981), Daegu (1981), Gwangju (1986), Daejeon (1989) Ulsan (1997)) An administrative city does not have a city council and the mayor of the city is appointed by the provincial governor. (Jeju-si, Seogwipo-si)

=== Gun (county) ===
A gun (군; 郡) is one of the subdivisions of a provincial-level division. A gun has a population of less than 150,000 (more than that would make it a city or si), is less densely populated than a gu, and is more rural in character than either of the other 2 divisions. Gun are comparable to British non-metropolitan districts. Counties are divided into towns (eup) and townships (myeon). The metropolitan cities of Busan, Daegu, Incheon and Ulsan contain gun as well due to operating at a provincial level over local, non-urban areas.

=== Gu (district) ===
A gu (구; 區), or a district, is a possible division within cities which have more than 500,000 people. Gu are similar to boroughs in some Western countries, and a gu office handles many of the functions that would be handled by the city in other jurisdictions. Gu are divided into neighborhoods (dong).

== Submunicipal level divisions ==
=== Eup (town) ===
An eup (읍; 邑) is similar to the unit of town. Along with myeon, an eup is one of the divisions of a county (gun), and of some cities (si) with a population of less than 500,000. The main town or towns in a county—or the secondary town or towns within a city's territory—are designated as eup. Towns are subdivided into villages (ri). In order to form an eup, the minimum population required is 20,000.

=== Myeon (township) ===
A myeon (면; 面) is one of the divisions – along with eup – of a county (gun) and some cities (si) of fewer than 500,000 population. Myeons have smaller populations than eups and represent the rural areas of a county or city. Myeons are subdivided into villages (ri). The minimum population limit is 6,000.

=== Dong (neighborhood) ===
A dong (동; 洞) is the primary division of districts (gu), and of those cities (si) which are not divided into districts. The dong is the smallest level of urban government to have its own office and staff. In some cases, a single legal dong is divided into several administrative dong. Administrative dong are usually distinguished from one another by number (as in the case of Myeongjang 1-dong and Myeongjang 2-dong). In such cases, each administrative dong has its own office and staff.

The primary division of a dong is the tong (통; 統), but divisions at this level and below are seldom used in daily life. Some populous dong are subdivided into ga (가; 街), which are not a separate level of government, but only exist for use in addresses. Many major thoroughfares in Seoul, Suwon, and other cities are also subdivided into ga.

=== Ri (village) ===
A ri (리; 里) is the only division of towns (eup) and townships (myeon). The ri is the smallest level of rural government to contain any significant number of people.

== History ==
Although the details of local administration have changed over time, the basic outline of the current three-tiered system was implemented under the reign of Gojong in 1895. A similar system also remains in use in North Korea.

== See also ==
- Administrative divisions of North Korea
- ISO 3166-2:KR, ISO codes for cities and provinces in South Korea
- List of cities in South Korea
- List of South Korean regions by GDP
- Provinces of Korea
- Special cities of South Korea
