= 關東 =

關東 (pinyin: Guān dōng; Wade–Giles: Kwan^{1}Tung^{1}; Hanja for Hangul: 관동 Gwan dong), 关东 (Simplified Chinese), or 関東 (Japanese Kanto), all literally meaning East of the Pass, may refer to the following:

- Manchuria, a region historically called as Guandong in Northeastern China
  - Kwantung Army (Japanese: 関東軍 Kantōgun), a unit of the Imperial Japanese Army
  - Kwantung Leased Territory (Japanese: 関東州 Kantōshū), a Japanese possession in Northeastern China until the end of World War II
- Kanto, several regions in Japan
- Gwandong, a region in both North and South Korea

== See also ==
- Guandong (disambiguation)
- Kanto (disambiguation)
- 關西 (disambiguation)
