= Guandong =

Guandong or Kwantung may refer to:

- Guandong (關東), a historical name for Manchuria, literally translating to "east of (Shanhai) Pass"
  - The Guandong Peninsula, meaning the Liaodong Peninsula, a peninsula extending from southern Guandong
  - Kwantung Leased Territory, part of the Guandong Peninsula controlled by Russia and later Japan from 1898 to 1945
- Guandong (關東), a historical name for North China Plain, literally translating to "east of (Tong) Pass"

== Towns ==
- Guandong, Guangxi (官垌), a town in Pubei County, Guangxi, China
- Guandong, Guizhou (贯洞), a town in Congjiang County, Guizhou, China

== See also ==
- Kanto, same term in Japanese
- Gwandong, same term in Korean
- Guangdong, a coastal province in South China
