= 關西 =

關西 (pinyin: Guān xī; Wade–Giles: Kwan^{1}si^{1}; Hanja for Hangul: 관서 Gwan seo), 关西 (Simplified Chinese), or 関西 (Japanese Kansai), all literally meaning West of the Pass, may refer to the following:

- Area west to Hangu Pass or Tong Pass in ancient China
- Guanxi, Hsinchu County, Taiwan
- Guanxi Town (关西镇), Longnan, Jiangxi province, China
- Kansai, a region in Japan
- Kwanso, a region in North Korea

== See also ==
- Guanxi
- Kansai (disambiguation)
- 關東 (disambiguation)
