= 2024–25 South-West Indian Ocean cyclone season =

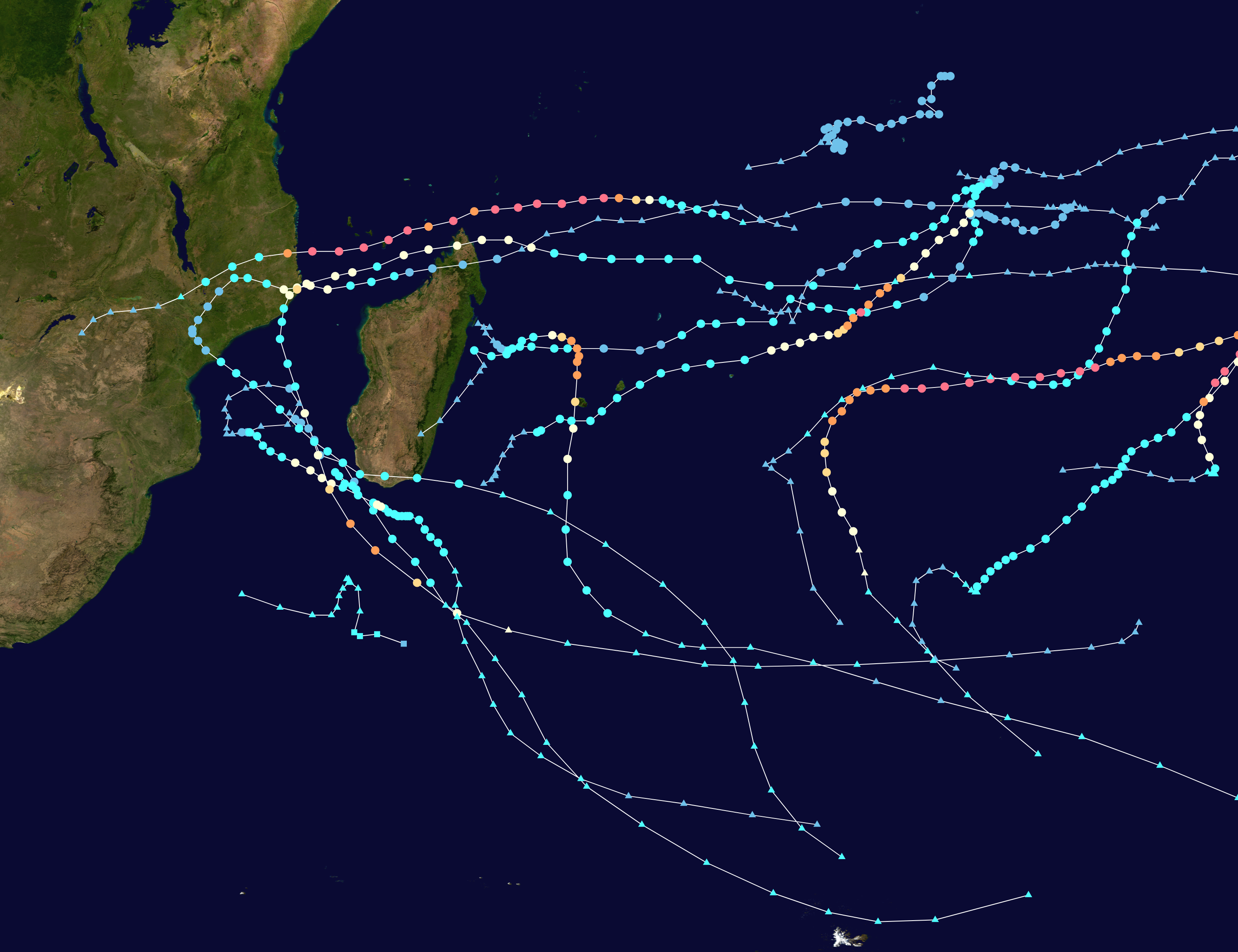
- Season summary map

Seasonal boundaries
- First system formed: 15 August 2024
- Last system dissipated: 21 April 2025

Strongest storm
- Name: Vince
  - Maximum winds: 220 km/h (140 mph) (10-minute sustained)
  - Lowest pressure: 925 hPa (mbar)

Seasonal statistics
- Total disturbances: 15
- Total depressions: 15
- Total storms: 13
- Tropical cyclones: 9
- Intense tropical cyclones: 6
- Very intense tropical cyclones: 1
- Total fatalities: 211 total
- Total damage: > $5.09 billion (2025 USD) (Costliest South-West Indian Ocean cyclone season on record)

Related articles
- 2024–25 Australian region cyclone season; 2024–25 South Pacific cyclone season

The 2024–25 South-West Indian Ocean cyclone season was a very active and extremely destructive South-West Indian Ocean cyclone season that was the costliest on record, surpassing the 2018–19 season, mostly due to Cyclone Chido. It was an above-average season that was tied as the third-most active season in the South-West Indian Ocean since records began in 1967, producing thirteen named storms (three of them crossed from the Australian region), nine tropical cyclones, six intense tropical cyclones, and only one very intense tropical cyclone. The season began on 15 November 2024 and ended on 30 April 2025, with the exception of Mauritius and the Seychelles, for which it ended on 15 May 2025. These dates conventionally delimit the period of each year when most tropical and subtropical cyclones form in the basin, which is west of 90°E and south of the Equator. However, tropical cyclones can form year-round, with any cyclone forming between 1 July 2024 and 30 June 2025, such as 01, Ancha, and Bheki, being part of the season.

The first system formed before the official start of the season, Tropical Depression 01, but the disturbance failed to organize into a tropical storm and dissipated on 17 August. In late September, Tropical Storm Ancha formed without making landfall, and a month later, three days before the official start of the season, Tropical Storm Bheki formed, which became the first intense tropical cyclone of the season a few days later, leaving heavy rains in the Mascarene Islands. In mid-December, Tropical Storm Chido formed and rapidly intensified into a Category 4-equivalent tropical cyclone two days later, then made landfall on Agaléga North Island. Chido then peaked as a Category 5-equivalent cyclone before weakening down to a Category 3 then eventually to a Category 2 northeast of Madagascar. The cyclone then rapidly intensified back to a Category 4 equivalent cyclone and made landfall on Mayotte, becoming the strongest landfalling cyclone in the island on record. Chido went on to strike Mozambique as a powerful Category 4 equivalent cyclone. Dikeledi formed on 6 January, gradually intensifying over the next four days until making landfalling in Northern Madagascar as a Category 2 equivalent cyclone on 11 January. The cyclone weakened to a tropical storm south of Mayotte before rapidly strengthening back to Category 2 intensity, making landfall near Nacala at that strength on 13 January.

In late January, two tropical cyclones formed; one of them was the moderate Tropical Storm Faida, which brought heavy rainfall to Madagascar on 5 February. After Faida dissipated, Tropical Cyclone Vince entered the basin from the Australian region on 4 February. Four days later, it became the most intense cyclone of the season and the first very intense tropical cyclone since Cyclone Freddy two years before. At 12 February, Vince had transitioned to being extratropical. At the same day, Taliah had entered the basin fluctuating between a moderate tropical storm and a strong tropical storm before becoming a post-tropical cyclone at 18 February. Six days later, Garance and Honde had formed, Garance receiving its name the day after. Garance intensified rapidly into an Intense Tropical Cyclone, making landfall at Réunion at 28 February as a Category 2. Honde brought heavy rainfall to Mozambique and then southern Madagascar as a Category 1. Jude formed as a disturbance south of the Chagos Islands on 6 March. It intensified at 8 March, receiving its name. Ivone entered the basin on 8 March and on the same day intensified to a Moderate Tropical Storm and received its name. Jude made landfall in Mozambique as a Category 1 at 10 March. Courtney from the Australian region entered the basin on 29 March, becoming an intense tropical cyclone. After nearly a month of inactivity, the final system, Subtropical Storm Kanto was named on 20 April, reaching a peak intensity of 75 km/h (10 minute sustained) winds with a central pressure of 993 hPa. This was the first subtropical storm to receive such a designation from Meteo France, which introduced the category beginning with this cyclone season. Tropical cyclones during this season collectively caused at least 211 deaths and more than $5 billion in damages.

== Seasonal forecasts ==
Source/Record		Moderate Tropical Storm	Very/Intense Tropical Cyclone
Record high:		2018–19: 15	2018–19: 9
Record low:		1982–83: 3	2010–11: 0
Forecast Center	Systems		
Météo-France	9–13 tropical cyclones		
Mauritius Meteorological Services	11–13 tropical cyclones		
Forecast Center	Chance of below/near/above average		
Météo-France	10%	40%	50%
Source: Seasonal Outlook for Tropical Cyclones.

== Seasonal summary ==
=== Pre-season/early-season activity ===
The season officially started on 15 November 2024; however, the first system, Tropical Depression 01, formed on 15 August, a whole three months before the official start. In late–September, Moderate Tropical Storm Ancha formed on 30 September and dissipated five days later without making landfall. Three days before the official start of the season, Tropical Storm Bheki formed, which days later became the first intense tropical cyclone in the basin. Bheki caused heavy rainfall in parts of the Mascarene Islands such as Réunion and Rodrigues. After the dissipation of Bheki, Tropical Storm Chido formed on 9 December, and two days later became the second intense tropical cyclone of the season. Chido devastated Agaléga, Mayotte, and Mozambique, and caused hundreds of deaths and injuries.

=== Peak season activity ===
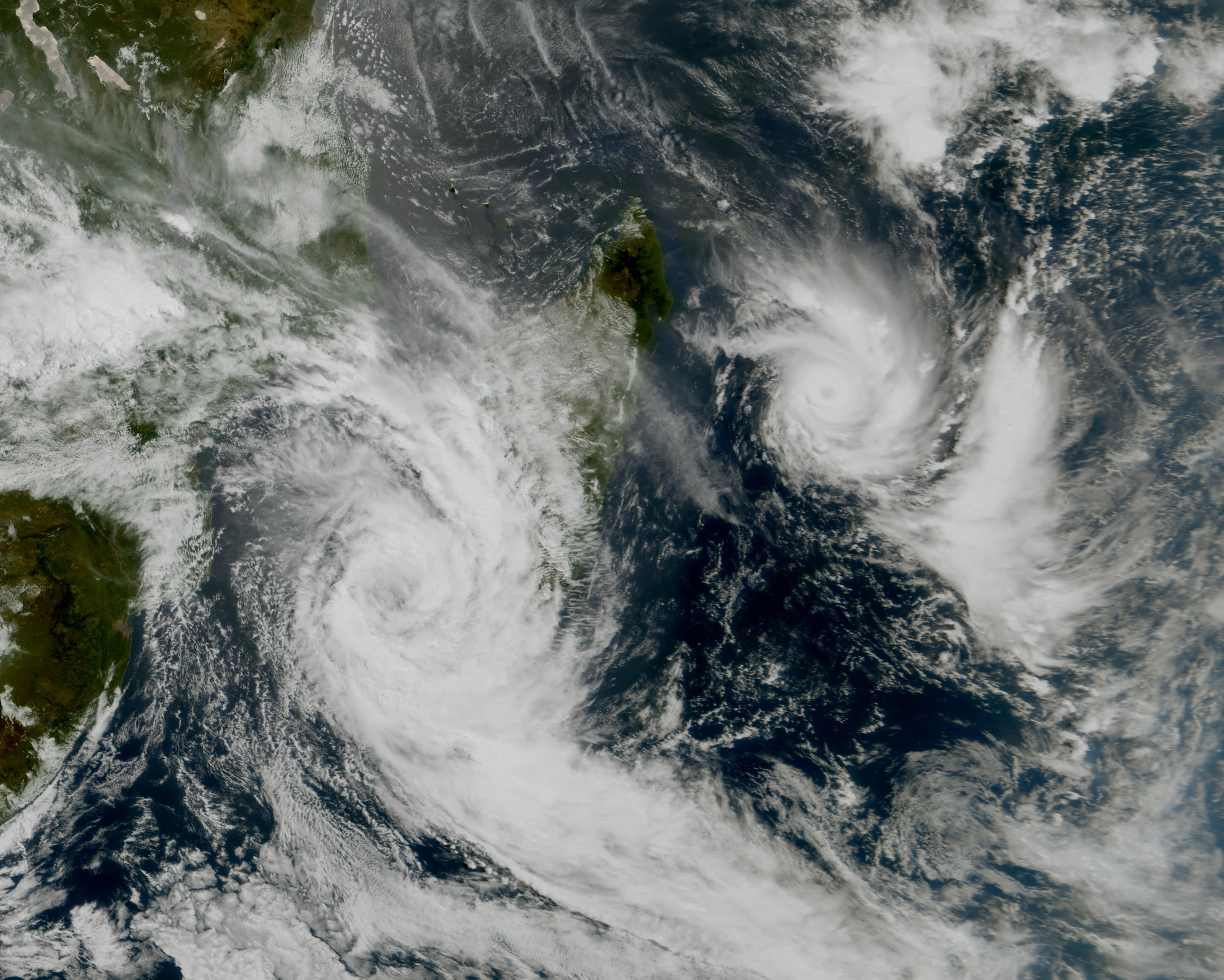
Two systems active on 28 February near Madagascar: Tropical Cyclone Honde (left) and Intense Tropical Cyclone Garance (right).

Cyclone Dikeledi formed near Java, Indonesia on 30 December 2024, and was named on 9 January. It hit Madagascar as a tropical cyclone, then Mozambique, fluctuating in strength. It peaked as an intense tropical cyclone on 16 January, setting a record for its southerly location, before weakening and becoming extratropical on 17 January. In late January, Moderate Tropical Storm Elvis formed in the southern Mozambique Channel where it brought heavy rain to south-western Madagascar specifically in the Toliara Province but also the Morombe District. Soon after on 28 January RSMC La Réunion started to monitor tropical disturbance 07. It strengthened to Tropical Depression 07 the next day and remained that intensity whilst impacting Rodrigues, where a class 2 cyclone warning was issued, and Mauritius where a class 1 was issued. It also effected Réunion's weather before moving away to the west-north-west towards Madagascar, where it eventually strengthened into Moderate Tropical Storm Faida on 2 February. However, in post-storm analysis Faida was downgraded to tropical depression status.

Early on 4 February, Tropical Cyclone Vince moved into the basin, from the Australian Region. Vince would continue to steadily intensify until 6 February, when Vince underwent rapid intensification, and acquired winds of 155 miles per hour, and a minimum central pressure of 924 millibars. Tropical Cyclone Taliah also moved into the basin from the Australian Region on 12 February at tropical cyclone intensity. On 24 February, two tropical cyclones formed near Madagascar, Garance and Honde, one of which became an intense tropical cyclone three days later. On 24 February, two tropical cyclones formed near Madagascar, Garance and Honde. Garance rapidly intensified, reaching intense tropical cyclone status on 27 February, with peak winds of 110 miles per hour and a minimum central pressure of 951 millibars. Honde, a larger and less intense system, gradually strengthened, reaching tropical cyclone status on 28 February, with peak winds of 75 miles per hour and a minimum central pressure of 968 millibars.

=== Late season activity ===
Ivone and Jude formed on 8 March, in the far-eastern South-West Indian Ocean and Mozambique channel, respectively. Ivone reached its peak as a Severe Tropical Storm on 9 March. Ivone turned post-tropical on 11 March. Jude made landfall in Mozambique as a Tropical Cyclone also on 11 March, and dissipated on the same day over Mozambique, but re-emerged as a tropical storm over the Mozambique Channel two days later. On 29 March, Severe Tropical Cyclone Courtney entered in the basin, and later this day it peaked with winds of 125 mph (205 km/h) before weakening far from land. It transitioned into an post-tropical cyclone on 31 March.

After a period of nearly a month with little activity, Meteo France began monitoring a weather system far south of Madagascar that showed potential for subtropical development, and on 20 April, it was classified as a subtropical depression; later that same evening, Madagascar's Meteorological services further upgraded it to a subtropical storm, assigning it the name Kanto, which marked the first subtropical storm named by Meteo France.

== Systems ==
=== Tropical Depression 01 ===
- Tropical depression (MFR)
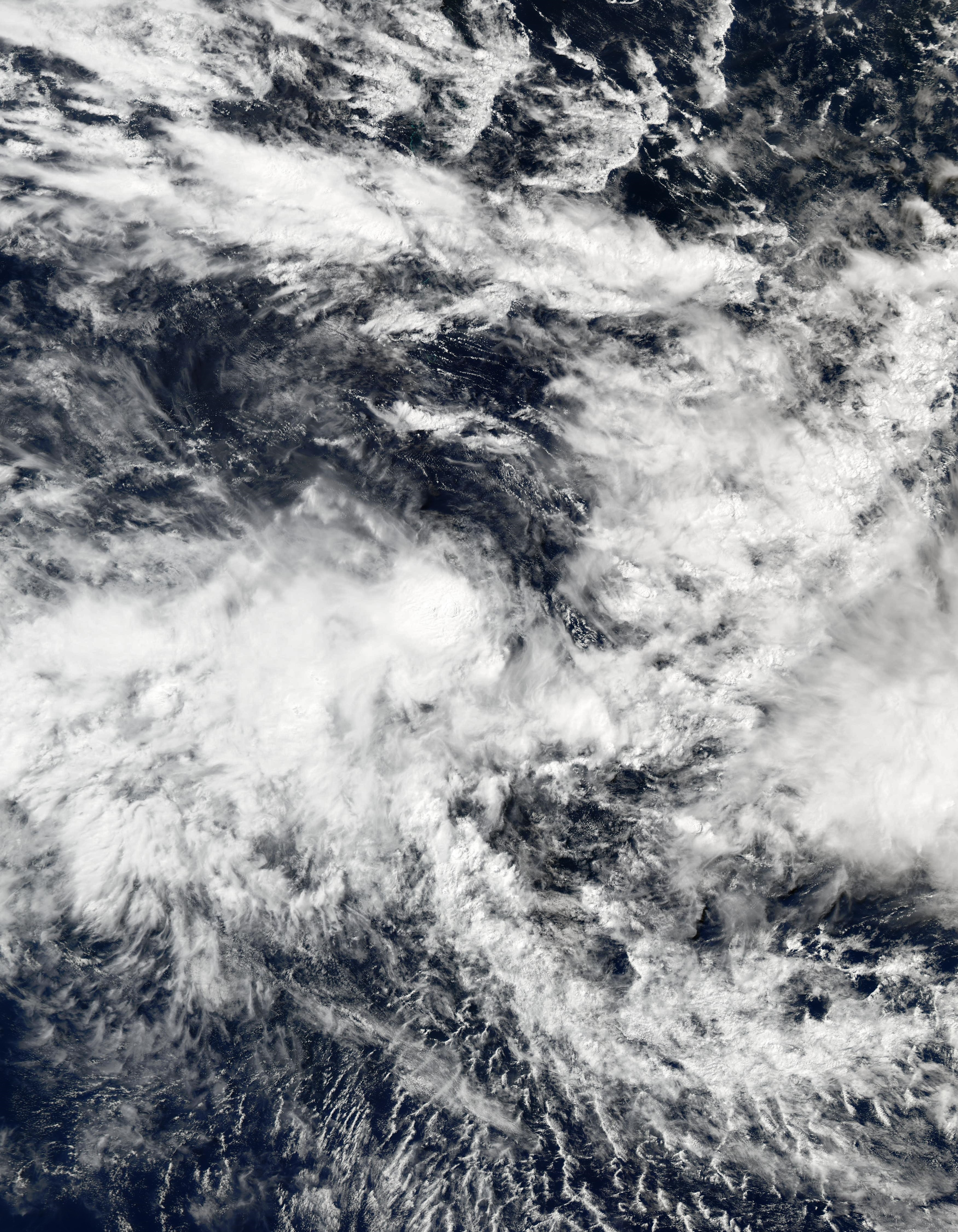
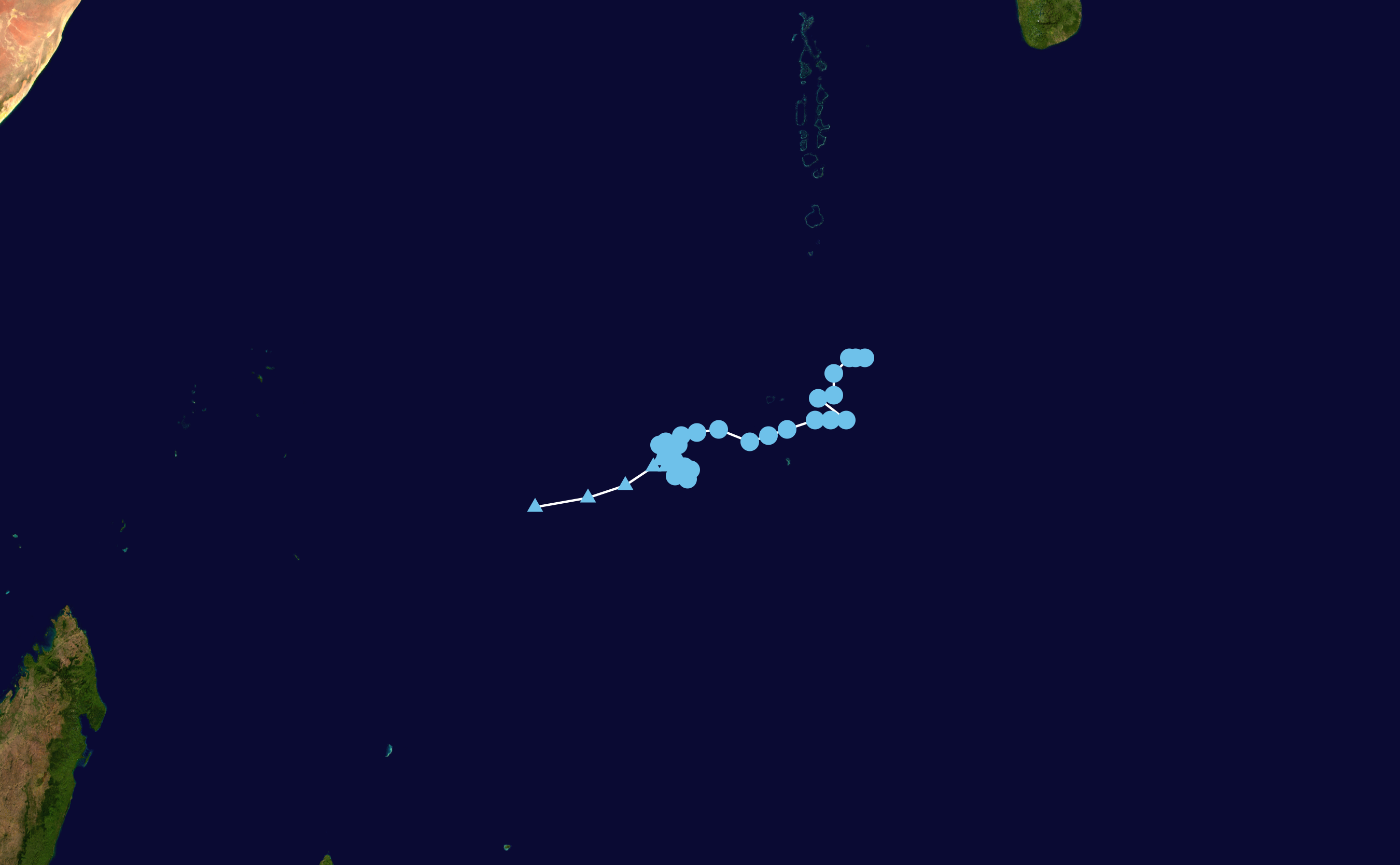
- Duration: 15 August – 17 August
- Peak intensity: 55 km/h (35 mph) (10-min); 1000 hPa (mbar)

On 8 August, the MFR noted that in mid-August, tropical cyclogenesis was possible near the equator due to a westerly wind burst expected to form during the active phase of the Madden–Julian oscillation (MJO). Three days later, a near-equatorial trough formed, with convective activity developing near the trough's axis. Slowly developing, on 13 August, a low-level circulation was seen, with convective bands wrapping around its circulation. Two days later, the Joint Typhoon Warning Center (JTWC) began tracking the disturbance, noting that it was in a marginal environment for development. Just a few hours later, the MFR designated the disturbance as Zone of Disturbed Weather 01. Soon after, the JTWC issued a Tropical Cyclone Formation Alert (TCFA) on the disturbance, noting that despite being in an environment with high wind shear, it was intensifying. Later that day, the disturbance had intensified into a tropical depression. However, it weakened into a zone of disturbed weather, and after its window of development ended on 17 August, the MFR issued their last warning on the system. The JTWC soon cancelled their TCFA on the disturbance, noting that it could still develop. As a result, early the next day, the MFR began re-monitoring the disturbance as it was developing despite being in an unfavorable environment. However, as it entered an increasingly dry and sheared environment on 20 August, it degenerated into a remnant low. The JTWC stopped tracking it later that day, as it had dissipated, with the MFR following suit as well.

=== Severe Tropical Storm Ancha ===
- Severe tropical storm (MFR)
- Tropical storm (SSHWS)
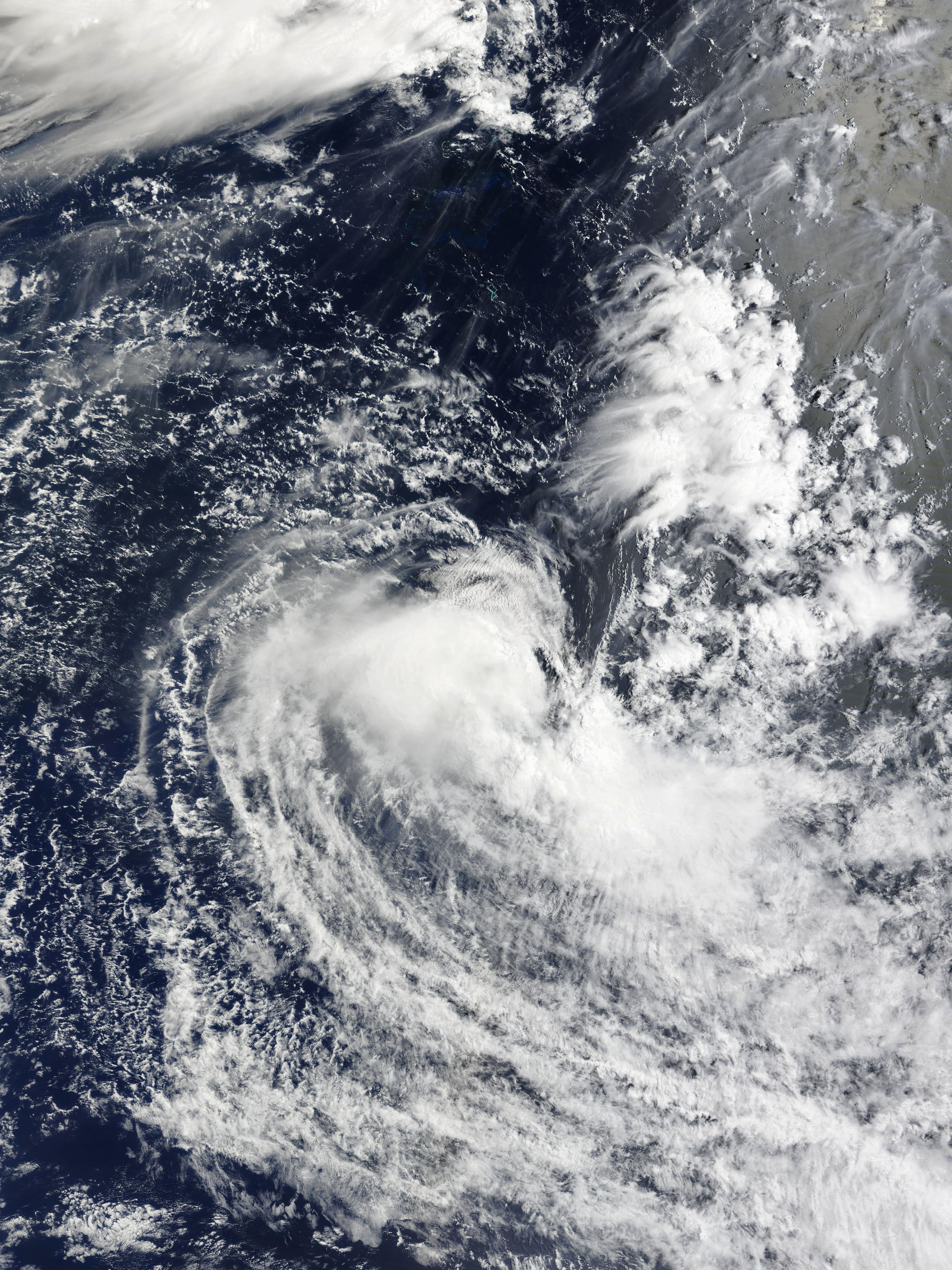
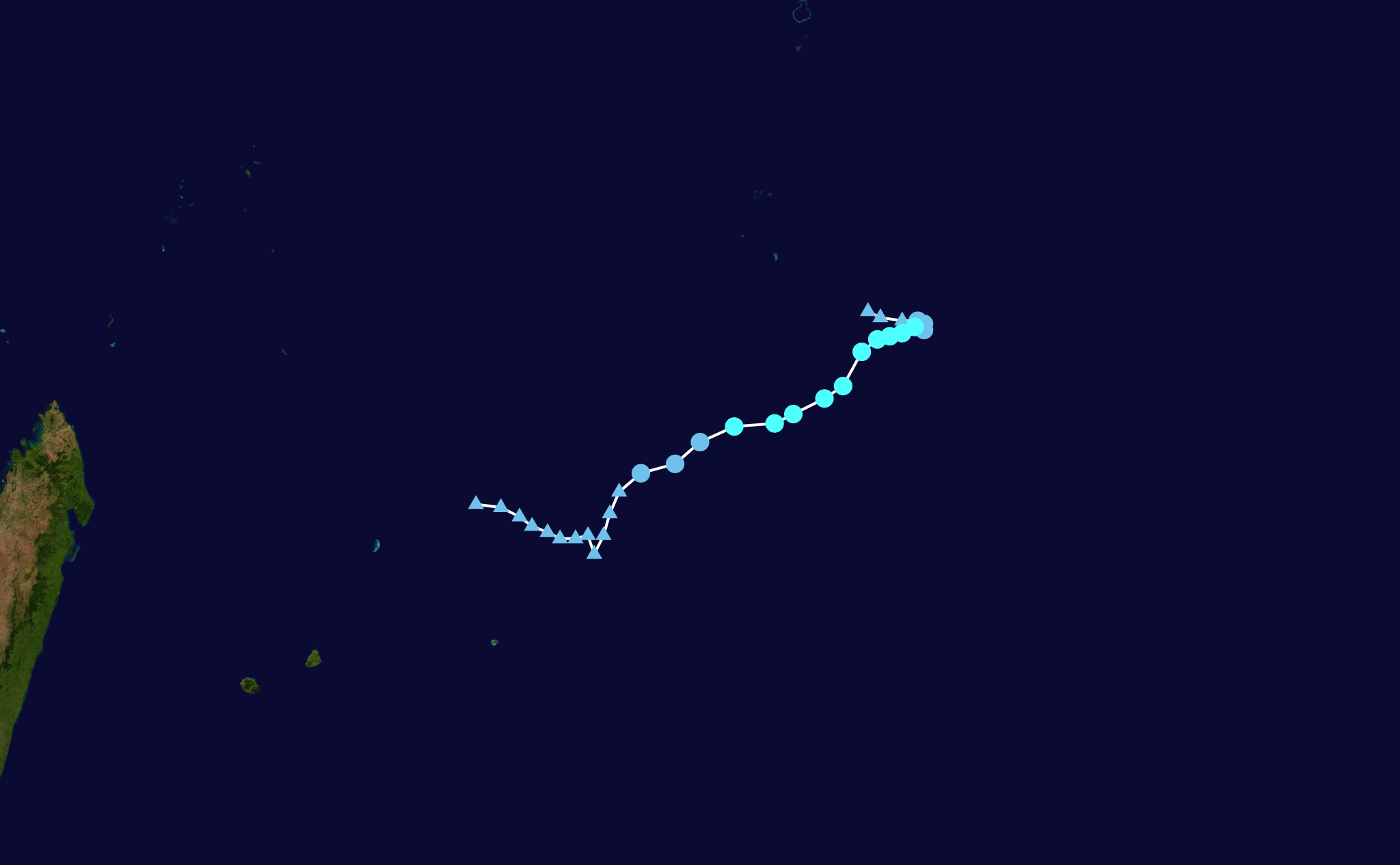
- Duration: 30 September – 5 October
- Peak intensity: 95 km/h (60 mph) (10-min); 992 hPa (mbar)

On 24 September, the MFR noted that tropical cyclogenesis would be possible in late September due to the passage of an equatorial Rossby wave and a Kelvin wave, which would help cause the formation of a temporary near-equatorial trough. The next day, a near-equatorial trough would begin forming, featuring moderate convective activity on its polar side. The JTWC would begin tracking the disturbance late on 30 September, noting that it was in an environment marginally favorable for development east-southeast off Diego Garcia. The next day, the MFR upgraded this system into a tropical depression. The JTWC would upgrade it into Tropical Cyclone 01S later that day, with the MFR following suit the next day, upgrading the depression into Moderate Tropical Storm Ancha. A few hours later, it peaked with 1-minute sustained winds of 60 mph (95 km/h). Ancha's cloud pattern would improve on 2 October, causing it to peak as a high-end moderate tropical storm with 10-minute sustained winds of 50 mph (85 km/h). However, the next day, Ancha's low-level circulation began being exposed due to moderate wind shear, extensive dry air, and steadily cooling sea surface temperatures, prompting the JTWC to issue their last warning on it. This caused Ancha to recurve westward due to the subtropical ridge prior to degenerating into a remnant low a few hours later. However, for a short time it regenerated into a moderate tropical storm. Later, increasing tropospheric shear caused this temporary regeneration to end, and the MFR would stop monitoring it on 4 October.

=== Intense Tropical Cyclone Bheki ===
- Intense tropical cyclone (MFR)
- Category 4 tropical cyclone (SSHWS)
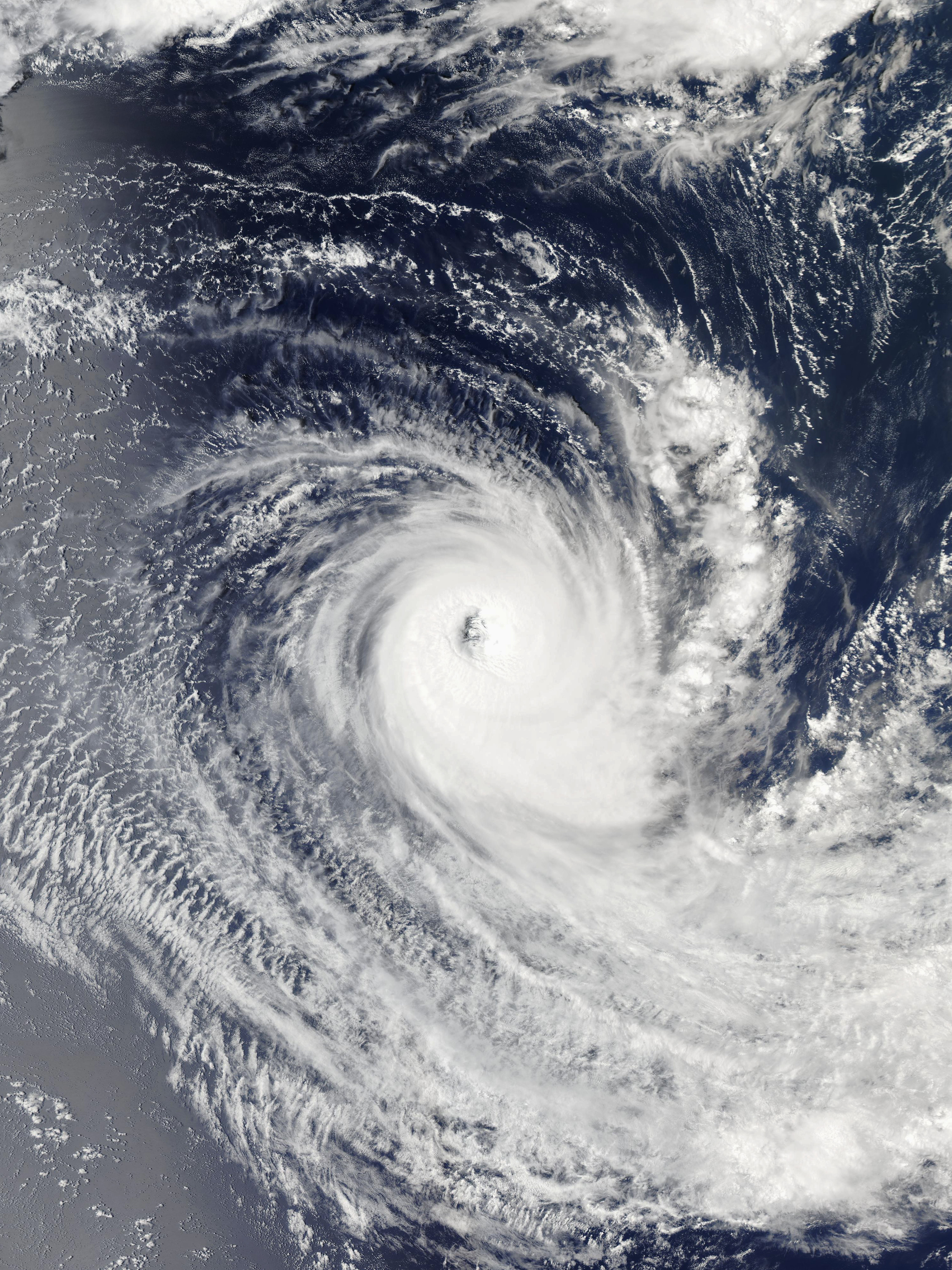
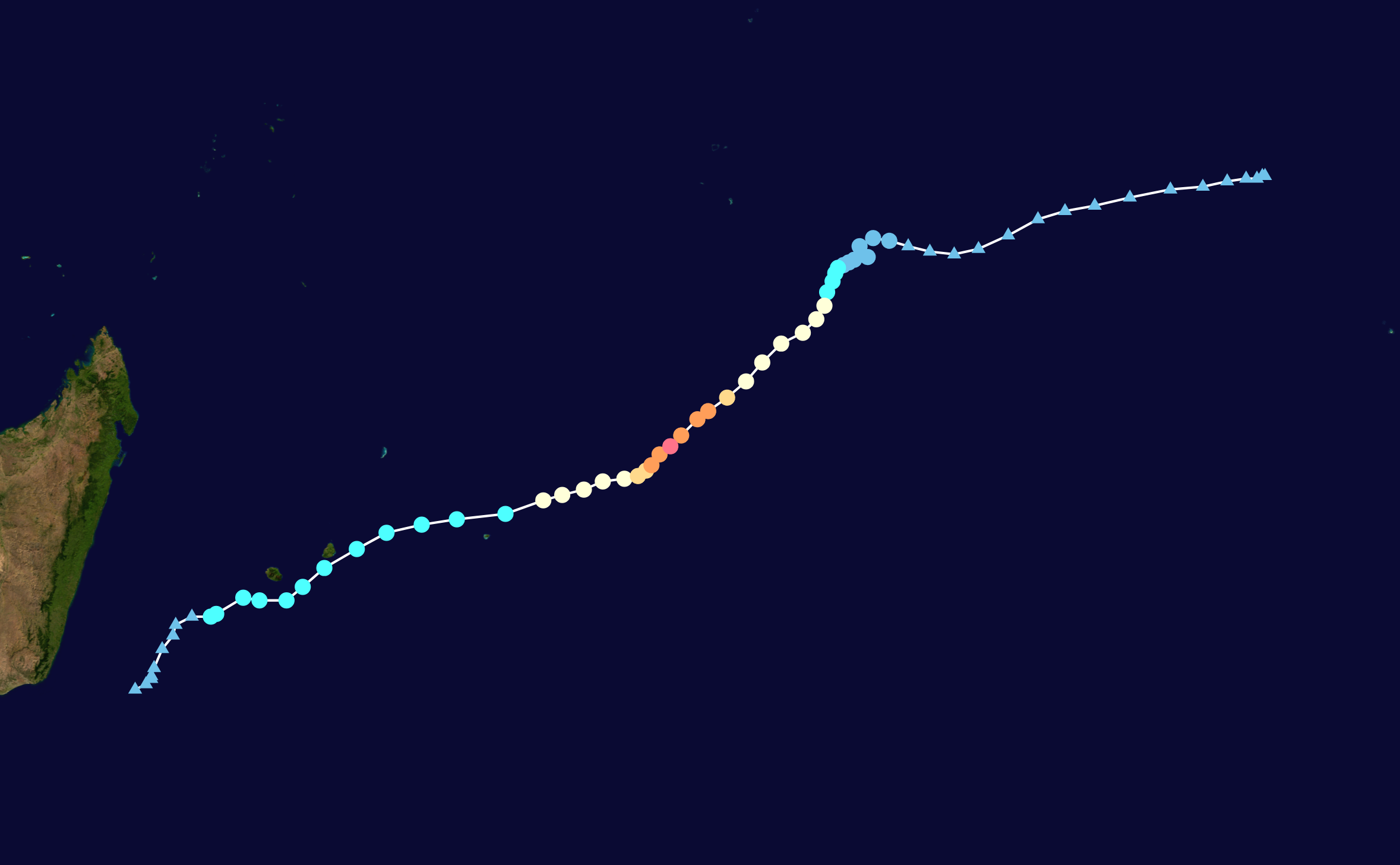
- Duration: 12 November – 23 November
- Peak intensity: 185 km/h (115 mph) (10-min); 948 hPa (mbar)

On 11 November, the MFR noted that an elongated low-level circulation was developing despite being inside an environment with dry air and easterly shear, due to good divergence on the western side, steadily developing convection, and monsoonal flow. Later that day, the JTWC began tracking the disturbance, noting that it was in an environment favorable for development southeast off Diego Garcia. Further organization occurred, and early on 12 November, the MFR designated the system as Zone of Disturbed Weather 03. Following convection beginning to surround the system's circulation, the MFR upgraded it to Moderate Tropical Storm Bheki on 14 November, with the JTWC designating it Tropical Cyclone 02S a few hours later. A developing central dense overcast and improving cloud pattern prompted the MFR to upgrade Bheki into a severe tropical storm early the next day. Bheki strengthened rapidly and peaked as an Intense Tropical Cyclone on 18 November, becoming the strongest November tropical cyclone on record in the basin based on sustained wind speeds. It was also the third-strongest November tropical cyclone in the basin based on minimum central pressure. Afterwards, the cyclone began to weaken, and on 23 November, it dissipated near Madagascar.

In Rodrigues, Mauritius, wind gusts of 100 to 122 km/h (62 to 76 mph) were reported. The Rodrigues Emergency Operations Command reported that 64% of the population had been left without electricity due to power outages caused by strong winds. Some 50 people had to seek shelter in centres across the island, some rescued by emergency services. Electricity company teams, military personnel and firefighters were dispersed across the territory to carry out necessary work, as well as clearing roads of fallen trees and branches, in order to return the situation to normal. The strong 5 to 7 m (16 to 23 ft) swell caused coastal flooding and in Montagne-Goyave, the community school suffered heavy damage.

=== Intense Tropical Cyclone Chido ===
- Intense tropical cyclone (MFR)
- Category 5 tropical cyclone (SSHWS)
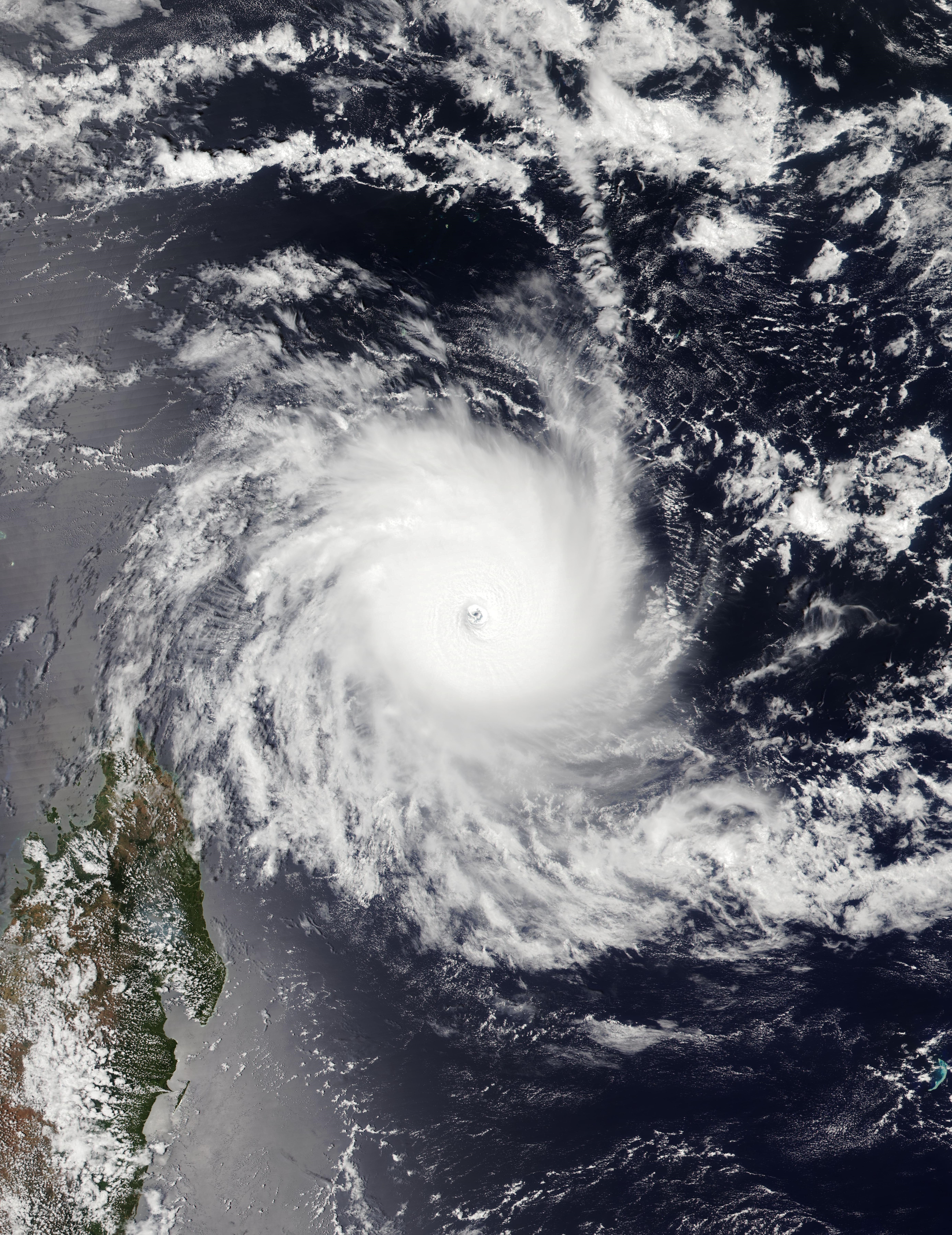
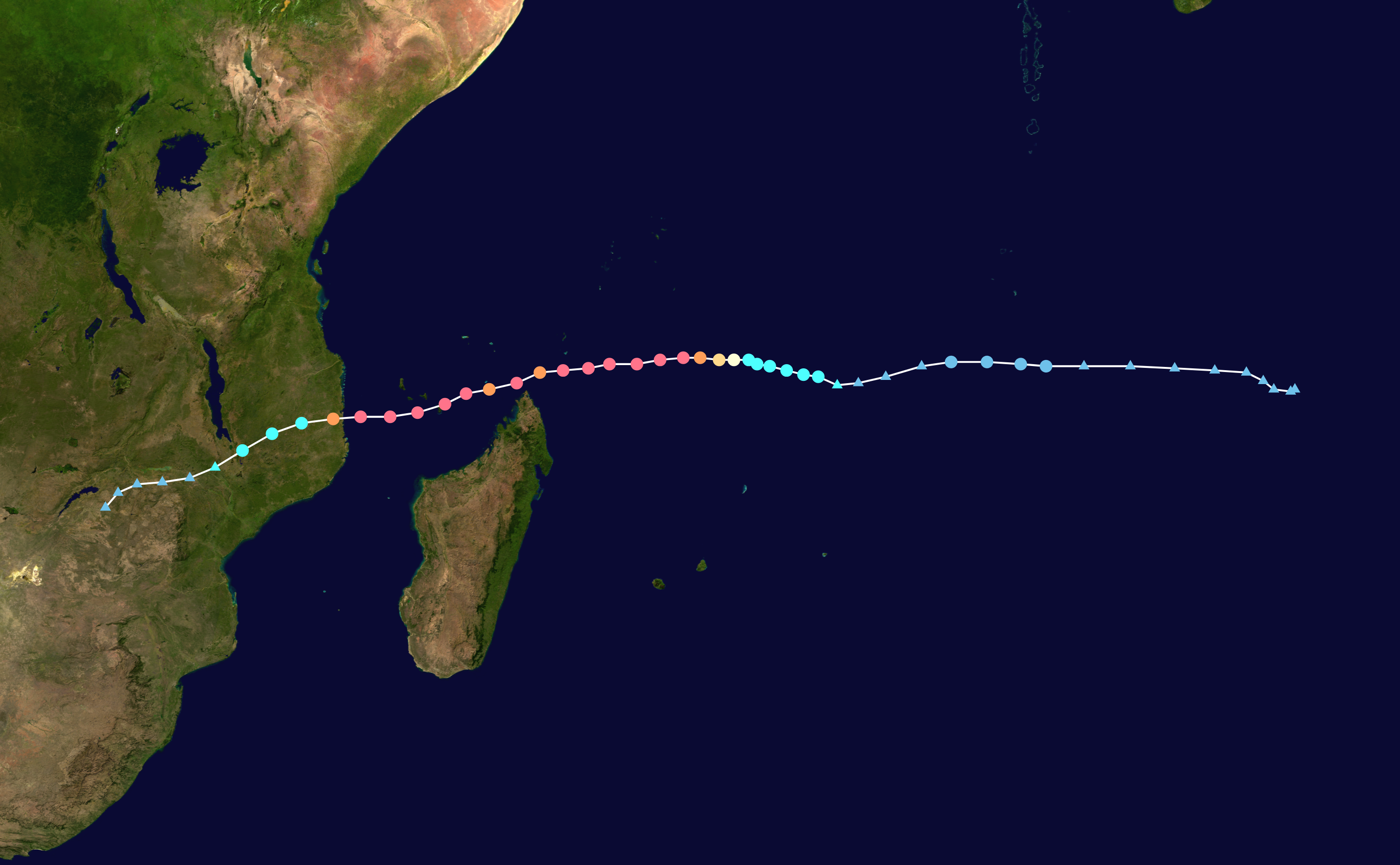
- Duration: 5 December – 16 December
- Peak intensity: 215 km/h (130 mph) (10-min); 935 hPa (mbar)

Chido originated from an elongated circulation that the MFR began monitoring on 7 December, located east of Diego Garcia. In the post-storm analysis, it was indicated that the storm had already begun forming as a zone of disturbed weather on 5 December. On 9 December, the JTWC began issuing warnings for the system, classifying it as Tropical Cyclone 04S, as satellite imagery showed a partially exposed low-level circulation center on the eastern side of a developing burst of deep convection, which was nearly circular in shape and had cloud tops cooler than −80 °C (−112 °F). At 00:00 UTC on 10 December, the MFR reported that the system had intensified into a moderate tropical storm, with the Mauritius Meteorological Services naming it Chido, as convection strongly increased around the center of the system, accompanied by cooling of cloud tops and an expansion of the central dense overcast. On the subsequent day, Chido rapidly deepened and intensified into an intense tropical cyclone within twelve hours, with its eye passing over Agalega and bringing extreme conditions to the island, where a minimum pressure of 980 hPa (28.94 inHg) was recorded. This made Chido the strongest tropical cyclone to directly affect the island since Cyclone Andry in 1983.

On 12 December, the JTWC upgraded the system to a Category 4-equivalent tropical cyclone, with estimated 1-minute maximum sustained winds of 250 km/h (155 mph), while the MFR estimated its peak intensity with a minimum central pressure of 935 hPa (27.61 inHg) and 10-minute maximum sustained winds of 215 km/h (130 mph) as it maintained its small size and moved westwards. After reaching its peak intensity, the cyclone's eye, which was 13.8 miles (22.2 km) wide, became cloud-filled and increasingly ragged, and on 13 December, an eyewall replacement cycle occurred, causing the storm to weaken. Chido entered the Mozambique Channel on 14 December, with microwave imagery showing highly developed organized bands of deep convection. As it neared Mayotte, it quickly re-intensified, with Pamandzi Airport recording a maximum gust of 226 km/h (140 mph), setting an all-time record for the station, and a minimum pressure of 982 hPa (29.00 inHg), breaking the previous record of 985 hPa (29.09 inHg) set during Cyclone Kamisy in 1984. Additionally, the MFR reported that it was the strongest storm to strike Mayotte in at least 90 years. Chido made landfall on Pemba in Mozambique, with 10-minute sustained winds estimated at 205 km/h (125 mph). Shortly after landfall, the JTWC discontinued warnings, and the MFR reported that Chido moved through Mozambique and Malawi, with convective activity gradually weakening. On 16 December, Chido degenerated into an overland depression, and the MFR issued its final advisory on the system.

=== Intense Tropical Cyclone Dikeledi ===
- Intense tropical cyclone (MFR)
- Category 3 tropical cyclone (SSHWS)
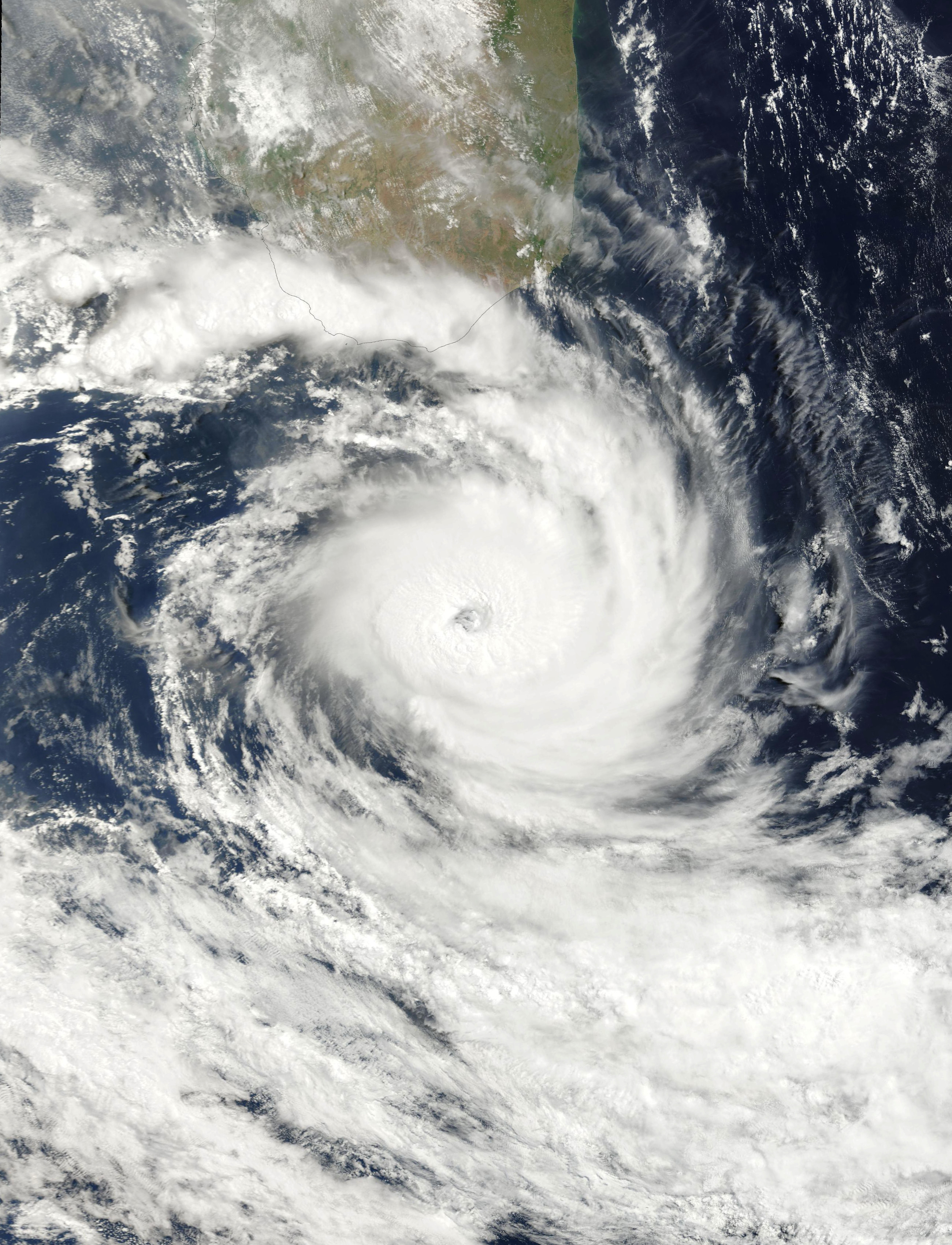
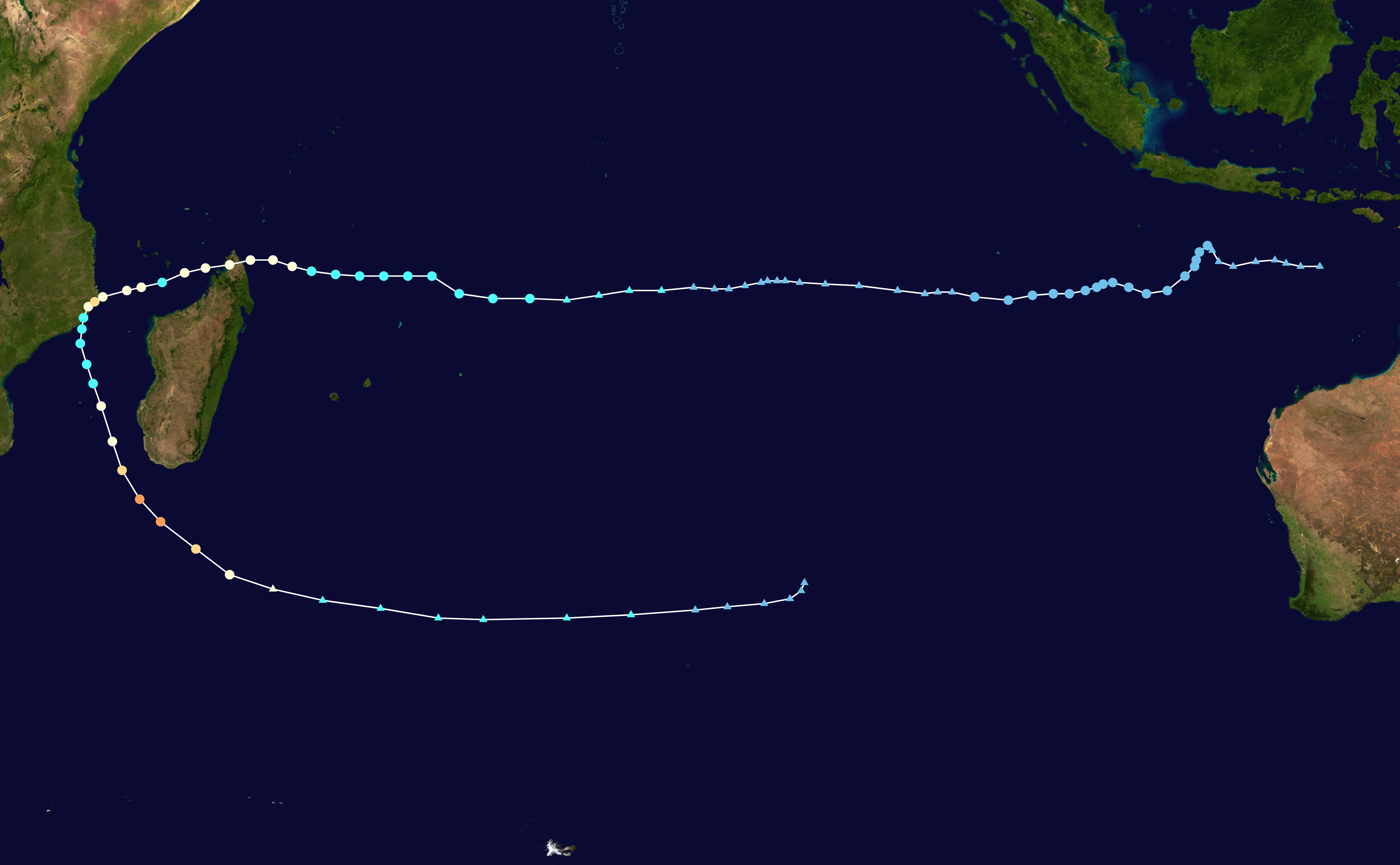
- Duration: 6 January (Entered basin) – 17 January
- Peak intensity: 175 km/h (110 mph) (10-min); 947 hPa (mbar)

Tropical Low 08U entered the RSMC La Reunion area of responsibility late on 4 January. Steered westward by a ridge to its south, the low had poorly organized convection at first, and the MFR designated it Zone of Disturbed Weather 5 on 6 January. Despite dry air and wind shear, the circulation and thunderstorms organized enough for the system to be classified a tropical depression on 8 January. On 9 January, Meteo-France upgraded the depression to Moderate Tropical Storm Dikeledi, after an increase in thunderstorms and a decrease in dry air. Meanwhile, the JTWC issued a series of TCFA's. An eye developed in the center of the convection, and the MFR upgraded Dikeledi to tropical cyclone status late on 10 January. Around 16:30 UTC on 11 January, the cyclone made landfall in northern Madagascar between Antsiranana and Vohemar, with estimated sustained winds of 130 km/h (80 mph). Afterward, Dikeledi weakened back to tropical storm status while over land, emerging into the Mozambique Channel near Nosy-Be. While approaching the coast of Mozambique, the storm reattained tropical cyclone status on 13 January, making landfall in Nampula Province shortly thereafter. Curving southward, the cyclone weakened to tropical storm status over land, but soon reemerged into the Mozambique Channel. Accelerating to the southeast, Dikeledi strengthened back to tropical cyclone intensity on 15 January, due to warm waters and favorable conditions. Passing southwest of southern Madagascar, it strengthened further into an intense tropical cyclone on 16 January, with peak sustained winds of 175 km/h (110 mph); Dikeledi broke the record for the most southerly cyclone of that intensity in the basin, surpassing that of Cyclone Anggrek in 2024. Later that day, stronger wind shear caused the cyclone to rapidly weaken, and the storm transitioned into an extratropical cyclone on 17 January.

Dikeledi made landfall near Antsiranana at Category 2 intensity, resulting in 3 fatalities. The cyclone slightly weakened before intensifying back to Category 2 strength and made landfall near Nacala, Mozambique, causing six fatalities. Estimates from Gallagher Re place losses at US$20 million.

=== Moderate Tropical Storm Elvis ===
- Moderate tropical storm (MFR)
- Tropical storm (SSHWS)
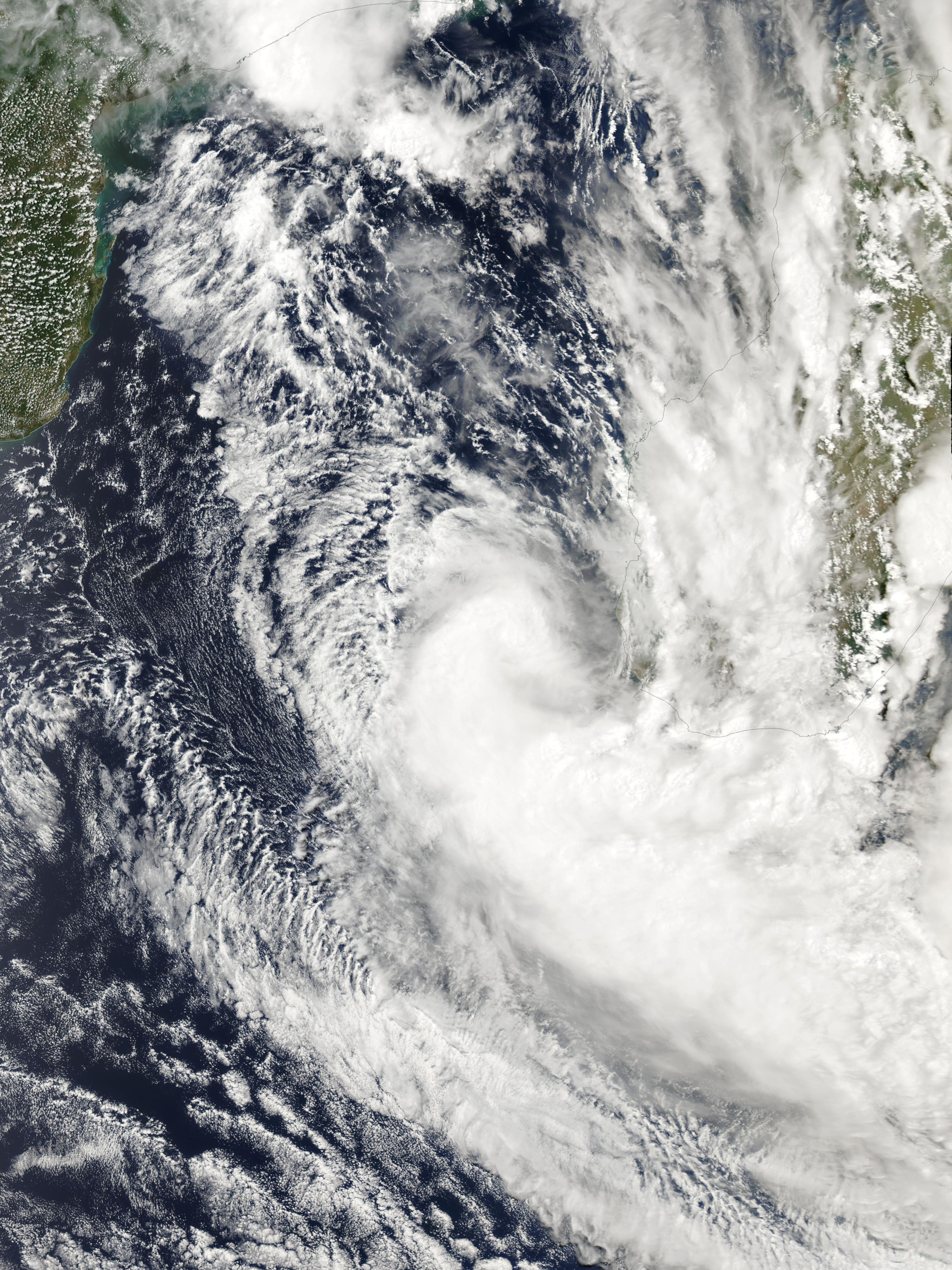
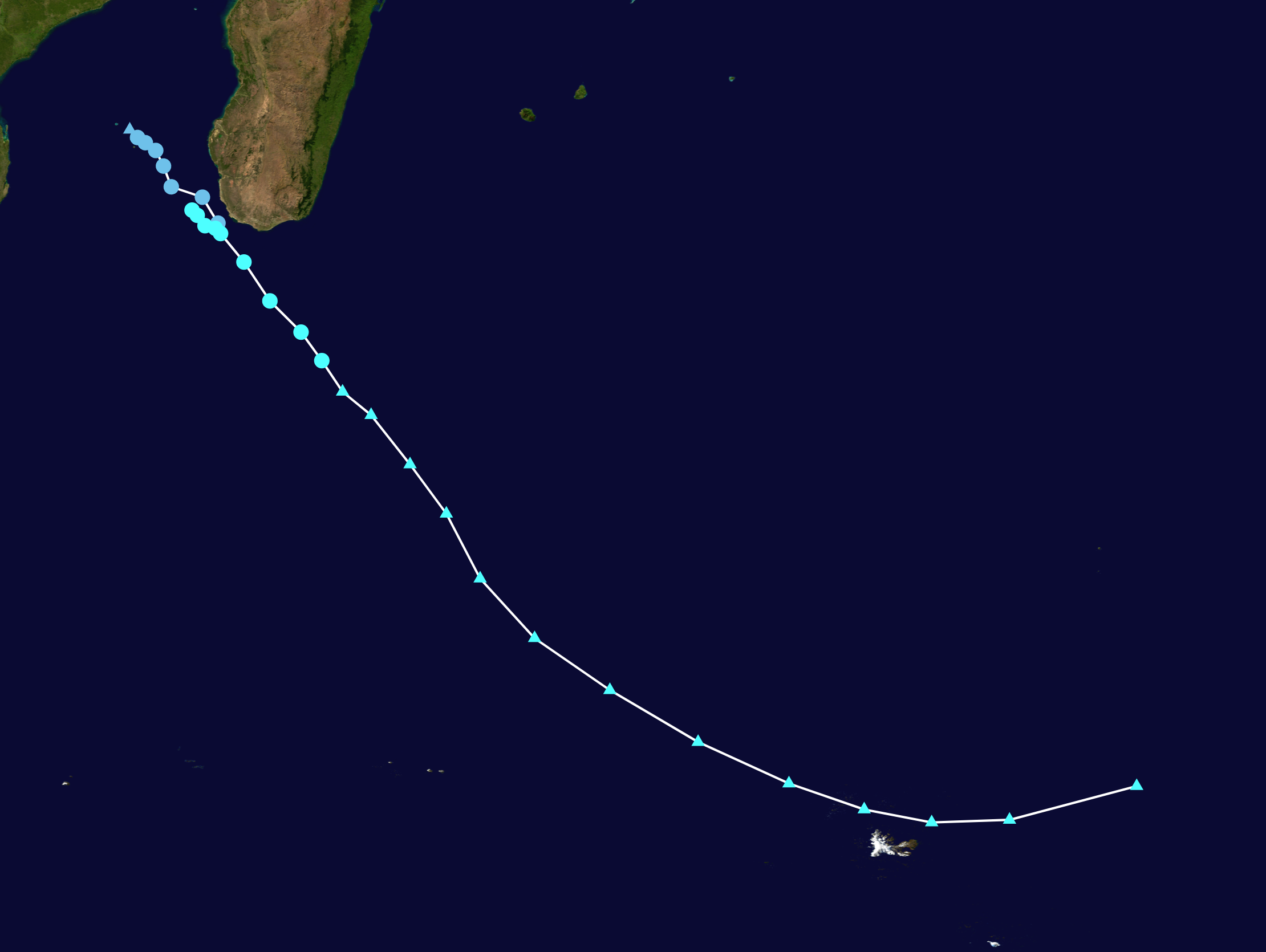
- Duration: 27 January – 31 January
- Peak intensity: 85 km/h (50 mph) (10-min); 989 hPa (mbar)

The monsoon trough feeding the tropical system caused very strong rain bands over the Toliara Province with local accumulations of more than 500 millimetres (20 in) in 24 hours in the Morombe District. Flooding of neighborhoods was reported on 27 January and in Toliara, the water reached up to the knees. In the Betioky-Atsimo (district), in the commune of Tameantsoa, approximately three hundred huts were flooded or swept away by the waters, according to the authorities. Water and electricity were cut off according to the Jirama company.

=== Tropical Depression Faida ===
- Tropical depression (MFR)
- Tropical storm (SSHWS)
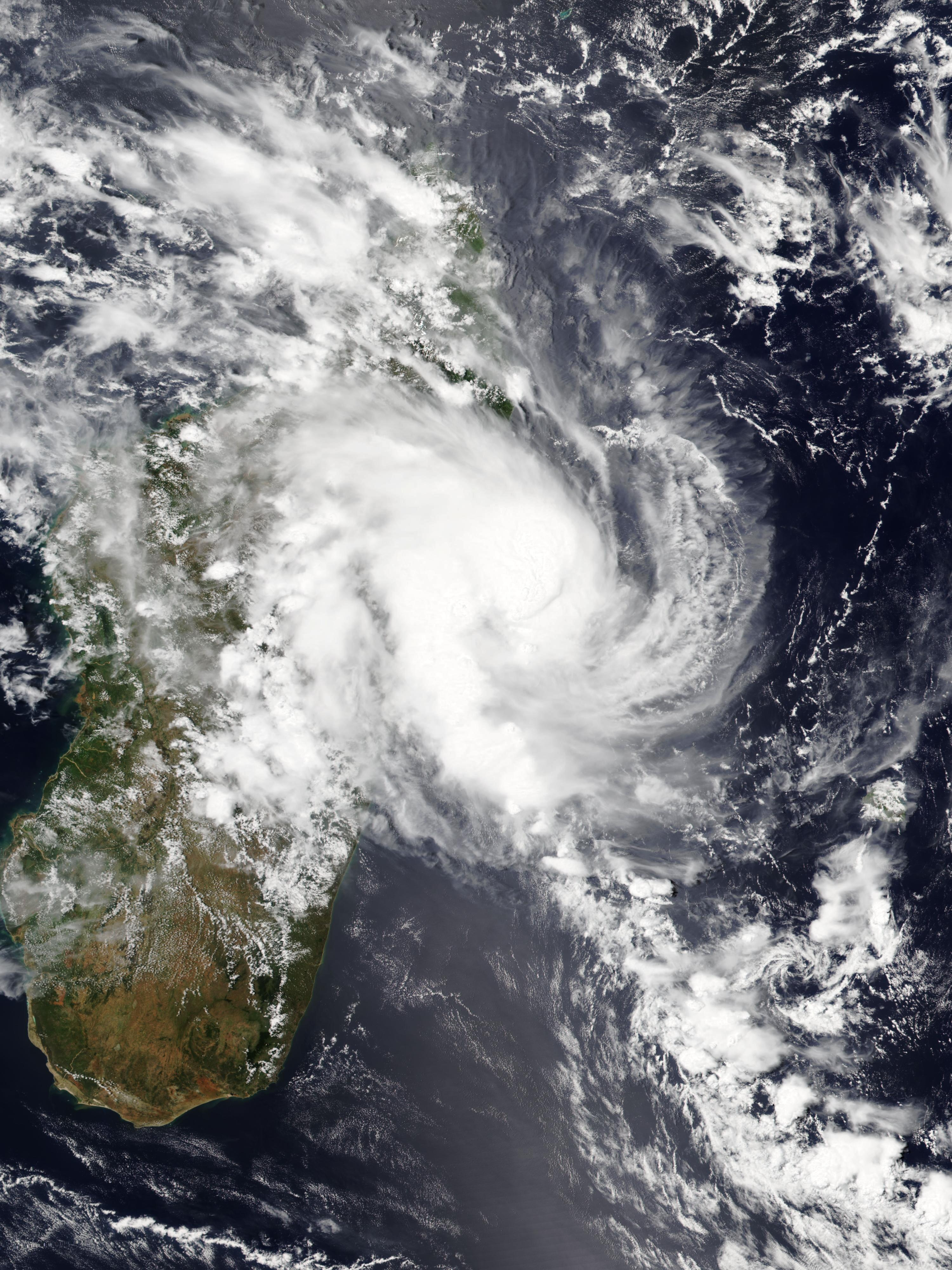
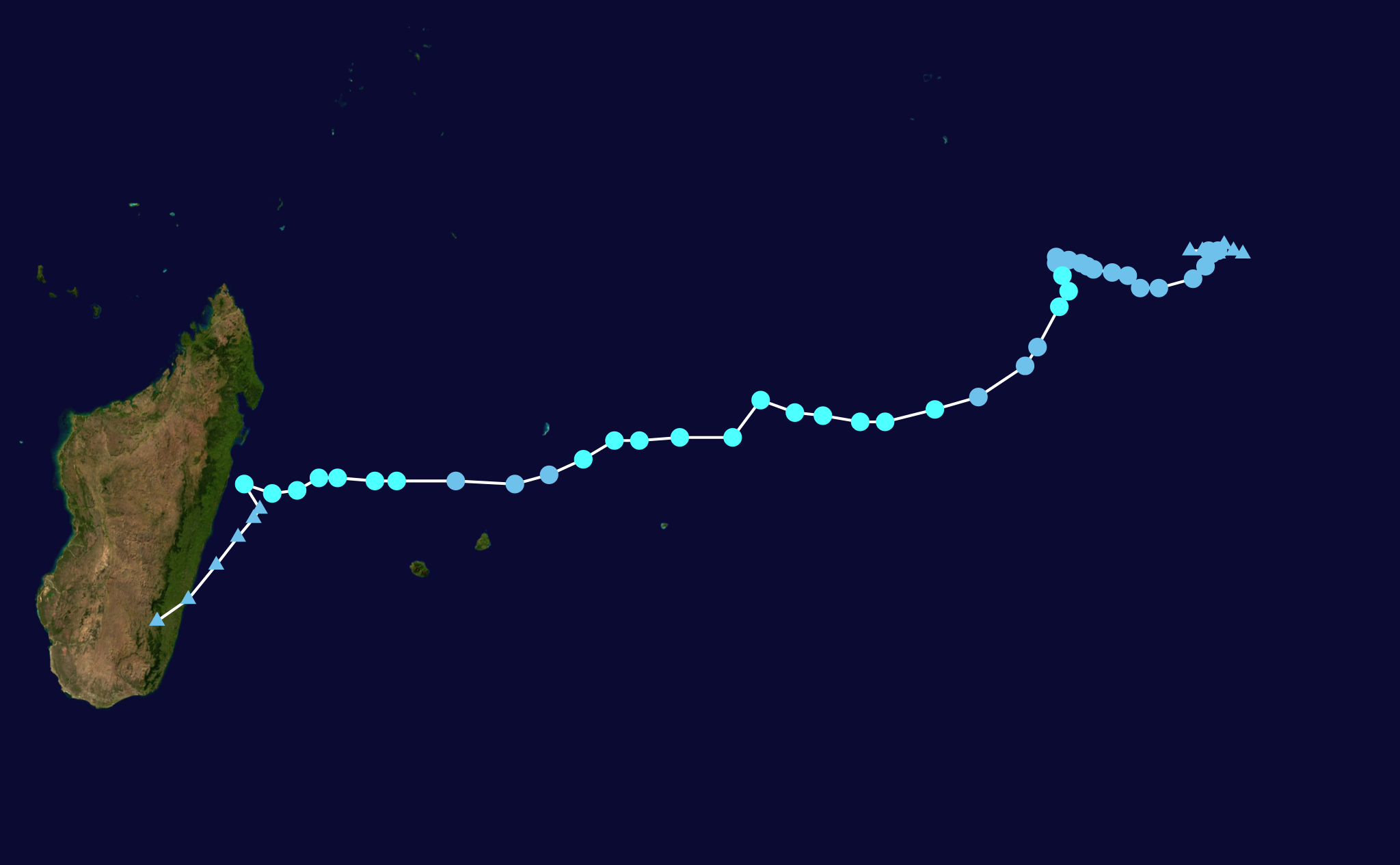
- Duration: 28 January – 4 February
- Peak intensity: 55 km/h (35 mph) (10-min); 997 hPa (mbar)

The MFR upgraded Tropical Depression 06 into Tropical Storm Faida on 28 February.

According to Météo-France, there was generally 30 to 50 mm of rain in the north and east of Réunion Island, with higher totals on the mountain slopes reaching 100 to 150 mm and, locally, up to 180 mm in Brûlé, south of Saint-Denis. These quantities were not enough to compensate for the rainfall deficit of almost 80% on average on the island over the previous two months. In Madagascar, heavy rains have caused damage in several districts. The district of Toamasina I and the city of Fénérive Est are among the most affected areas according to the National Office for Risk and Disaster Management, with 365 people affected and 93 homes flooded. Authorities have opened six shelters to accommodate the displaced.

The post analysis data showed that the MFR had downgraded Faida into a depression.

=== Very Intense Tropical Cyclone Vince ===
- Very intense tropical cyclone (MFR)
- Category 5 tropical cyclone (SSHWS)
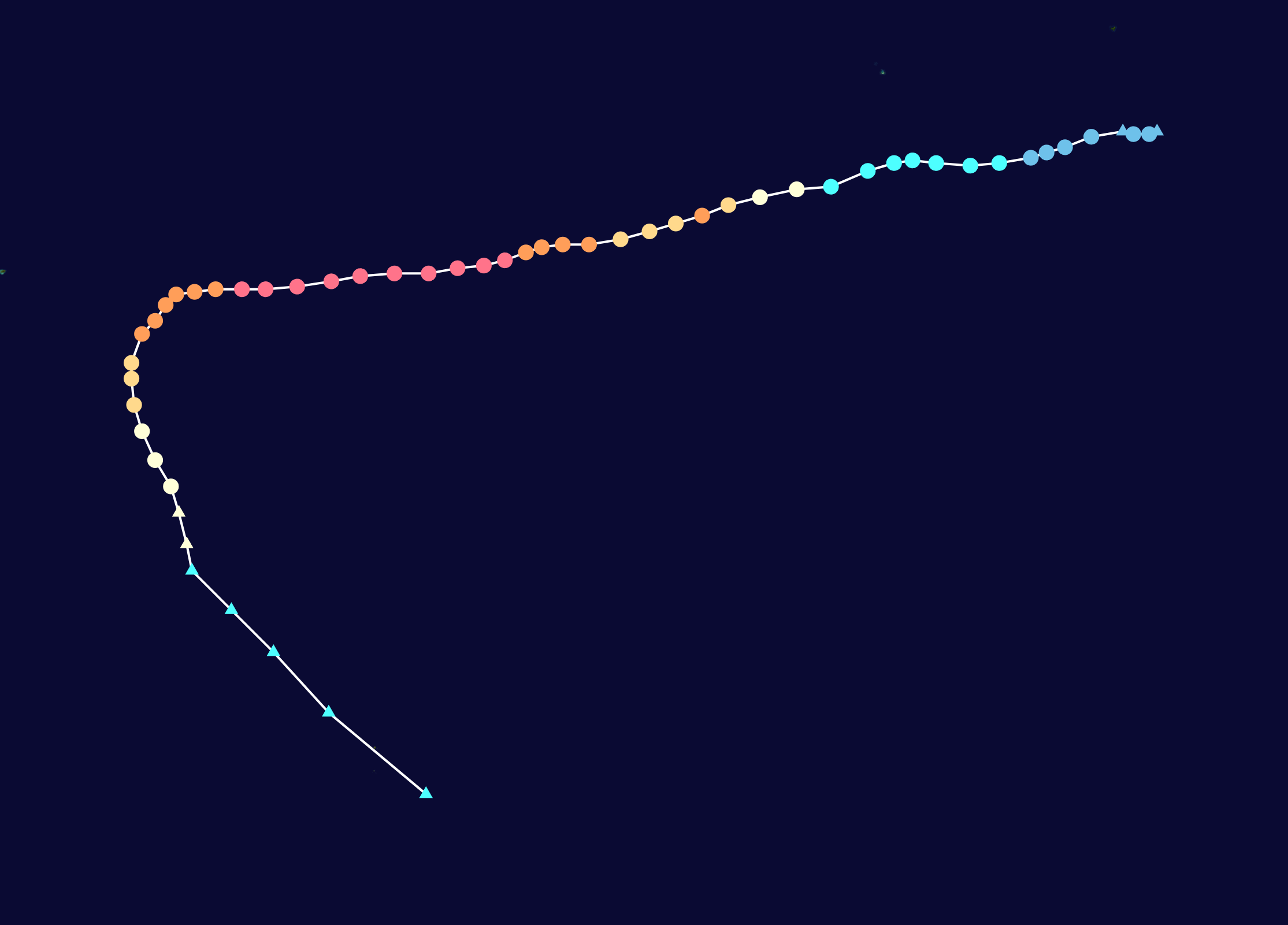
- Duration: 4 February (Entered basin) – 11 February
- Peak intensity: 220 km/h (140 mph) (10-min); 925 hPa (mbar)

On 4 February, Severe Tropical Cyclone Vince entered the South-West Indian Ocean basin from the Australian Region. Vince would continue to steadily intensify until the 6 February, when Vince underwent rapid intensification, and acquired 10-minute sustained winds of 130 mph (210 km/h), and a minimum central pressure of 930 millibars late on 6 February. The storm fluctuated in intensity until where at 06:00 UTC of 7 February it resumed strengthening. Later that day Vince would be upgraded to a Very Intense Tropical Cyclone. On 12:00 UTC, 7 February, Vince reached its peak intensity of 140 mph (225 km/h) and a minimum central pressure of 925 millibars. However, despite rapid intensification, Vince began to weaken, and late on 7 February, Vince had weakened to an Intense Tropical Cyclone. On 11 February, the system became non-tropical on its transition to becoming extratropical.

=== Severe Tropical Storm Taliah ===
- Severe tropical storm (MFR)
- Category 1 tropical cyclone (SSHWS)
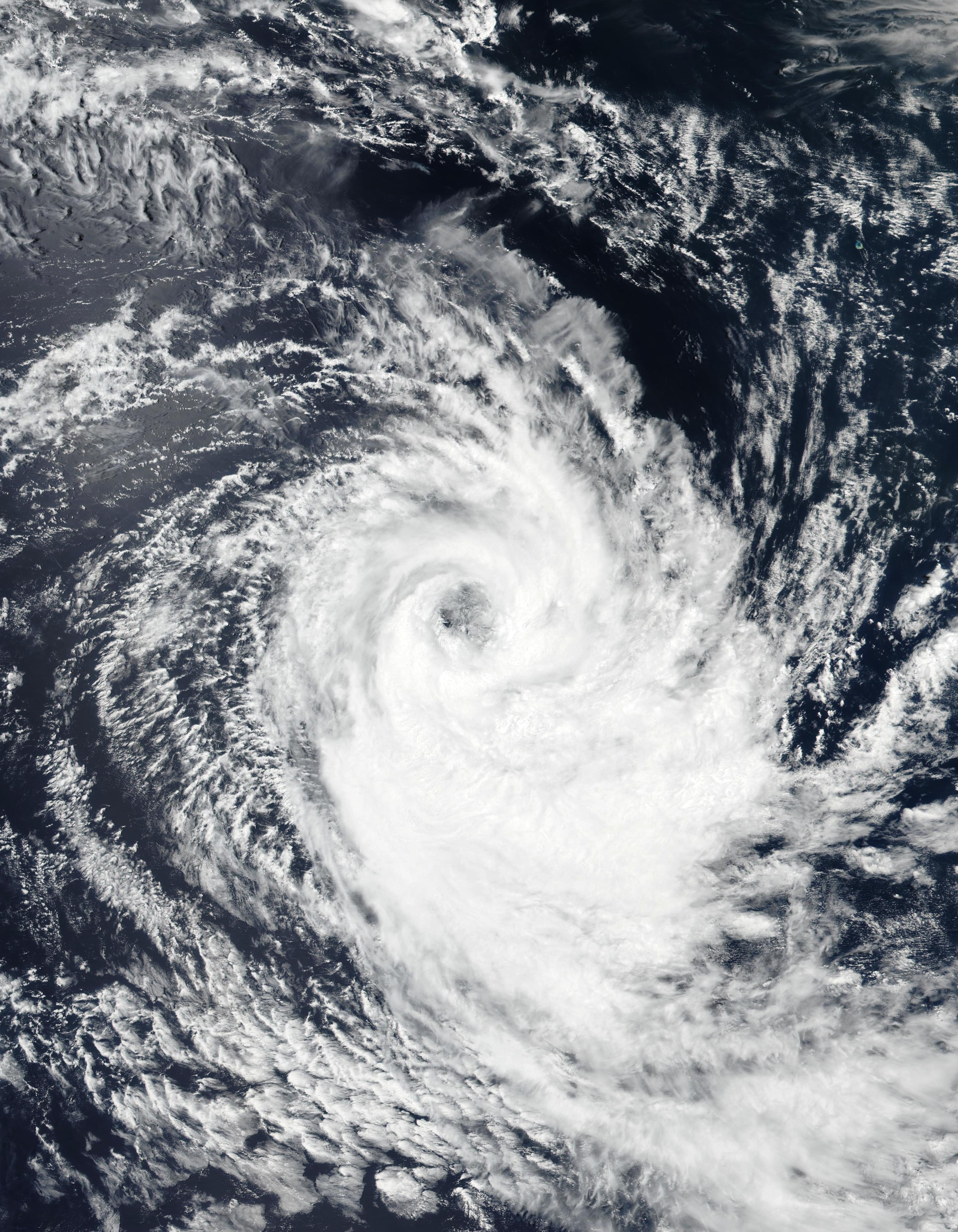
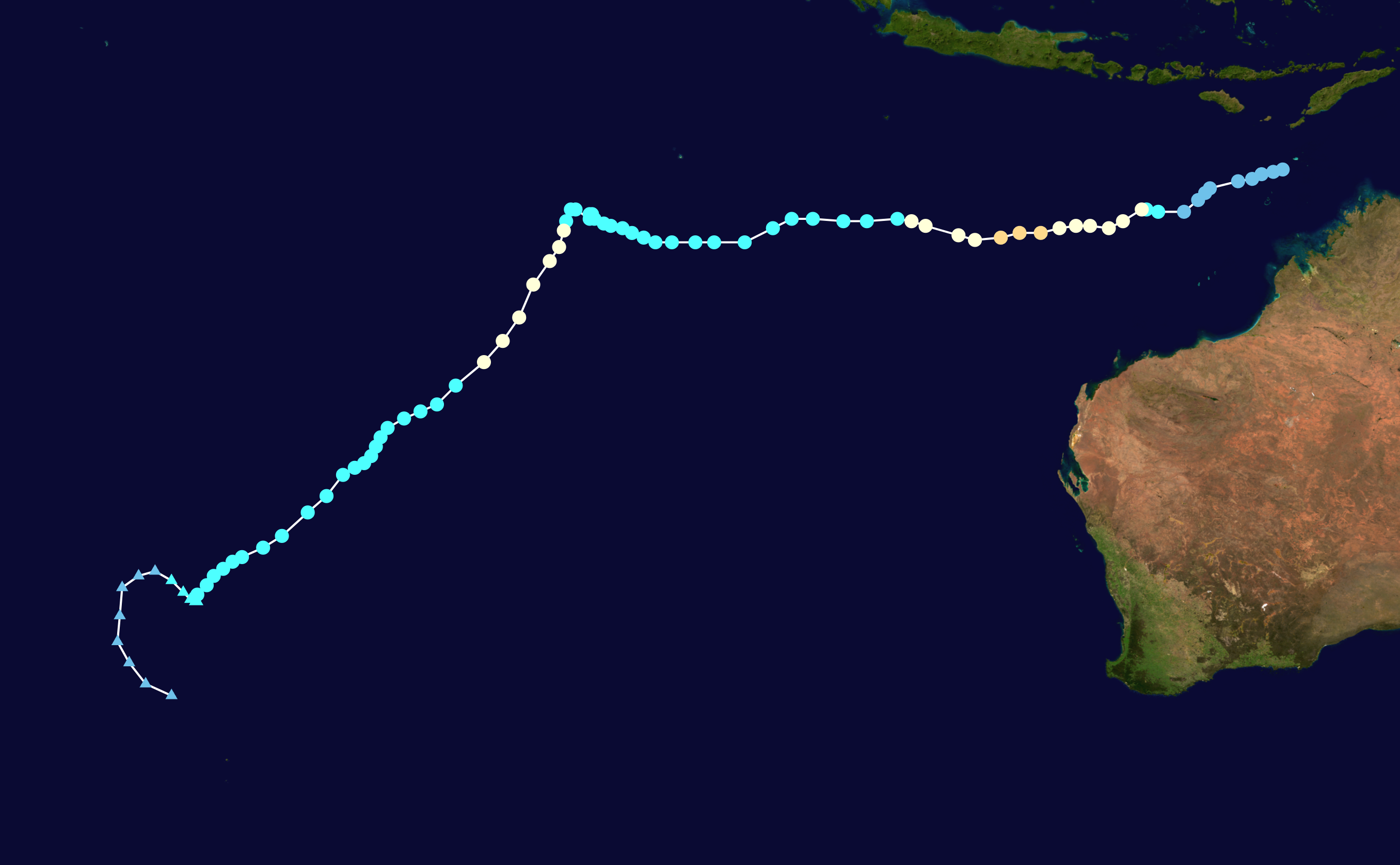
- Duration: 12 February (Entered basin) – 18 February
- Peak intensity: 110 km/h (70 mph) (10-min); 976 hPa (mbar)

On 12 February, Tropical Cyclone Taliah crossed over from the Australian region at severe tropical storm intensity while moving southwest. Taliah then continued on its path while varying in intensity between moderate and strong tropical storm before becoming a post-tropical cyclone on 18 February near 31°S latitude over increasingly cooler waters and showing very sporadic storm activity far from the center. The RSMC La Réunion and the Joint Typhoon Warning Center then ceased their messages.

=== Intense Tropical Cyclone Garance ===
- Intense tropical cyclone (MFR)
- Category 3 tropical cyclone (SSHWS)
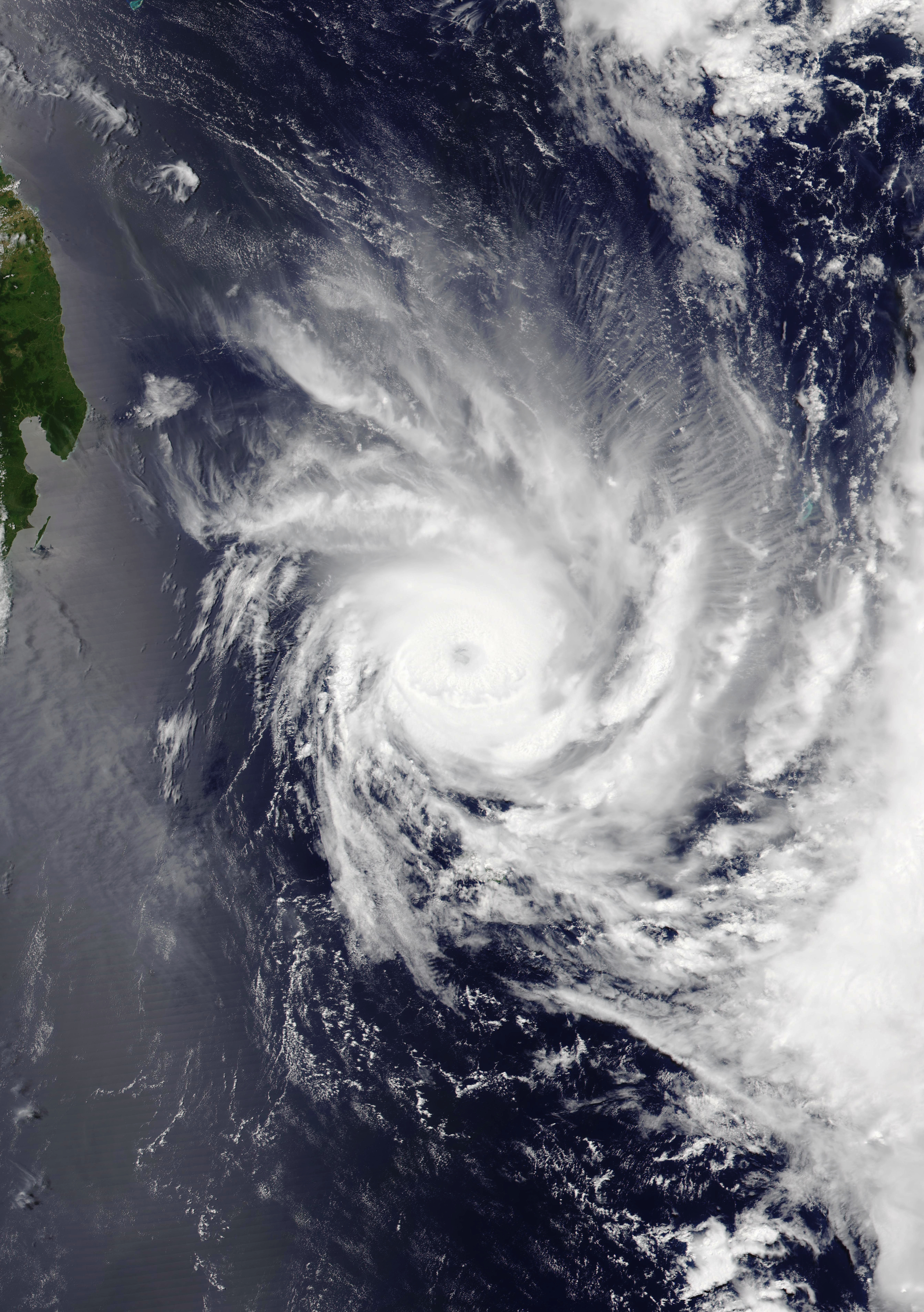
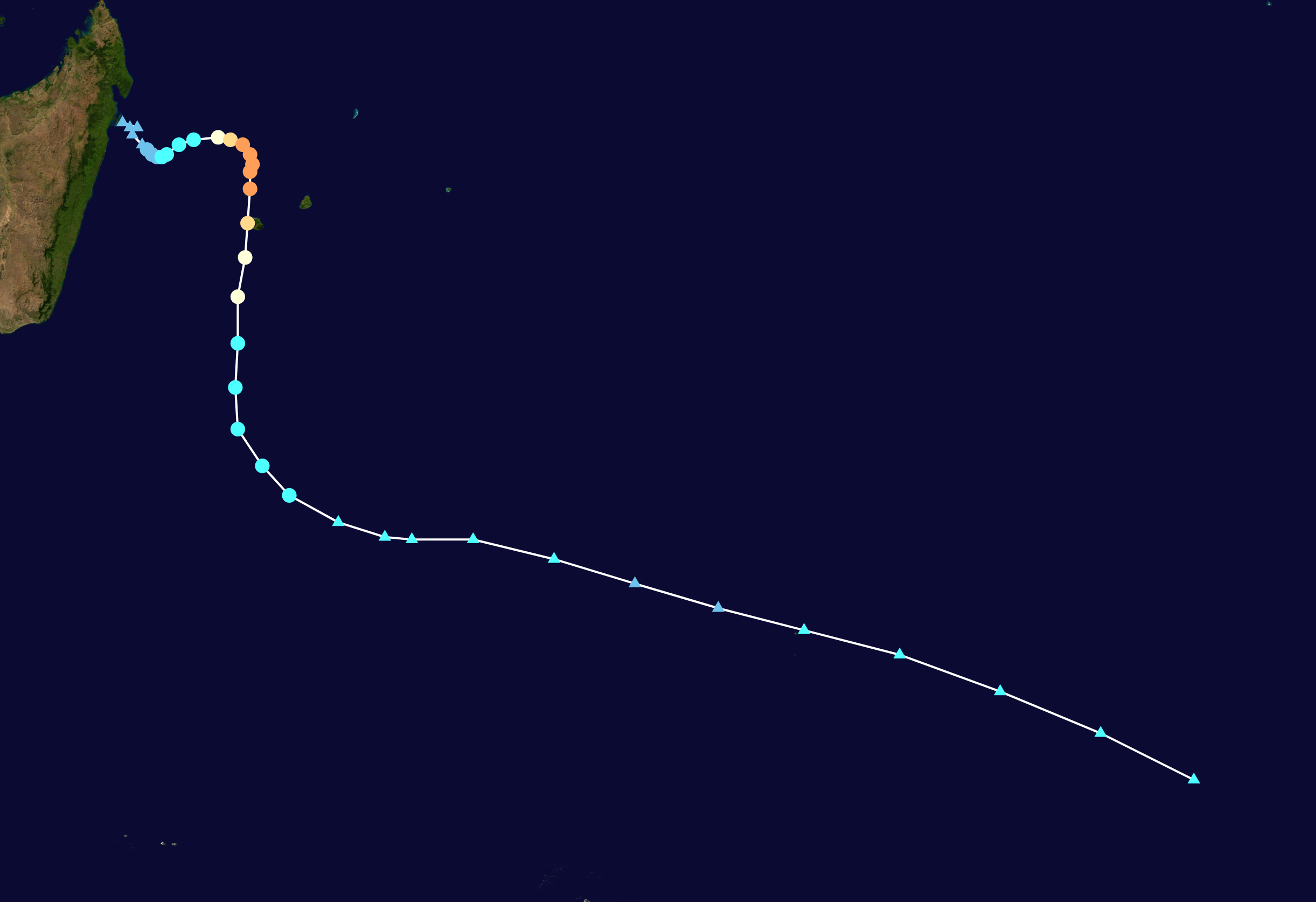
- Duration: 24 February – 2 March
- Peak intensity: 185 km/h (115 mph) (10-min); 947 hPa (mbar)

Météo-France started monitoring what would become Garance on 24 February. It subsequently received the name Garance, and was upgraded to a Moderate Tropical Storm on 25 February. From 26 to 27 February, Garance rapidly intensified into an Intense Tropical Cyclone. The purple alert was issued in Reunion on 28 February, as the cyclone approached. On 28 February, Intense Tropical Cyclone Garance made landfall at 10:00 RET in the morning near Sainte-Suzanne, in the north of Réunion at Tropical Cyclone intensity.

Garance killed five people and left one missing on Réunion, with the cyclone leaving 42% of the island's customers without power. The reinsurer Caisse centrale de réassurance (CCR) estimate the insured loss to be between 160 and 200 million euros ($170–220 million) on 5 March. Total losses are estimated at US$1.05 billion.

=== Tropical Cyclone Honde ===
- Tropical cyclone (MFR)
- Category 1 tropical cyclone (SSHWS)
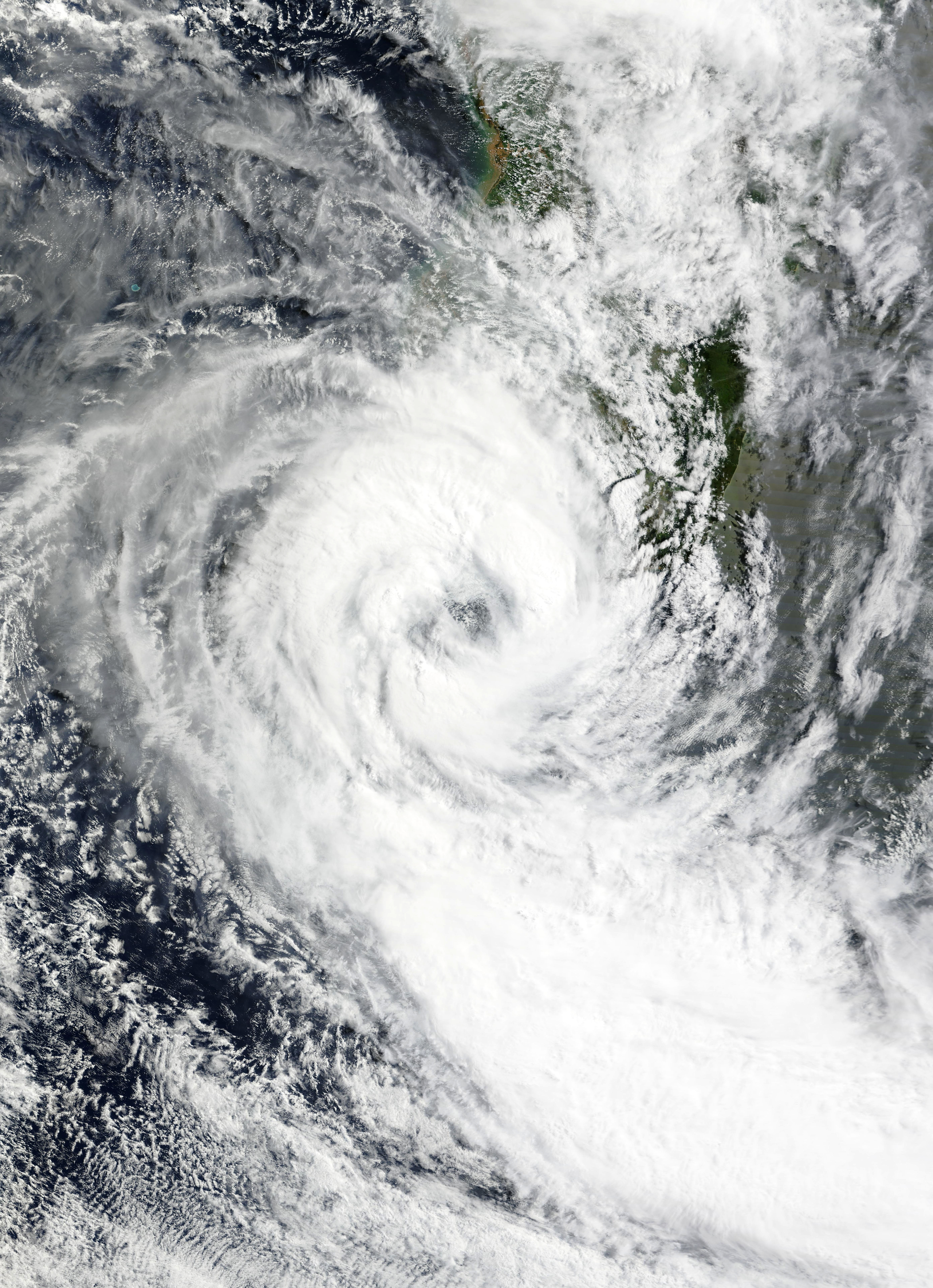
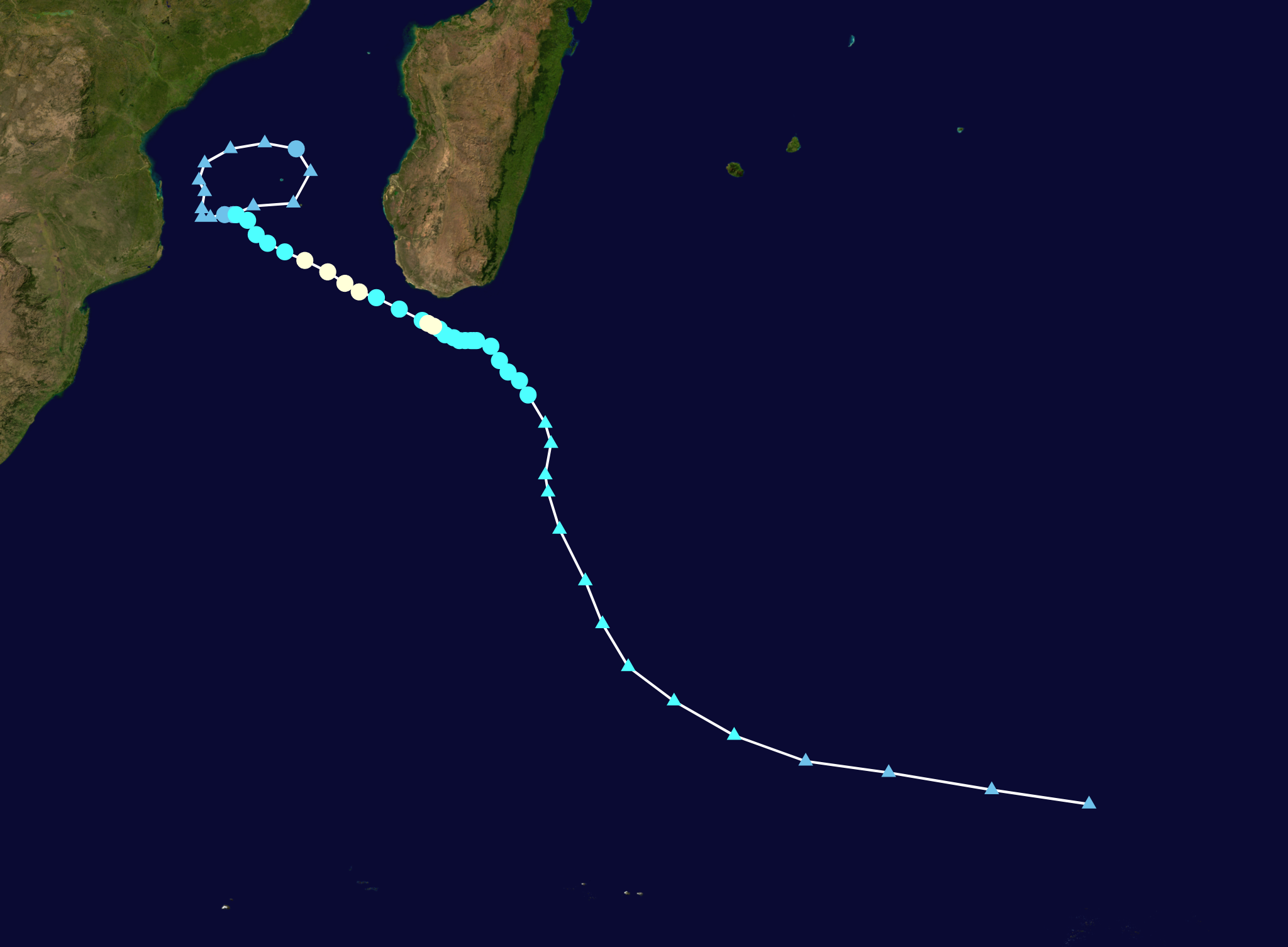
- Duration: 24 February – 5 March
- Peak intensity: 120 km/h (75 mph) (10-min); 969 hPa (mbar)

Météo-France began monitoring an area of potential development in the southern Mozambique Channel on 24 February. Unlike Garance, which organised quickly, this system was much larger and more disorganised, requiring more time to develop. Météo-France officially upgraded Honde to a Moderate Tropical Storm on 26 February. Subsequently, it gradually strengthened to a Severe Tropical Storm the following day, before reaching Tropical Cyclone stage on 28 February, when it made its closest approach to Madagascar. Honde weakened into a tropical storm after passing Madagascar. Before turning extratropical, Honde briefly strengthened into a severe tropical storm on 5 March in the Southern Indian Ocean.

Honde caused severe damage in Madagascar. 43,200 people were affected, mainly in the Andrefana and Menabe regions. 7,200 homes were damaged and 1,900 homes were destroyed from strong winds and flooding. Three people were killed and 69 were injured during the storm. Losses are estimated at US$10 million.

=== Tropical Cyclone Jude ===
- Tropical cyclone (MFR)
- Category 1 tropical cyclone (SSHWS)
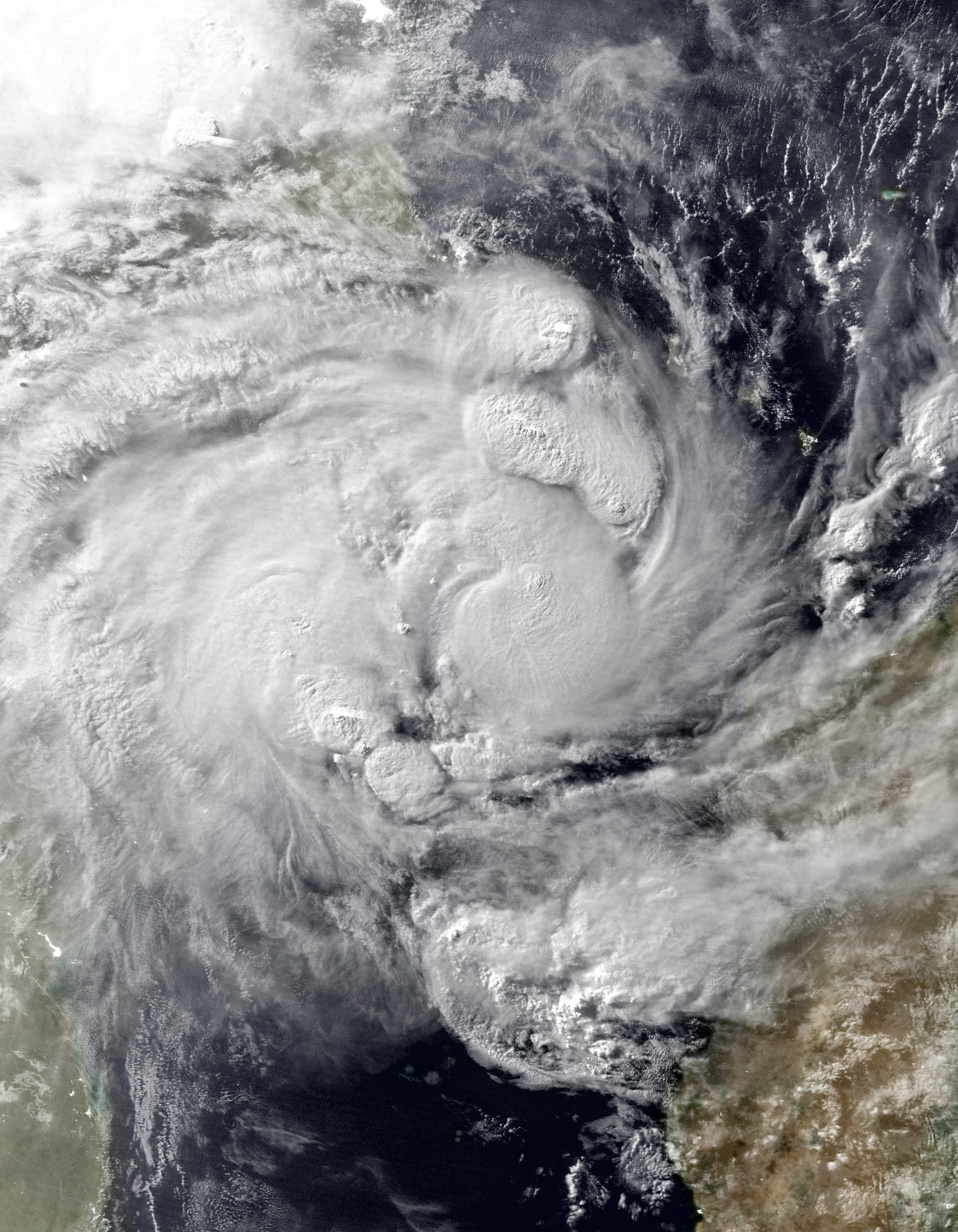
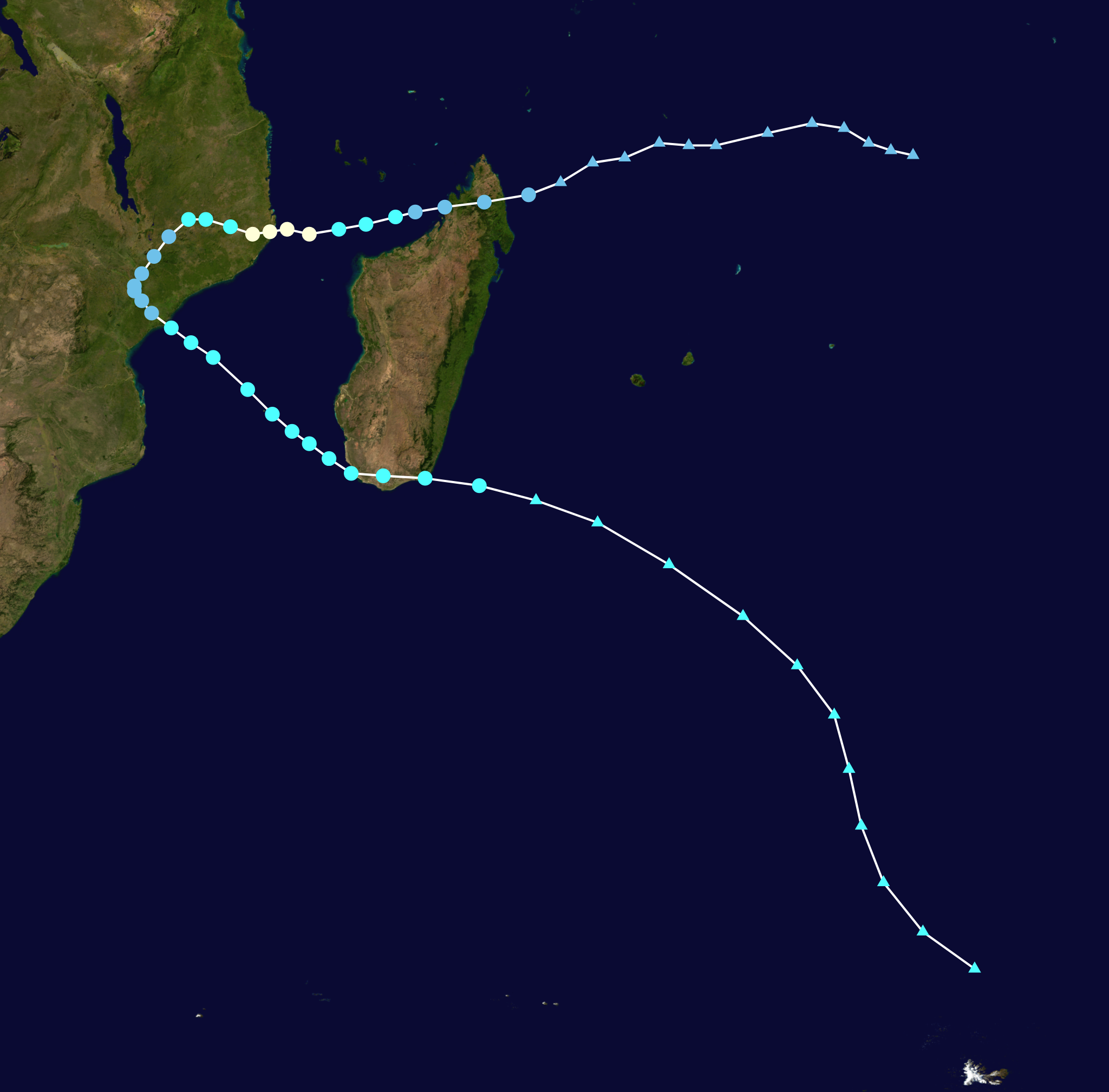
- Duration: 6 March – 16 March
- Peak intensity: 130 km/h (80 mph) (10-min); 972 hPa (mbar)

Météo-France began monitoring a disturbance south of the Chagos Islands on 6 March. It got upgraded to a depression a day later. It was then upgraded to a Moderate Tropical Storm on 8 March, where it got the name Jude. The tropical cyclone made landfall in Cabaceira, Mozambique as a Category 1 at 10 March. The system turned subtropical on 16 March after emerging in the Southern Indian Ocean.

In the municipality of Nacala-Porto, six fatalities were recorded. Overall, the cyclone caused 16 fatalities in Mozambique, 2 in Madagascar, and 3 in Malawi. Losses are estimated at US$110 million.

=== Severe Tropical Storm Ivone ===
- Severe tropical storm (MFR)
- Tropical storm (SSHWS)
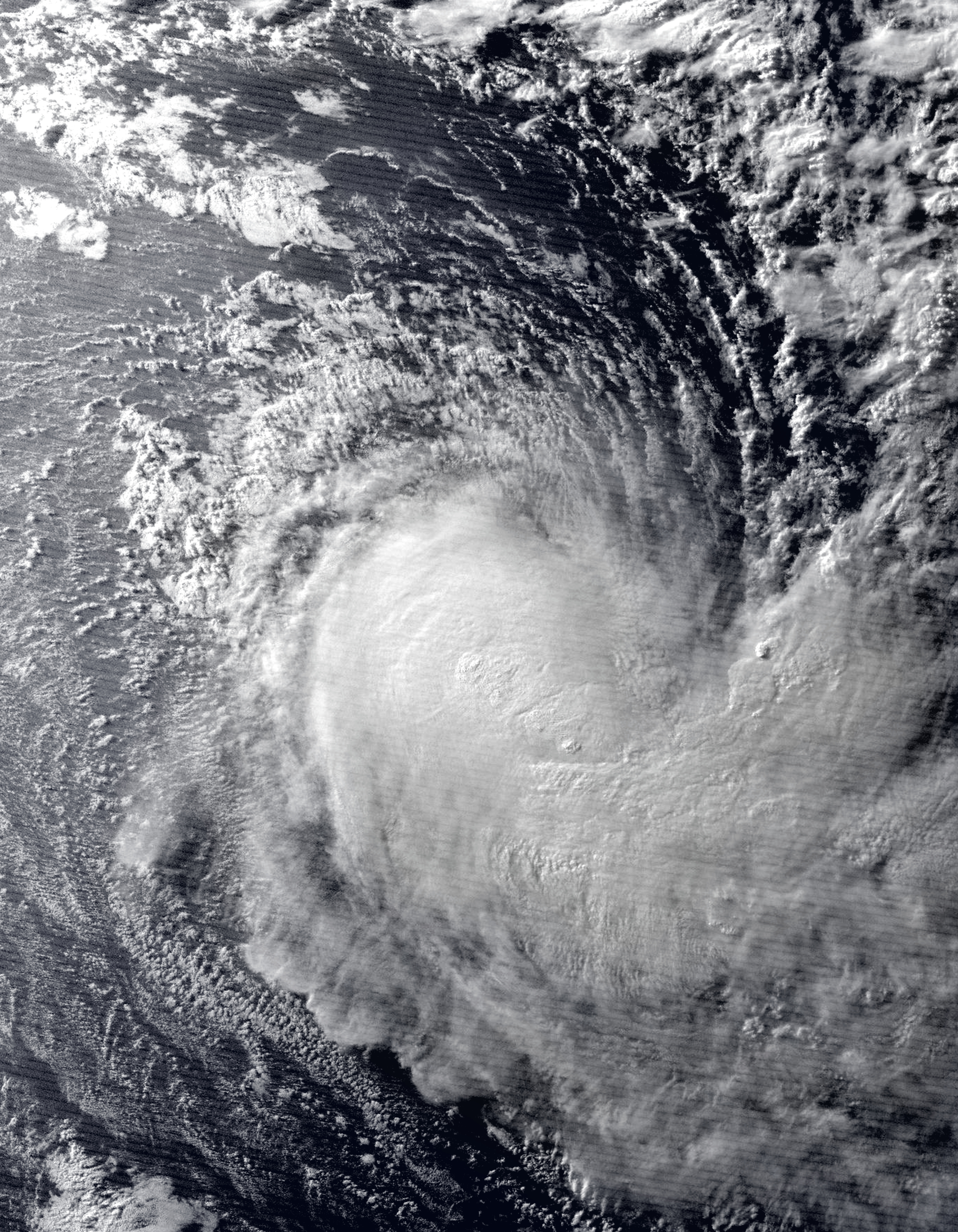
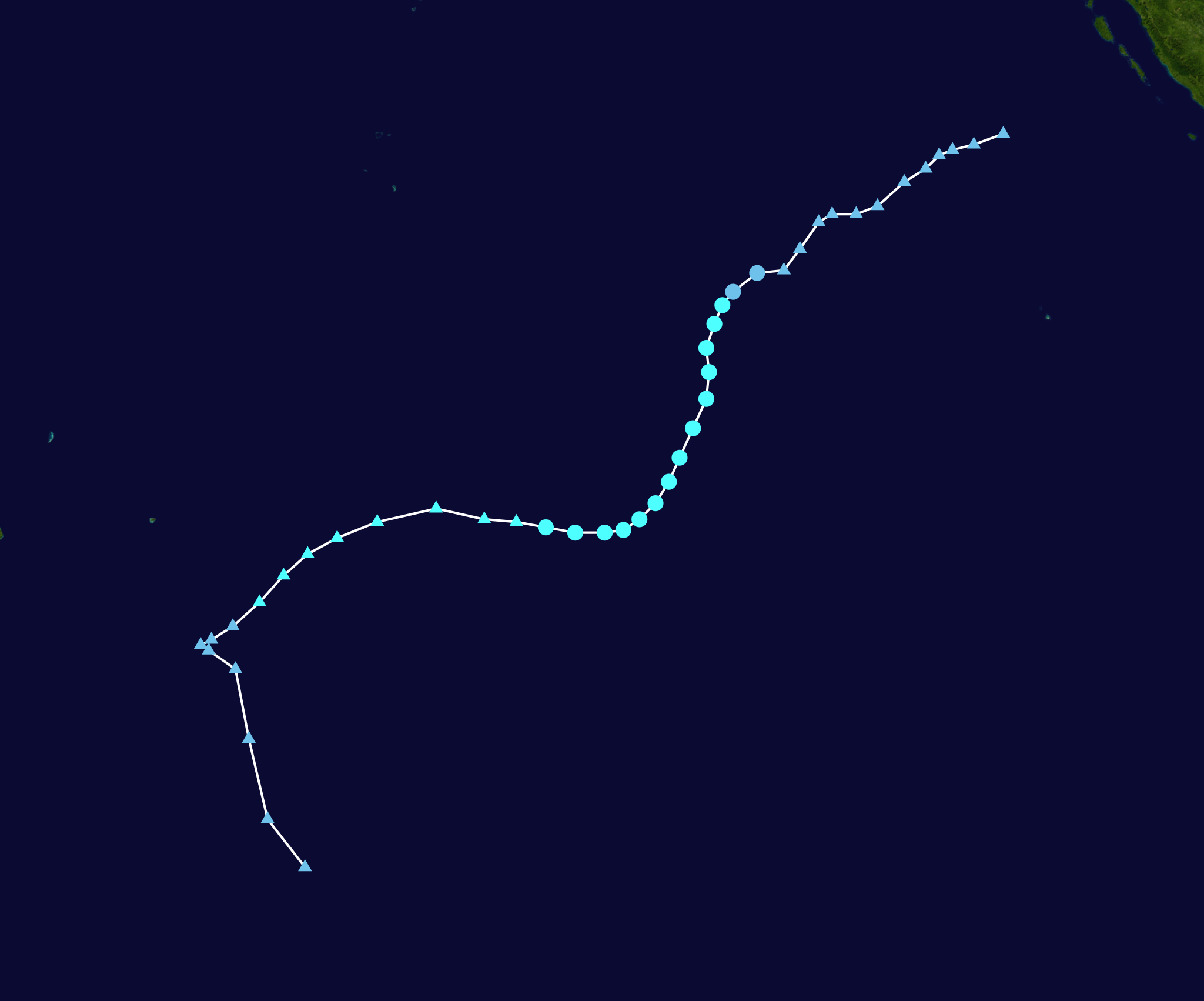
- Duration: 8 March (Entered basin) – 11 March
- Peak intensity: 95 km/h (60 mph) (10-min); 987 hPa (mbar)

Météo-France started monitoring this system in the extreme eastern reaches of the basin on 8 March. The disturbance originated from a weak equatorial trough east of 90°E before gradually consolidating as it moved westward. It was upgraded to Moderate Tropical Storm Ivone the same day. Ivone struggled to intensify due to moderate easterly wind shear and limited upper‑level outflow, which prevented further organization. Throughout its lifespan, the storm maintained an asymmetric structure with most convection displaced to the southwest of the center. Increasing shear and dry air intrusion caused Ivone to weaken steadily before dissipating on 11 March.

=== Intense Tropical Cyclone Courtney ===
- Intense tropical cyclone (MFR)
- Category 4 tropical cyclone (SSHWS)
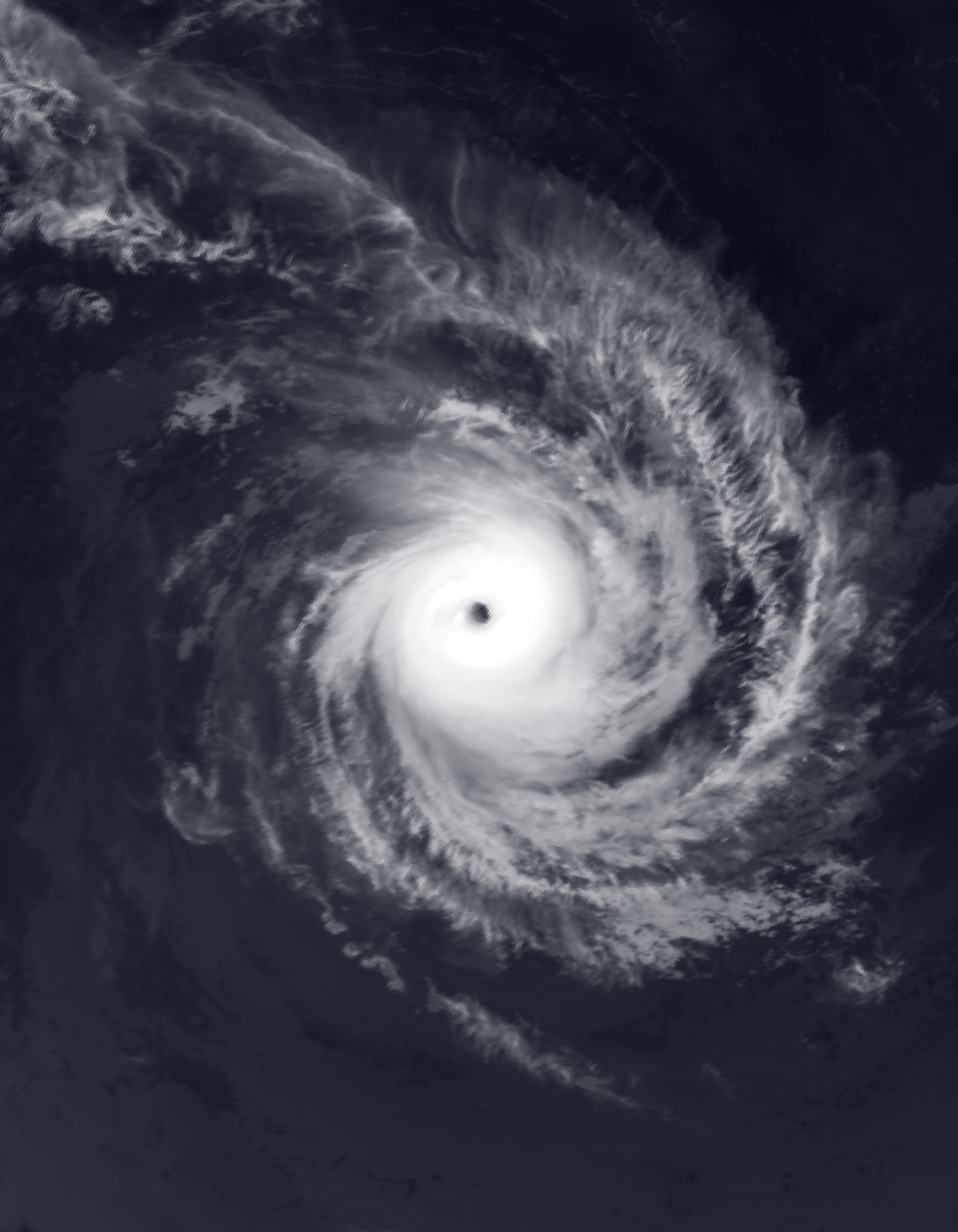
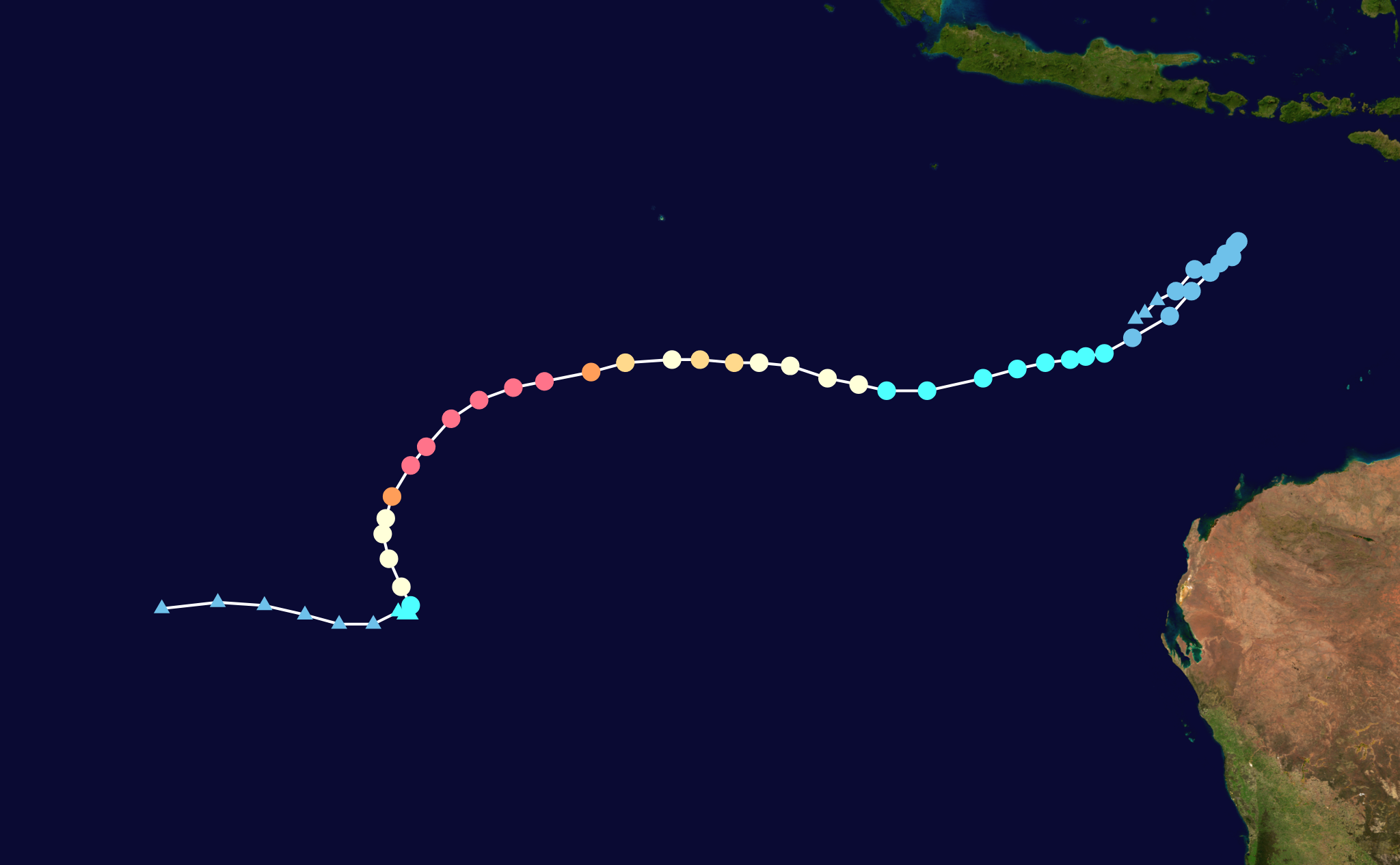
- Duration: 29 March (Entered basin) – 31 March
- Peak intensity: 195 km/h (120 mph) (10-min); 943 hPa (mbar)

On 29 March, Severe Tropical Cyclone Courtney entered from the Australian region. The system intensified further to a 140 mph (220 km/h) cyclone with a minimum central pressure of 929 according to Meteo France shortly after its arrival in the basin. Later that day, it started to show signs of weakening due to cooler sea surface temperatures. The Dvorak analysis carried out by the RSMC initially gave winds at 140 mph. The best track has therefore been revised slightly downwards to peaking at 120 mph instead. Courtney turned into a post-tropical cyclone due to nearby dry air, wind shear, and cooler water while traversing through the Indian Ocean. The remnants of Courtney then travelled between Australia and Antarctica. There were no reports of damages.

=== Subtropical Storm Kanto ===
- Subtropical storm (MFR)
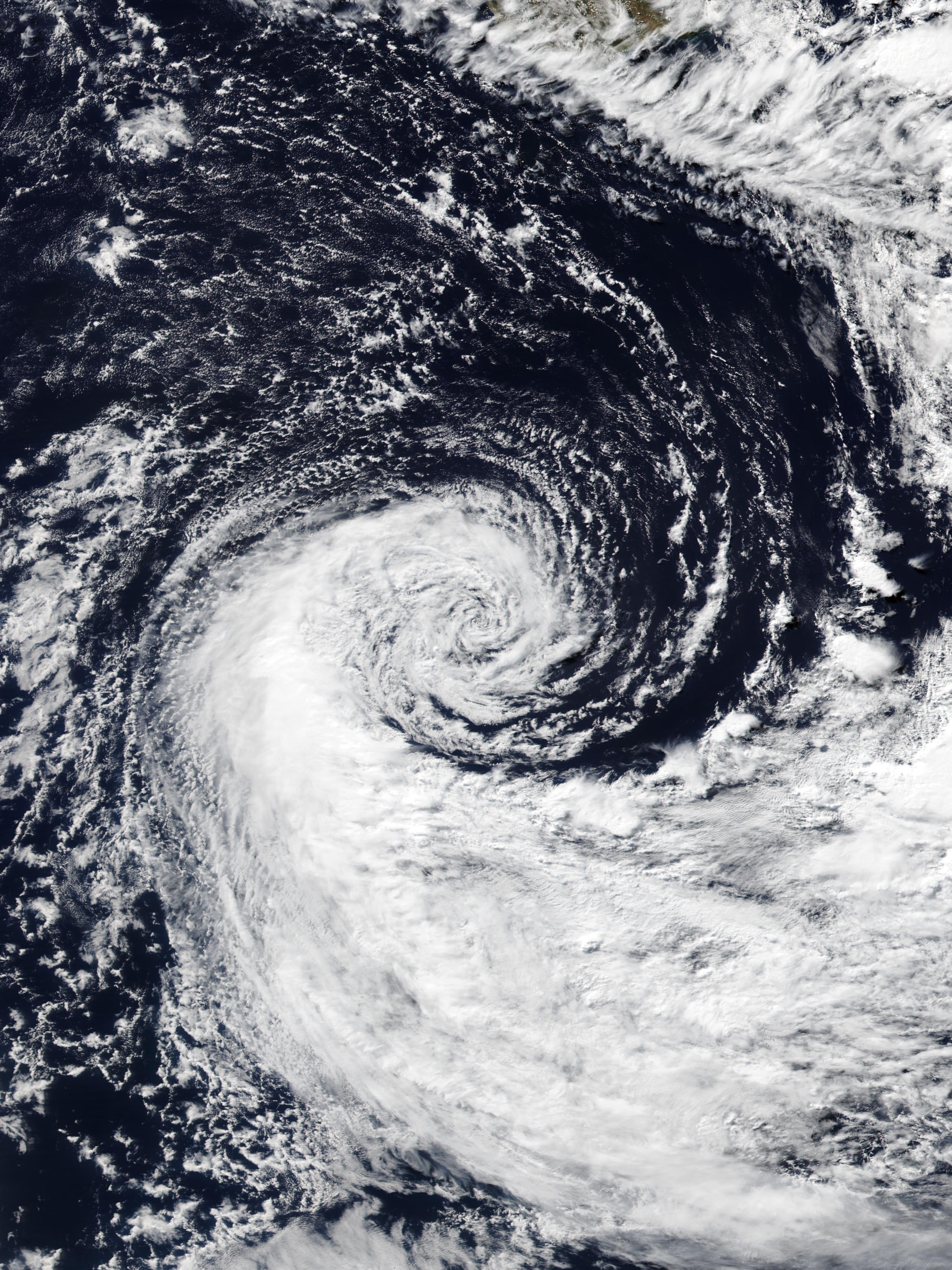
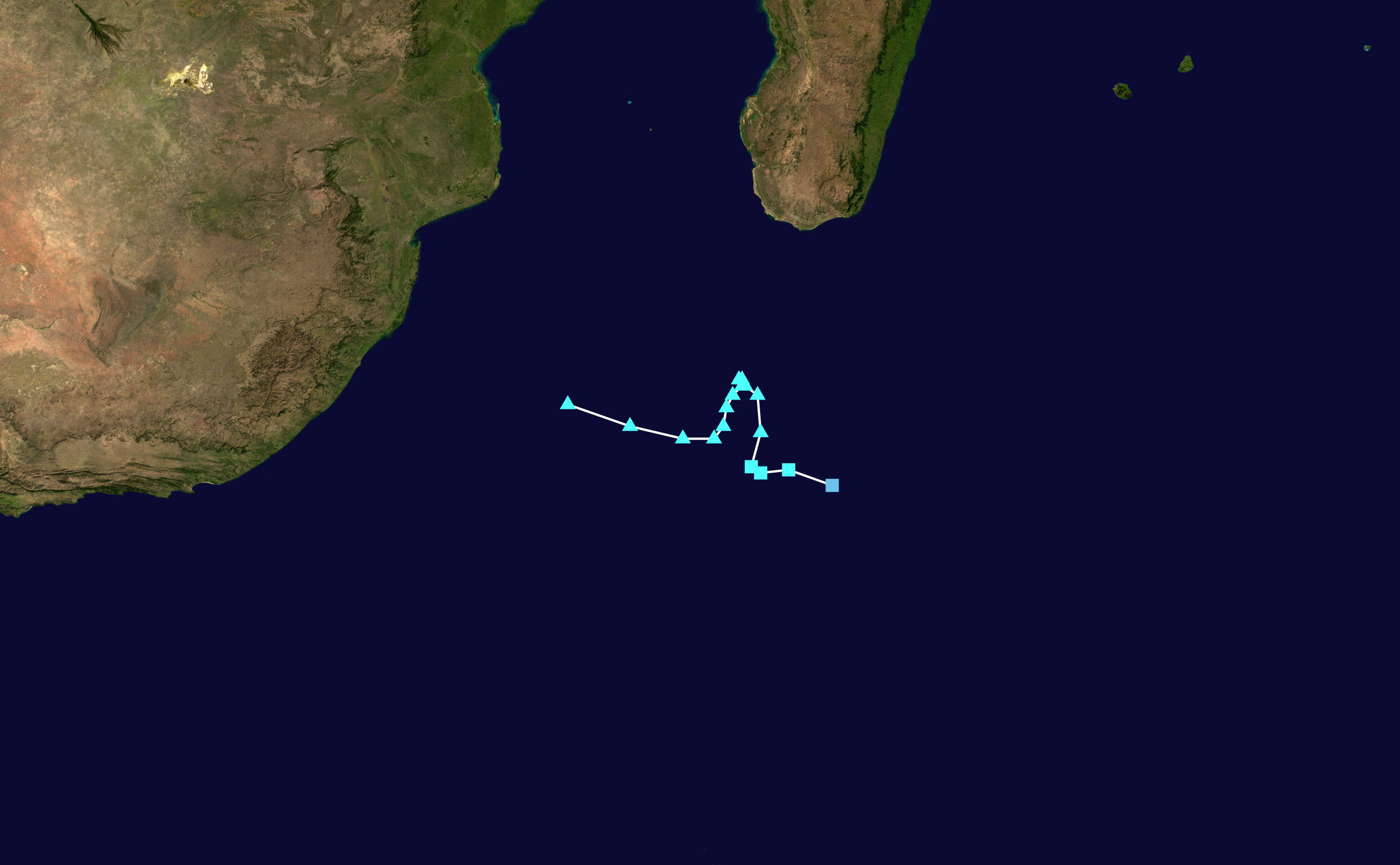
- Duration: 20 April – 21 April
- Peak intensity: 85 km/h (50 mph) (10-min); 994 hPa (mbar)

Meteo France began monitoring an extratropical system hundreds of miles south of Madagascar. On the evening of 20 April, the system transitioned into a subtropical storm, thus receiving the name Kanto by Madagascar Meteorological services.

Kanto was the first subtropical system to develop in the region since Subtropical Depression Issa during the 2021–22 season. It was also the first to be designated a "subtropical storm" by Meteo France, which was introduced as a category for subtropical cyclones with maximum sustained winds above 65 km/h (40 mph) beginning with the 2024–25 season.

== Storm names ==
Within the South-West Indian Ocean, tropical depressions and subtropical depressions that are judged to have 10-minute sustained windspeeds of 65 km/h (40 mph) by the Regional Specialized Meteorological Center on Réunion island, France (RSMC La Réunion) are usually assigned a name. However, it is the Sub-Regional Tropical Cyclone Advisory Centers in Mauritius and Madagascar who name the systems. The Sub-Regional Tropical Cyclone Advisory Center (Mauritius Meteorological Services) in Mauritius names a storm if it intensifies into a moderate tropical storm between 55°E and 90°E. If instead a cyclone intensifies into a moderate tropical storm between 30°E and 55°E then the Sub-Regional Tropical Cyclone Advisory Center (Meteo Madagascar) in Madagascar assigns the appropriate name to the storm. Storm names are taken from three pre-determined lists of names, which rotate on a triennial basis, with any names that have been used automatically removed. New names this season are: Ancha, Bheki, Chido, Dikeledi, Elvis, Faida, Garance, Honde, Ivone, Jude, Kanto and Lira. They replaced Ana, Batsirai, Cliff, Dumako, Emnati, Fezile, Gombe, Halima, Issa, Jasmine and Karim during the 2021–22 season, and also Letlama, which was not used, but the reason for its removal is unknown.

- Ancha
- Bheki
- Chido
- Dikeledi
- Elvis
- Faida
- Garance
- Honde
- Ivone
- Jude
- Kanto
- Lira (unused)
- Maipelo (unused)
- Njazi (unused)
- Oscar (unused)
- Pamela (unused)
- Quentin (unused)
- Rajab (unused)
- Savana (unused)
- Themba (unused)
- Uyapo (unused)
- Viviane (unused)
- Walter (unused)
- Xangy (unused)
- Yemurai (unused)
- Zanele (unused)

If a tropical cyclone crosses 90°E into the South-West Indian basin from the Australian region basin, it will retain the name assigned to it by the Australian Bureau of Meteorology (BoM). The following storms were named in this manner.

- Vince
- Taliah
- Courtney

Ancha and Bheki were both counted as off-season South-west Indian Ocean tropical cyclones.

After the season, the eleven names used were automatically retired and replaced with Ainga, Basil, Cassia, Deba, Etienne, Fatuma, Gori, Henning, Itai, Josha and Kalulu, respectively for the 2027-28 season. Additionally, the unused names Lira, Rajab, Savana, and Xangy were replaced by Letlama, Rouma, Soary, and Xavier respectively.

== Season effects ==
This table lists all of the tropical cyclones and subtropical cyclones that were monitored during the 2024–2025 South-West Indian Ocean cyclone season. Information on their intensity, duration, name, areas affected, primarily comes from RSMC La Réunion. Death and damage reports come from either press reports or the relevant national disaster management agency while the damage totals are given in 2024 or 2025 USD.

Name	Dates	Peak intensity			Areas affected	Damage (USD)	Deaths	Ref(s).
Name	Dates	Category	Wind speed	Pressure	Areas affected	Damage (USD)	Deaths	Ref(s).
01	15 – 17 August	Tropical depression	55 km/h (35 mph)	1000 hPa (29.53 inHg)	Chagos Archipelago	None	0	
Ancha	30 September – 5 October	Moderate tropical storm	85 km/h (50 mph)	992 hPa (29.29 inHg)	None	None	0	
Bheki	12 – 23 November	Intense tropical cyclone	195 km/h (120 mph)	943 hPa (27.85 inHg)	Mascarene Islands	Unknown	0	
Chido	5 – 16 December	Intense tropical cyclone	215 km/h (130 mph)	935 hPa (27.61 inHg)	Agaléga, Seychelles, Madagascar, Mayotte, Comoros, Mozambique, Malawi, Zimbabwe	>$3.9 billion	173	
Dikeledi	6 – 17 January	Intense tropical cyclone	175 km/h (110 mph)	945 hPa (27.91 inHg)	Madagascar, Mayotte, Comoros, Mozambique, Europa Island	$20 million	9	
Elvis	27 – 31 January	Moderate tropical storm	85 km/h (50 mph)	990 hPa (29.23 inHg)	Mozambique, Madagascar	Unknown	0	
Faida	28 January – 4 February	Tropical depression	55 km/h (35 mph)	997 hPa (29.44 inHg)	Mascarene Islands, Madagascar	Unknown	0	
Vince	4 – 11 February	Very intense tropical cyclone	220 km/h (140 mph)	925 hPa (27.32 inHg)	Rodrigues, Île Amsterdam	None	0	
Taliah	12 – 18 February	Tropical cyclone	120 km/h (75 mph)	970 hPa (28.64 inHg)	Île Amsterdam	None	0	
Garance	24 February – 2 March	Intense tropical cyclone	175 km/h (110 mph)	951 hPa (28.08 inHg)	Madagascar, Mascarene Islands	$1.05 billion	5	
Honde	24 February – 5 March	Tropical cyclone	120 km/h (75 mph)	968 hPa (28.59 inHg)	Mozambique, Europa Island, Madagascar, Kerguelen Islands	$10 million	3	
Jude	6 – 16 March	Tropical cyclone	140 km/h (85 mph)	970 hPa (28.64 inHg)	Madagascar, Mayotte, Comoros, Mozambique, Malawi, Europa Island	$110 million	21	
Ivone	8 – 11 March	Severe tropical storm	95 km/h (60 mph)	981 hPa (28.97 inHg)	None	None	0	
Courtney	29 – 31 March	Intense tropical cyclone	195 km/h (120 mph)	943 hPa (27.85 inHg)	None	None	0	
Kanto	20 – 21 April	Subtropical storm	75 km/h (45 mph)	993 hPa (29.32 inHg)	None	None	0	
Season aggregates
15 systems	15 August 2024 – 21 April 2025		220 km/h (140 mph)	925 hPa (27.32 inHg)		$5.09 billion	211	

== See also ==
- Weather of 2024 and 2025
- List of Southern Hemisphere cyclone seasons
- Tropical cyclones in 2024 and 2025
- Atlantic hurricane seasons: 2024, 2025
- Pacific hurricane seasons: 2024, 2025
- Pacific typhoon seasons: 2024, 2025
- North Indian Ocean cyclone seasons: 2024, 2025
- 2024–25 Australian region cyclone season
- 2024–25 South Pacific cyclone season
