= Kanto =

Kanto or Kantō (関東 or 間島, 竿燈) might refer to:

== Places ==
=== Japan ===
- Kantō Plain
- Kantō region
- Kantō-kai, organized crime group

=== China ===
- Kantō may refer to the region of Jiandao (Japanese: 間島 Kantō) in Manchuria, now known more commonly as Yanbian.
- Kantō (関東) is an alternate name for Northeast China or Manchuria used in the following:
  - Kwantung Army (Japanese: 関東軍 Kantōgun), a unit of the Imperial Japanese Army
  - Kwantung Leased Territory (Japanese: 関東州 Kantōshū), a Japanese possession in Northeastern China until the end of World War II

== Arts and entertainment ==
- Kanto (music), a form of Italian theatre and opera popular in Turkey.
- Kanto (rapper), South Korean rapper
- Kanto (comics), a fictional character in the Mr. Miracle series.
- Kanto (Pokémon), a geographical region in the Pokémon media franchise, named after the Japanese region of the same name

== Other uses ==
- KANTO - National Agent Data authority file and name database for persons and corporate bodies
- Subtropical Storm Kanto of the 2024–25 South-West Indian Ocean cyclone season
- Radio Kanto, the former name of Japanese radio station Radio Nippon
- Akita Kantō (Japanese: 竿燈), a festival held in Akita every year
