= Guandong, Guangxi =

Guandong 官垌镇
- Interactive map of Guandong
- Country: People's Republic of China
- Region: Pubei, Qinzhou, Guangxi

Area
  - Total: 199 km^{2} (77 sq mi)

Population
  - Total: about 45,000
- Time zone: UTC+8 (China Standard)
- Area code: 0777
- Licence plate prefixes: 桂N

Guandong (Chinese: 官垌) is a Chinese town located in northeastern Pubei, Qinzhou, Guangxi, which is famous for Guandong fish.
