= Korean dialects =

Korean
- Native speakers: 75 million (2007)
- Language family: Koreanic: Korean
- Dialects: Hamgyŏng (NE); Pyŏngan (NW); Central; Gyeongsang (SE); Jeolla (SW); Jeju (obsolete); Yukchin (?)

Language codes
- ISO 639-1: ko
- ISO 639-2: kor
- ISO 639-3: kor
- Glottolog: kore1280
- Korean dialects in Korea and neighboring areas

A number of Korean dialects are spoken in Korea and by the Korean diaspora. The peninsula is very mountainous and each dialect's "territory" corresponds closely to the natural boundaries between different geographical regions of Korea. Most of the dialects are named for one of the traditional Eight Provinces of Korea. In the Korean language, only the Jeju dialect is considered sufficiently distinct to be regarded as a separate language.

== Dialect areas ==
Dialect zones identified by Shinpei Ogura (1944)

Dialect zones in the National Atlas of Korea

Distribution of tone and length in Korean dialects: tone length no length or tone

Korea is a mountainous country, and this could be the main reason why Korean is divided into numerous small local dialects. There are few clear demarcations, so dialect classification is necessarily to some extent arbitrary and based on the traditional provinces. A common classification, originally introduced by Shinpei Ogura in 1944 and adjusted by later authors, identifies six dialect areas:

=== Hamgyŏng (Northeastern) ===
Spoken in the Hamgyong Province (Kwanbuk and Kwannam) region, the northeast corner of Pyongan Province, and the Ryanggang Province of North Korea as well as Jilin, Heilongjiang of Northeast China; Russia, Uzbekistan, Kazakhstan of former Soviet Union. Nine vowels: the eight of the standard language plus ö. Pyongan (Northwestern) Spoken in Pyongyang, Pyongan Province, Chagang Province, and neighboring Liaoning, of China. In North Korea, the standard language known as Munhwaŏ is designated as "Pyongyang Speech." However, the "Pyongan dialect" is still considered a dialect unless it is explicitly designated as part of Munhwaŏ.

=== Central dialects ===
The central dialect refers to a dialect generally used in the surrounding areas of Hwanghae Province, Gangwon Province (Kangwon Province), and Chungcheong Province, centering on Seoul and Gyeonggi Province. Depending on scholars, it is divided into the Gyeonggi dialect (Central dialect) and Chungcheong dialect from the beginning, or subdivided into Gyeonggi dialect, Gangwon dialect, Hwanghae dialect, and Chungcheong dialect. The central dialect region is very large, so it is not easy to extract features common to all regions. Among its characteristics, it is more difficult to extract the unique characteristics of the central dialect. For example, which dialect has an intonation as a phonological list is very important in the dialect compartment. Most of the central dialects do not have intonations, but they have intonations in Yeongdong, Gangwon Province, as well as Pyeongchang, Jeongseon, and Yeongwol, the surrounding Yeongseo regions. In the case of vocabulary, the difference is so severe that we do not know how many pieces the central dialect will be divided into. Therefore, the characteristics of the central dialect, which correspond to all regions of the central dialect region, are extremely rare, and if there is such a feature, it is easy to be found in other dialects rather than just the central dialect. Therefore, it may be close to the fact that it is the central dialect that combines the remaining dialects except for other dialects where distinct characteristics are observed, rather than having a specific phenomenon observed only in the central dialect. Since the central dialect consists of sub-dialects that are more heterogeneous than other dialects, it is more likely to be divided into several sub-dialects than any other dialect. Usually, it seems that it can be divided into five sub-dialects.

- Gyeonggi dialect, also called the "Seoul dialect": spoken in the Gyeonggi Province, Seoul and Incheon cities, as well as in Kaesong, Kaepung and Changpung (North Korea). The basis of the standard language for South Korea. Although it is often called Gyeonggi dialect by combining Gyeonggi dialect and Seoul dialect, Seoul has been the capital of Joseon for more than 500 years, so the Seoul dialect is often classified separately because the royal language is permeated. And, it is sometimes called the Gyeonggi dialect by combining the Gyeonggi dialect and the Yeongseo dialect.
- Chungcheong dialect: spoken in the Chungcheong Province (Hoseo) region of South Korea, including the metropolitan city of Daejeon. The dialect of Chungcheong Province is a dialect with the most elements of the Jeolla dialect among the Central dialects, and can also be divided into the other. Some parts of South Chungcheong Province, including Daejeon and Sejong, are classified as southern dialects such as the Jeolla and Gyeongsang dialects.
- Yeongseo dialect: spoken in Yeongseo, Gangwon Province (South Korea) and neighboring Kangwon Province (North Korea) to the west of the Taebaek Mountains. Yeongseo is quite distinct from the Yeongdong dialect to the east of the mountains. Unlike the Yeongdong dialect, the Yeongseo dialect has not been studied much because it is almost similar to the Gyeonggi dialect, and scholars often see it as just a part of Gyeonggi dialect.
- Yeongdong dialect: spoken in Yeongdong, Gangwon Province (South Korea) and neighboring Kangwon Province (North Korea) to the east of the Taebaek Mountains. Yeongdong is quite distinct from the Central Korean dialects to the west of the mountains. There are many elements of the Gyeongsang dialect, and sometimes the Hamgyŏng dialect is mixed, and it has many characteristics that are not present in the rest of the Central dialect.
- Hwanghae dialect: spoken in Hwanghae Province of North Korea. The Hwanghae dialect is a dialect with the most elements of the Pyongan dialect among the Central dialects, and can also be divided into the other. Hwanghae dialect was commonly included among the Central dialects, but some researchers argue that it does not fit there comfortably. Because the division between South Korea and North Korea has prolonged, the Hwanghae dialect has been strongly influenced by the Pyongan dialect, and now more and more people see it as a sub-dialect of the Pyongan dialect, not the Central dialect.

In any case, the central dialect can be said to be a dialect that can vary in various areas of the dialect depending on the criteria for the dialect compartment. For example, Hwanghae, Gyeonggi, Gangwon and Chungcheong are usually grouped together as the Central dialect region. But, many view that only Hwanghae, Gyeonggi, and Gangwon dialects are included in the central dialect, while Chungcheong dialect is considered as separate dialect.

=== Gyeongsang (Southeastern) ===
Spoken in Gyeongsang Province (Yeongnam) of South Korea, including the cities of Busan, Daegu and Ulsan. This dialect is easily distinguished from the Seoul dialect because its pitch is more varied. Six vowels, i, e, a, eo, o, u.

=== Jeolla (Southwestern) ===
Spoken in the Jeolla Province (Honam) region of South Korea, including the city of Gwangju. Ten vowels: i, e, ae, a, ü, ö, u, o, eu, eo.

=== Jeju ===
Spoken on Jeju Island off the southwest coast of South Korea and is sometimes considered a separate Koreanic language. The nine vowels of Middle Korean, including arae-a (ɔ). May have additional consonants as well. Several linguists have suggested that a further dialect area should be split from the Northeastern dialects: Ryukchin (Yukchin) Spoken in the historical Yukchin region which is located in the northern part of North Hamgyong Province, far removed from P'yŏng'an, but has more in common with P'yŏng'an dialects than with the surrounding Hamgyŏng dialects. Since it has been isolated from the major changes of Korean language, it has preserved distinct features of Middle Korean. While lexically it shows little difference from the Hamgyong(Northeastern) dialect, it displays certain distinctions in its phonological system and sentence-final endings. Due to these features, it is sometimes classified as a sub-dialect of the Northeastern dialect region, and at other times established as an independent dialect region.

A recent statistical analysis of these dialects suggests that the hierarchical structure within these dialects are highly uncertain, meaning that there is no quantitative evidence to support a family-tree-like relationship among them.

Some researchers classify the Korean dialects in Western and Eastern dialects. Compared with Middle Korean, the Western dialects have preserved long vowels, while the Eastern dialects have preserved tones or pitch accent. The Jeju language and some dialects in North Korean make no distinction between vowel length or tone. But the Southeastern dialect and the Northeastern dialect may not be closely related to each other genealogically.

== Standard language ==
Korean is a pluricentric language:

- In South Korea, Standard Korean (Pyojun-eo) is defined by the National Institute of the Korean Language as "the modern speech of Seoul widely used by the well-cultivated". It is very similar to Incheon, most of Gyeonggi and the western part of Gangwon (Yeongseo region).
- In North Korea, the adopting proclamation stated that the language spoken in the capital of Pyongyang should serve as the basis for the North Korean standard language (Munhwaŏ, 'cultured language'). However, in Guidelines on the Juche-Oriented Development of the Korean Language, Kim Il Sung clarified that “Pyongyang speech is neither a purely local vernacular nor a variant of the Pyongan dialect.”. Thus, official North Korean discourse distinguishes it from being merely a local or mixed dialect. In practice, it remains "firmly rooted" in the Gyeonggi dialect, which had been the national standard for centuries, but incorporates some northern dialect words.

Despite North–South differences in the Korean language, the two standards are still broadly intelligible. One notable feature within the divergence is the North's lack of anglicisms and other foreign borrowings due to isolationism and self-reliance—pure/invented Korean words are used in replacement.

Usage of regional dialects have been decreasing in both North and South due to social factors. In North Korea, the central government is urging its citizens to use the northern standard language to prevent the use of foul language by the people: Kim Jong Un said in a speech "if your language in life is cultural and polite, you can achieve harmony and comradely unity among people." In South Korea, due to relocation in the population to Seoul to find jobs and the usage of standard language in education and media, the prevalence of regional dialects has decreased. The standard is also commonly used among younger Koreans nationwide and in online contexts. It is the form most widely taught internationally, and has received a further boost from the increasing popularity of K-pop.

== Outside of the Korean peninsula ==
Koryo-mar, based on Hamgyong and Ryukchin dialects, is spoken by the Koryo-saram, ethnic Koreans in the post-Soviet states of Central Asia. It consists of a Korean base vocabulary, but takes many loanwords and calques from Russian language.

Sakhalin Korean Language (사할린 한국어), usually identified as a descendant of the southern dialect, is spoken by the Sakhalin Korean.

== Examples of regional dialects ==
=== Hamgyŏng ===
Rasŏn, most of Hamgyŏng region, northeast P'yŏngan, Ryanggang Province (North Korea), Jilin (China).

- Koreans who have heard the Hamgyŏng dialect describe it as similar in tone to the Gyeongsang and southern Yeongdong dialects.
- It is also the most spoken dialect by North Korean defectors in South Korea, as about 80% of them are from Hamgyŏng Province.
- Koryo-mar, the moribund variety of Korean spoken mainly by elderly Koryo-saram in Central Asia and Russia, is descended from the Northern Hamgyong Dialect, as well as the Yukchin Dialect.

Honorific

Munhwaŏ	Hamgyŏng	Ryukjin
하십시오 (hasibsio)	합소(세) (Habso(se))	합쇼 (Habsyo)
해요 (haeyo)	하오 (Hao)	하오 (Hao)

Ordinary way of speaking (near Hamhung, Hyesan)

- The vowel 'ㅔ(e)' is changed to 'ㅓ(eo)'.
  - example: "Your daughter has come."

Munhwaŏ	Hamgyŏng
당신네 딸이 찾아 왔소. dangsinne ttal-i chaj-a wattso.	당신너 딸이가 찾아 왔슴메. dangsinneo ttal-iga chaj-a wattseumme.

- When calling a superior person, always put the ending '요(yo)' after the noun.
  - example: "Grandpa, come quickly."

Munhwaŏ	Hamgyŏng
할아버지, 빨리 오세요. hal-abeoji, ppalli oseyo.	클아바네요, 빨리 오옵소. keul-abaneyo, ppalli oobso.

- The ending '-니까(-nikka)' is changed to '-길래(-gilrae)'.
  - example: "Come early because you have to cultivate the field."

Munhwaŏ	Hamgyŏng
밭을 매야 하니까 일찍 오너라. bat-eul maeya hanikka iljjig oneola.	밭으 매야 하길래 일찍 오나라. bat-eu maeya hagilrae iljjig onala.

=== P'yŏngan ===
P'yŏngan region, P'yŏngyang, Chagang, northern North Hamgyŏng (North Korea), Liaoning (China)

- It is also the North Korean dialect best known to South Koreans. However, North Korean defectors also claim that South Koreans have less accurate knowledge of the dialect due to the long division.

Honorific

Munhwaŏ	Pyongan
하십시오 hasibsio	하시 hasi
해요 haeyo	해요 haeyo

Ordinary way of speaking

- The vowel 'ㅕ(yeo)' is changed to'ㅔ(e)'.
  - example: armpit

Munhwaŏ	Pyongan
겨드랑이 gyeodeulang-i	게드랑이 gedeulang-i

- If a Sino-Korean word is preceded by a 'ㄹ(r)' pronunciation, it is pronounced as 'ㄴ(n)'. At the same time, if 'ㄹ(r)' is followed by a diphthong containing the [j] sound, the [j] sound is dropped and pronounced as a short vowel.
- In the front part of the pure vocabulary of Middle Korean, [nj] changed to [j] in the Seoul dialect, which changed to [n] in this dialect.
  - example: 1) Summer 2) Seven 3) Trend

Munhwaŏ	Pyongan
여름 yeoleum	너름 neoleum
일곱 ilgob	닐굽 nilgub
류행 ryuhaeng	누행 nuhaeng

- When representing the past, there is a dropout phenomenon of 'ㅆ(ss/tt)'.
  - example: "I brought this."

Munhwaŏ	Pyongan
이거 내가 가져왔어 igeo naega gajyeowass-eo.	이거 내가 개와서 igeo naega gaewaseo

=== Hwanghae ===
Hwanghae region (North Korea). Also in the Islands of Yeonpyeongdo, Baengnyeongdo and Daecheongdo in Ongjin County of Incheon.

- Some North Korean scholars, such as Kim Byung-je, do not recognize this distinction and consider the West-North and Gyeonggi dialects to be spoken in the region.
- It is known that dialects are spoken that share characteristics of neighboring regional dialects. It is mainly known to have characteristics of both Gyeonggi and Pyeongan dialects.

Honorific

Munhwaŏ	Hwanghae
하십시오 hasibsio	하서 haseo
해요 haeyo	해요 haeyo
습니까 seubnikka	시꺄 shikkya

Ordinary way of speaking

- Many of the vowels are pronounced as 'ㅣ(i)'.
  - example: habit

Munhwaŏ	Hwanghae
습관 seubgwan	십관 sibgwan

- '네(ne)' is used as a questionable form.
  - example: "Did you eat?"

Munhwaŏ	Hwanghae
밥 먹었니? bab meog-eossni?	밥 먹었네? bab meog-eossne?

- '-누만(-numan)' is often used as an exclamation sentence.
  - example: "It got a lot colder"

Munhwaŏ	Hwanghae
많이 추워졌구나 manh-i chuwojyeottguna	많이 추어졌누만 manh-i chueojyeottnuman

Areas in Northwest Hwanghae, such as Ongjin County in Hwanghae Province, pronounced 'ㅈ' (j'), originally pronounced the letter more closely to tz. However, this has largely disappeared. The rest is almost similar to the Gyeonggi and Pyongan dialect.

=== Gyeonggi ===
Seoul, Incheon, Gyeonggi region (South Korea), as well as Kaeseong, Gaepoong and Changpung in North Korea.

- Seoul dialect, which was the basis of Pyojuneo, is a subdialect of Gyeonggi dialect.
- About 70% of all Seoul dialect vocabulary has been adopted as Pyojuneo, and only about 10% out of 30% of Seoul dialect vocabulary that has not been adopted in Pyojuneo have been used so far.
- Gyeonggi dialect is the least existential dialect in South Korea, and most people do not know that Gyeonggi dialect itself exists. So, Gyeonggi-do residents say they only use standard language, and many people know the language spoken by Gyeonggi-do residents as standard language in other regions.
- Recently, young people have come to realize that there is a dialect in Seoul as they are exposed to the Seoul dialect through media such as YouTube.
- Among the Gyeonggi dialects, the best known dialect along with Seoul dialect is Suwon dialect. The dialects of Suwon and its surrounding areas are quite different from those of northern Gyeonggi Province and surrounding areas of Seoul.
- In some areas of the southern part of Gyeonggi Province, which is close to Chungcheong Province, such as Pyeongtaek and Anseong, it is also included in the Chungcheong dialect area. Local residents living in these areas also admit that they speak Chungcheong dialect.
- Traditionally, coastal areas of Gyeonggi, particularly Incheon, Ganghwa, Ongjin and Gimpo have been recorded to have some influence from the dialects of Hwanghae and Chungcheong, due to historic intermixing with the two regions, as well as geographical proximity. This old influence, however, has largely died out among most middle aged and younger locals from the region.
- Originally, northern Gyeonggi Province, including Seoul, received influence from Northern dialects (Areas of Kaeseong along the Ryesong River, or Ganghwa Island, received an especially high amount of influence from the Hwanghae dialect), while southern Gyeonggi Province was influenced from Chungcheong dialect. However, as a result of the prolonged division and the large number of migrants from Chungcheong Province and Jeolla Province to Seoul, the current way of speaking in Gyeonggi has been greatly influenced by Chungcheong and Jeolla.

Honorific

Pyojuneo	Gyeonggi
하십시오 hasibsio	-
하오 hao	하우/허우 hau/heou
해요 haeyo	해요 haeyo

Ordinary way of speaking

- The vowel 'ㅏ(a)' is changed to 'ㅓ(eo)', and 'ㅓ(eo)' is changed to 'ㅡ(eu)'.
  - example: 1) "It hurts." 2) "It's dirty"

Pyojuneo	Gyeonggi
아파 apa	아퍼 apeo
더러워 deoleowo	드러워 deuleowo

- The vowel 'ㅏ(a)' and 'ㅓ(eo)' are sometimes changed to 'ㅐ(ae)'.
  - example: 1) Sesame oil 2) "You look like a fool."

Pyojuneo	Gyeonggi
참기름 chamgileum	챔기름 chaemgileum
너 바보 같아 neo babo gat-a	너 바보 같애 neo babo gat-ae

- The vowel 'ㅗ(o)' is mainly changed to 'ㅜ(u)'.
  - example: 1) "What are you doing?" 2) uncle

Pyojuneo	Gyeonggi
뭐하고 있어? mwohago iss-eo?	뭐허구 있어? mwoheogu iss-eo?
삼촌 samchon	삼춘 samchun

- Dialects of Suwon and its surrounding areas.
  - The ending '~거야(geoya)' ends briefly with '~거(geo)'
    - example: "Where will you go?"

Pyojuneo	Suwon
어디 갈 거야? eodi gal geoya?	어디 갈 거? eodi gal geo?

=== Gangwon ===
Yeongseo (Gangwon (South Korea)/Kangwŏn (North Korea) west of the Taebaek Mountains), Yeongdong (Gangwon (South Korea)/Kangwŏn (North Korea), east of the Taebaek Mountains)

- Gangwon Province is divided between Yeongseo and Yeongdong due to the Taebaek Mountains, so even if it is the same Gangwon Province, there is a significant difference in dialect between the two regions.
- In the case of the Yeongseo dialect, the accent is slightly different from the dialect of Gyeonggi Province, but most of the vocabulary is similar to the dialect of Gyeonggi Province.
- Unlike the Yeongseo dialect, Yeongdong dialect has a tone, such as Hamgyeong dialect and Gyeongsang dialect.
- Gangwon dialect is the least spoken dialect of all dialects in South Korea except Jeju.

Honorific

Pyojuneo	Yeongseo	Yeongdong
하십시오 hasibsio	-Lack of data-	-
하오 hao	하오, 하우 hao, hau	하오 hao
해요 haeyo	해오 haeyo	해요 haeyo

Ordinary way of speaking

- There are pronunciations, such as 'ㆉ(yoi)' and 'ㆌ(yui)', that you cannot hear in most regions of Korea.
- The vowel 'ㅠ(yu)' is changed to 'ㅟ(wi)' or 'ㆌ(yui)'.
  - example: Vacation

Pyojuneo	Gangwon
휴가 hyuga	휘가 hwiga

- Use '나(na)' a lot in questionable form.
  - example: "What are you doing lately?"

Pyojuneo	Gangwon(Yeongdong)
요즘 뭐해? yojeum mwohae?	요즘 뭐하나? yojeum mwohana?

=== Chungcheong ===
Daejeon, Sejong, Chungcheong region (South Korea)

- Chungcheong dialect is considered to be the softest dialect to hear among all dialects of Korean.
- Chungcheong dialect is one of the most recognized dialects in South Korea, along with Jeolla dialect and Gyeongsang dialect.
- Chungcheong dialect was the most commonly used dialect by aristocrats(Yangban) during the Joseon dynasty, along with dialects in northern Gyeongsang Province.
- In the case of Chungcheong dialect, it is a dialect belonging to the central dialect along with Gyeonggi, Gangwon, and Hwanghae dialects, but some scholars view it as a separate dialect separated from the central dialect. In addition, some scholars classify southern Chungcheong dialect regions such as Daejeon, Sejong, and Gongju as the southern dialect such as Jeolla and Gyeongsang dialects.

Honorific

Pyojuneo	Chungcheong
하십시오 hasibsio	하시오 hasio
하오 hao	하게 hage
해요 haeyo	해유 (기본) haeyu (General)

Ordinary way of speaking

- The vowel 'ㅑ(ya)' that comes to the ending is changed to 'ㅕ(yeo)'.
  - example: 1) "What are you talking about?" 2) "What are you doing?"

Pyojuneo	Chungcheong
무슨 소리야? museun soliya?	뭔 소리여~? mwon soliyeo~?
뭐하는 거야? mwohaneun geoya?	뭐허는 거여~? / 뭐하는 겨~? mwoheoneun geoyeo~? / mwohaneun gyeo~?

- 'ㅔ(e)' is mainly changed to 'ㅣ(i)', and 'ㅐ(ae)' is mainly changed to 'ㅑ(ya)' or 'ㅕ(yeo)'.
  - example: 1) "He/She/They said he/she/they put it outside." 2) "Would you like to eat this?" 3) "Okay."

Pyojuneo	Chungcheong
그거 바깥에다가 뒀대 geugeo bakkat-edaga dwossdae	고거 바깥이다가 뒀댜~ gogeo bakkat-idaga dwossdya~
이거 먹을래? igeo meog-eullae?	여거 먹을려? / 이거 먹을쳐? yeogeo meog-eullyeo? / igeo meog-eulchyeo?
그래 geulae	그려~ / 그랴~ / 기여~ / 겨~ geulyeo~ / geulya~ / giyeo~ / gyeo~

- The ending '겠(gett)' is mainly pronounced as '겄(geott)', and the ending'까(kka)' is mainly pronounced as '께(kke)'.
  - example: "I've put it all away, so it'll be okay."

Pyojuneo	Chungcheong
내가 다 치워뒀으니까 괜찮겠지 naega da chiwodwoss-eunikka gwaenchanhgettji	내가 다 치워뒀으니께 갠찮겄지 naega da chiwodwoss-eunikke gaenchanhgeottji

The rest is almost similar to the Gyeonggi dialect.

=== Jeolla ===
Gwangju, Jeolla region (South Korea)

- Jeolla dialect is a dialect that feels rough along with Gyeongsang dialect. Especially it is well known for its swearing.
- Jeolla dialect speakers, along with Gyeongsang dialect speakers, have high self-esteem in their local dialects.
- Many Jeolla dialect speakers can be found not only in Jeolla Province but also in Seoul and Gyeonggi Province, because Jeolla Province itself was alienated from development, so many Jeolla residents came to Seoul and Gyeonggi Province.
- Much of Northern Jeolla, especially in areas close to Southern Chungcheong like Jeonju, Gunsan and Wanju have traditionally had weaker accents compared to the south, and in some cases, might be more closer to the Chungcheong dialect in terms of vocabulary and intonation.

Honorific

Pyojuneo	Jeolla
하십시오 hasibsio	허씨요 (기본) heossiyo (General)
하오 hao	허소 heoso
해요 haeyo	허라(우) heola(u)

Ordinary way of speaking

- The vowel 'ㅢ(ui)' is pronounced as 'ㅡ(eu)'.
  - example: Doctor

Pyojuneo	Jeolla
의사 uisa	으사 eusa

- The ending '지(ji)' is pronounced as '제(je)'.
  - example: "That's right."

Pyojuneo	Jeolla
그렇지 geuleohji	그라제 / 글제 geulaje / geulje

- Use a lot of '잉(ing)' at the end of words.
  - example: "It's really pretty."

Pyojuneo	Jeolla
진짜 예쁘다 jinjja yeppeuda	참말로 이쁘다잉~ / 참말로 귄있다잉~ chammallo ippeudaing~ / chammallo gwin-ittdaing~

Famously, natives of Southern Jeolla pronounce certain combinations of vowels in Korean more softly, or omit the latter vowel entirely.

Pyojuneo	Jeolla
육학년 yoog-kak-nyeon	유각년 yoog-ag-nyeon
못해 mot-tae	모대 mo-dae

However, in the case of '모대(modae)', it is also observed in South Chungcheong Province and some areas of southern Gyeonggi Province close to South Chungcheong Province.

The rest is almost similar to the Chungcheong dialect.

=== Gyeongsang ===
Busan, Daegu, Ulsan, Gyeongsang region (South Korea)

- The Gyeongsang dialect is one of the best-known South Korean dialects, known not only by Koreans but also by foreigners interested in Korean culture.
- The Gyeongsang dialect is frequently characterized as the most "rough" and "macho" dialect of all South Korean dialects.
- The Gyeongsang dialect is one of the most common dialects employed in K-dramas.
- The Gyeongsang dialect exhibits internal diversity, with variations in pronunciation and vocabulary that are easily recognized by native speakers of the region.

Honorific

Pyojuneo	Gyeongsang
하십시오 hasibsio	하이소 haiso
하오 hao	하소 haso
해요 haeyo	해예 / 해요 haeye / haeyo

Ordinary way of speaking

- When forming questions, speakers primarily employ '노 (no)' and '나 (na)'. The choice between them reveals the nature of the inquiry. '나 (na)' functions as a marker for polar questions, demanding a straightforward 'yes' or 'no' response. In contrast, '노 (no)' is attached to questions requiring a more comprehensive explanation.
  - example: 1) "Have you eaten?" 2) "What did you eat?"

Pyojuneo	Gyeongsang
너 밥 먹었어? neo bab meog-eott-eo?	니 밥 뭇나? ni bab mutna?
뭐 먹었어? mwo meog-eoss-eo?	뭐 뭇노? mwo mutno?

- When talking, the sentence often ends with '~다 아이가(~da aiga)'.
  - example: "You said so."

Pyojuneo	Gyeongsang
네가 그렇게 말했잖아. nega geuleohge malhaettjanh-a.	니가 그레 말했다 아이가. niga geule malhaettda aiga.

- '~하다(~hada)' is pronounced as '~카다(~kada)'.
  - example: "Why are you doing that?"

Pyojuneo	Gyeongsang
왜 그렇게 하는 거야? wae geuleohge haneun geoya?	와 그 카는데? wa geu kaneunde?

The rest is almost similar to the Jeolla dialect.

=== Jeju ===
Jeju Island/Province (South Korea); sometimes classified as a separate language in the Koreanic language family

example: Hangul

- Pyojuneo: 한글 (Hangul)
- Jeju: ᄒᆞᆫ글 (Hongul)

Honorific

Pyojuneo	Jeju
하십시오 hasibsio	ᄒᆞᆸ서 hobseo
하오 hao	ᄒᆞᆸ소 hobso
해요 haeyo	ᄒᆞ여마씀 / 양 / 예 hobyeomasseum / yang / ye

== See also ==
- Koreanic languages
- Regions of Korea

== Bibliography ==
- Janhunen, Juha (1996), Manchuria: An Ethnic History, Finno-Ugrian Society, ISBN 978-951-9403-84-7.
- Lee, Iksop; Ramsey, S. Robert (2000), The Korean Language, SUNY Press, ISBN 978-0-7914-4831-1.
- Lee, Sean (2015), "A Sketch of Language History in the Korean Peninsula", PLOS ONE, 10 (5), e0128448, Bibcode:2015PLoSO..1028448L, doi:10.1371/journal.pone.0128448, PMC 4449120, PMID 26024377.
- National Geography Information Institute (2017), The National Atlas of Korea, Seoul: Ministry of Land Infrastructure and Transport.
- Ogura, Shinpei (1944), Chōsen-go hōgen no kenkyū 朝鮮語方言の研 [A Study of the Korean Dialects] (in Japanese), Tokyo: Iwanami Bunko. Volume 1: doi:10.11501/1869828. Volume 2: doi:10.11501/1869845.
- Yeon, Jaehoon (2012), "Korean dialects: a general survey", in Tranter, Nicolas (ed.), The Languages of Japan and Korea, Routledge, pp. 168–185, ISBN 978-0-415-46287-7. (preprint)
- Cho, Sungdai; Whitman, John (2020). Korean: A Linguistic Introduction. Cambridge University Press. ISBN 978-0-521-51485-9.
