= Eight Provinces of Korea =

Administrative divisions of Korea during the Joseon dynasty

Korean name
- Hangul: 팔도
- Hanja: 八道
- RR: paldo
- MR: p'alto

During most of the Joseon dynasty, Korea was divided into eight provinces (do; 도; 道). The eight provinces' boundaries remained unchanged for about 480 years from 1413 to 1895, and formed a geographic paradigm that is still reflected today in the Korean Peninsula's administrative divisions, dialects, and regional distinctions. The names of all eight provinces are still preserved today, in one form or another. These eight historical provinces form both North and South Korea, and are not to be confused with the modern provinces that make up North Korea or South Korea.

== History ==
=== Provinces before 1895 ===
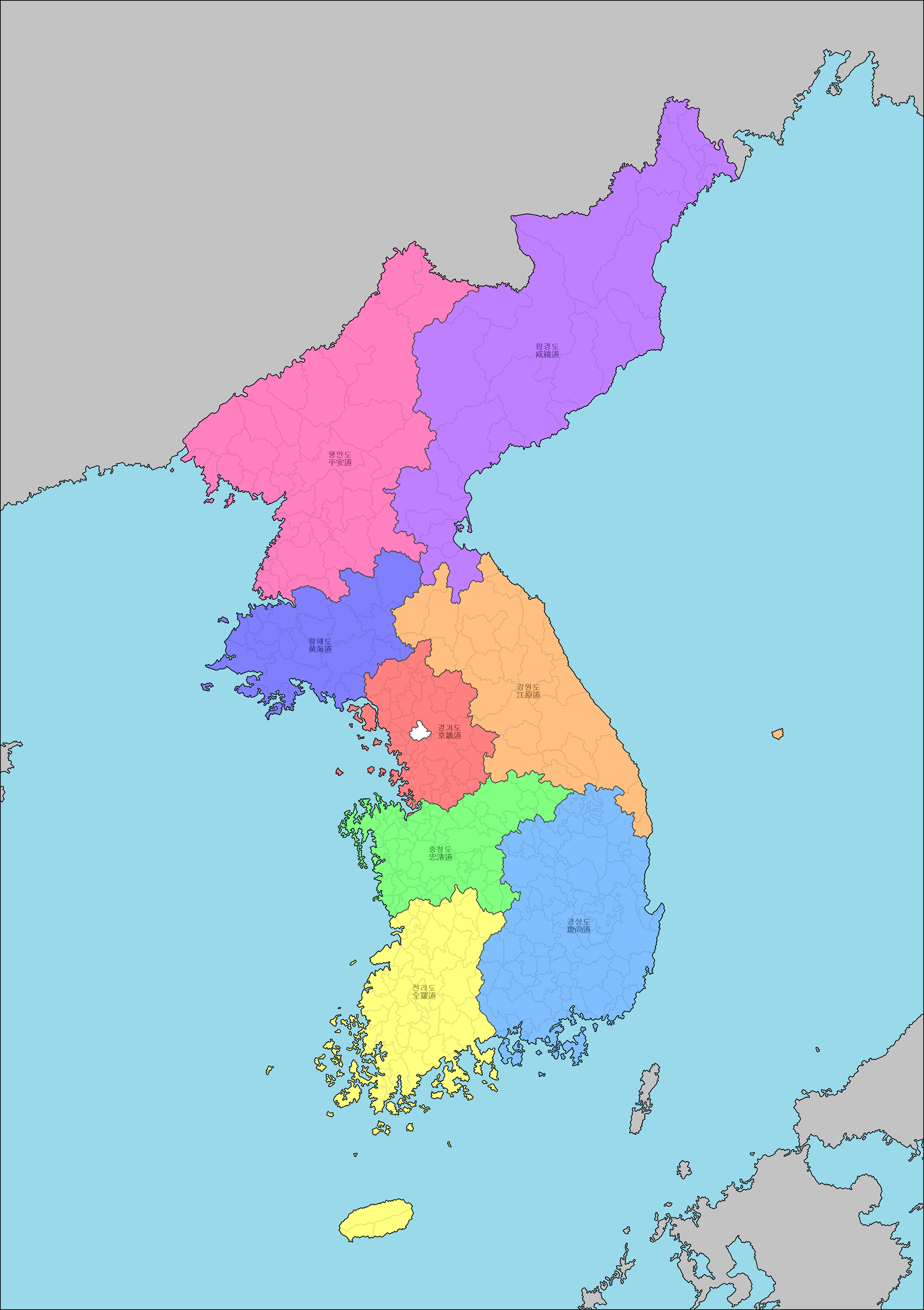
A map of the eight provinces of Joseon with their Korean names. Excluded and uncolored is Hanyang (한양; 漢陽, modern-day Seoul), the capital of Joseon.

In 1413 (the 13th year of the reign of King Jeongjong), the north-eastern boundary of Korea was extended to the Tumen River. The country was reorganized into eight provinces: Chungcheong, Gangwon, Gyeonggi, Gyeongsang, Jeolla, P'unghae (renamed Hwanghae in 1417), P'yŏngan, and Yŏnggil (eventually renamed Hamgyŏng in 1509).

=== Districts of 1895–96 ===
For almost 500 years, the eight-province system remained virtually unchanged. In 1895 (the 32nd year of the reign of King Gojong), the five-century-old provincial system was abolished. On May 26 of that year—as part of the Gabo Reform—the country was redivided into 23 districts, each named for the city or county that was its capital.

Each district name in the following list links to the article on the province from which the district was formed, and where more detailed information on the district is provided:

- Andong
- Chuncheon
- Chungju
- Daegu
- Dongnae
- Gangneung
- Gongju
- Haeju
- Hamhŭng
- Hanseong
- Hongju
- Incheon
- Jeju
- Jeonju
- Jinju
- Kaesŏng
- Kanggye
- Kapsan
- Kyŏngsŏng
- Naju
- Namwon
- P'yŏngyang
- Ŭiju

=== Restored provinces of 1896 ===
The new system of districts did not last long, however, as one year later, on August 4, 1896, the former eight provinces were restored, with five of them (Chungcheong, Gyeongsang, Jeolla, Hamgyŏng, and P'yŏngan), being divided into north and south halves, to form a total of 13 provinces. This structure remained unchanged through the entire lifetime of the Korean Empire (1897–1910) and the Japanese Colonial Period (1910–1945). Since the end of World War II and the division of Korea in 1945, special cities and administrative regions and a handful of new provinces have been added in both the South and North.

== Cultural significance ==
The boundaries between the eight provinces for the most part followed rivers, mountain chains, and other natural boundaries, and consequently corresponded closely to dialect and cultural divisions. Due to the correspondence between provincial boundaries and Korean geography, most provincial boundaries and names have mostly survived to the present day; most Koreans are keenly aware of the regional and dialect distinctions that still exist.

For example, a regional rivalry (akin to that between the Northeast United States and Southern United States) exists between Gyeongsang and Jeolla residents (Gyeongsang and Jeolla mostly corresponding to the ancient kingdoms of Silla and Baekje respectively) due to historic, social, economic, and political differences, some of which have continued into the present day in more muted form. Most of the traditional provinces also had alternative regional names which are still used today (especially Honam, Yeongdong, and Yeongnam) informally if not on paper.

== Modern-day usage ==
The term Paldo ("Eight Provinces") is itself often used as a shorthand to denote Korea as a whole, or to describe the traditional folk culture of Korea's regions. Thus, one sometimes finds such expressions as:

- Paldo kimchi in reference to the many varieties of kimchi unique to particular regions of Korea;
- Paldo Arirang to denote the hundreds of regional versions of the popular folk song Arirang; and
- Paldo sori to broadly refer to the diversity of folk music (sori; "sounds") across Korea.

Cf. the four Provinces of Ireland—where reference to the ancient provinces is used to talk of the entire island of Ireland.

== Names ==
Except Gyeonggi (see note (Note: The province's name literally means "area within a 500-li (200-km) radius" (gi; 畿) of the "capital" (Gyeong; 京), referring to the royal capital Hanseong (modern-day Seoul). The regional name "Gijeon" is obsolete. The 20th-century term "Sudogwon" ("Capital Region") is used today to denote the Seoul-Incheon conurbation and that part of Gyeonggi Province that forms part of the same built-up, urban area.) below), each province took its name from the initial Hanja (Sino-Korean characters) of two of its principal cities. The origin of each province's name is detailed in the table below.

== Table of provinces ==
The table below lists the eight provinces in romanized spelling, Hangul and Hanja; the origin of their names; their capitals, dialects, and regional names; and the 13 provinces that replaced them in 1896. (The capitals and regional names are as of the mid 19th century. Since they were not official, other regional names were also used, but the ones in the table are the most widely used or representative.)

Province	Hangul	Hanja	Name Origin	Capital	Regional Name	Dialect	Post-1896 Provinces	Present Provincial divisions
Chungcheong	충청도	忠淸道	Chungju + Cheongju	Gongju	Hoseo (Note: Pronounced "Ho-suh," not "Ho-zay-oh," as the spelling might suggest.)	Chungcheong Dialect	North Chungcheong; South Chungcheong	North Chungcheong Province; South Chungcheong Province; Daejeon Metropolitan City; Sejong Metropolitan Autonomous City
Gangwon	강원도	江原道	Gangneung + Wonju	Wonju	Gwandong (Yeongseo, Yeongdong) (Note: "Gwandong" is the name for the region as a whole, with "Yeongseo" denoting the western half of the province and "Yeongdong" the eastern half. "Yeongdong" is used more often than either of the other two terms, however, especially in reference to railway and road arteries that cross through Gangwon, connecting the Seoul and Yeongdong regions.)	Gangwon Dialect	Gangwon	Gangwon Province (SK); Kangwŏn Province (NK)
Gyeonggi	경기도	京畿道	Hanseong (Seoul)	Gyeonggi	Gyeonggi	Seoul Dialect	Gyeonggi Province; Seoul Special City; Incheon Metropolitan City (parts); North Hwanghae Province (parts)	
Gyeongsang	경상도	慶尙道	Gyeongju + Sangju	Daegu	Yeongnam	Gyeongsang Dialect	North Gyeongsang; South Gyeongsang	North Gyeongsang Province; South Gyeongsang Province; Busan Metropolitan City; Daegu Metropolitan City; Ulsan Metropolitan City
Hamgyŏng	함경도	咸鏡道	Hamhŭng + Kyŏngsŏng	Hamhŭng	Kwanbuk (Kwanbuk, Kwannam) (Note: "Kwanbuk" was used to designate either the province as whole, or only the northern part thereof. In the latter case, "Kwannam" was then used to denote the southern part of the province.)	Hamgyŏng Dialect	North Hamgyŏng; South Hamgyŏng	North Hamgyong Province; South Hamgyong Province; Ryanggang Province (parts); Rasŏn Special City; Kangwŏn Province (NK) (parts)
Hwanghae	황해도	黃海道	Hwangju + Haeju	Haeju	Haesŏ	Hwanghae Dialect	Hwanghae (Note: The modern-day division of the province into North and South did not occur until 1954.)	North Hwanghae Province; South Hwanghae Province; Incheon Metropolitan City (parts)
Jeolla	전라도	全羅道	Jeonju + Naju (Note: The initial "n" in "Naju" is pronounced as "l" (lower-case "L") when it comes after another consonant; the final "n" in the "Jeon" of "Jeonju" is then assimilated to an "l" sound.)	Jeonju	Honam	Jeolla Dialect; Jeju Dialect (Note: The distinctive Jeju Dialect is used on Jeju Island, which became a separate province in 1946.)	North Jeolla; South Jeolla; Jeju	North Jeolla Province; South Jeolla Province; Jeju Special Self-Governing Province; Gwangju Metropolitan City
P'yŏngan	평안도	平安道	P'yŏngyang + Anju	P'yŏngyang	Kwansŏ	P'yŏngan Dialect	North P'yŏngan; South P'yŏngan	North P'yŏngan; South P'yŏngan; Chagang Province; Ryanggang Province (parts); P'yŏngyang Direct-Administered City; Namp'o Special City

== See also ==
- Administrative divisions of North Korea
- Administrative divisions of South Korea
- Korean dialects
- Provinces of Korea
- Regions of Korea
- Special cities of North Korea
- Special cities of South Korea
- For comparison, see:
  - Provinces of China
  - Provinces of France
  - Provinces of Ireland
  - Provinces of Japan
  - Provinces of Vietnam
