= Chungcheong Province =

Historical province of Korea

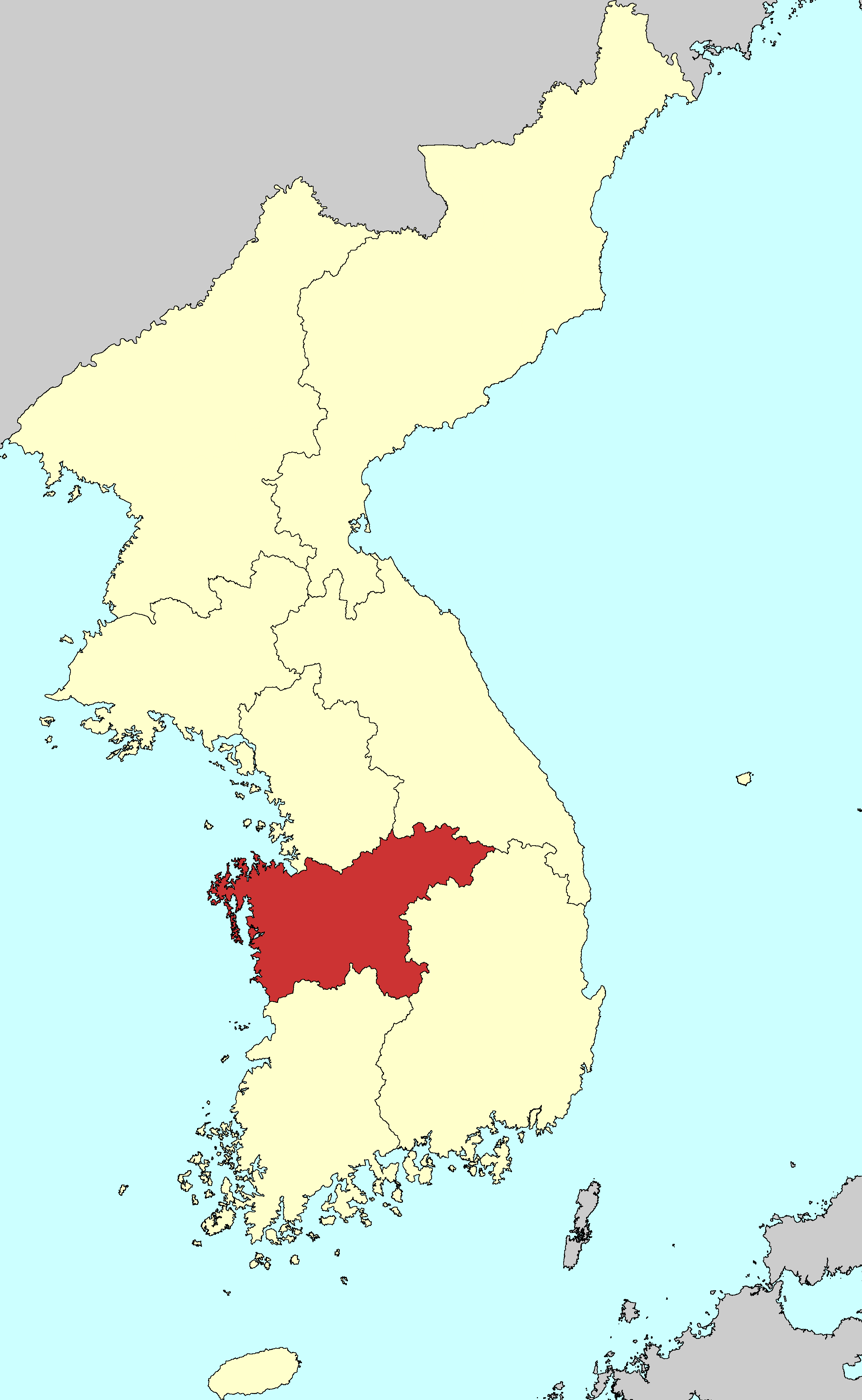
- Country: Joseon
- Region: Hoseo
- Capital: Gongju
- Dialect: Chungcheong

Korean name
- Hangul: 충청도
- Hanja: 忠淸道
- RR: Chungcheong-do
- MR: Ch'ungch'ŏng-do

Chungcheong Province (Korean: 충청도; Hanja: 忠淸道; Korean pronunciation: [tɕʰuŋ.tɕʰʌ̹ŋ.do̞]) was one of the eight provinces of Korea during the Joseon Dynasty. Chungcheong was located in the southwest of Korea. The provincial capital was located at Gongju, which had been the capital of the kingdom of Baekje from 475 to 538.

== History ==
Chungcheong Province was formed in 1356—during the Goryeo Dynasty—from the southern portion of the former province of Yanggwang. Its name derived from the names of the principal cities of Chungju (충주; 忠州) and Cheongju (청주; 淸州).

In 1895, the province was replaced by the Districts of Chungju (Chungju-bu; 충주부; 忠州府) in the east, Gongju (Gongju-bu; 공주부; 公州府) in the centre, and Hongju (Hongju-bu; 홍주부; 洪州府; modern-day Hongseong County) in the west.

In 1896, Chungju and eastern Gongju Districts were reorganized into North Chungcheong Province, and Hongju and western Gongju Districts were reorganized into South Chungcheong Province. North and South Chungcheong are today part of South Korea.

== Geography ==
Historic Chungcheong was bordered on the north by Gyeonggi Province, on the north east by Gangwon, the east by Gyeongsang Provinces, on the south by North Jeolla Province, and on the west by the Yellow Sea. The region is mountainous in the east (the North province) and somewhat lower and flatter in the west (the South province).

The regional name for Chungcheong is Hoseo (호서; 湖西), although this name is used less than the current administrative name.

Apart from Cheongju, Chungju, and Gongju, other large or notable cities in the modern-day Chungcheong region include Daejeon, Cheonan and Janghang.

== Transportation and communication ==
Historically, almost all transportation and communication routes between Seoul and the southern Honam (Jeolla) and Yeongnam (Gyeongsang) regions have gone through the Chungcheong region, and today Daejeon—the region's largest city—is a major railway and freeway junction.
