= Changdo County =

Ch'angdo County 창도군
- County

Korean transcription(s)
  - Chosŏn'gŭl: 창도군
  - Hancha: 昌道郡
  - McCune-Reischauer: Ch'angdo-gun
  - Revised Romanization: Changdo-gun
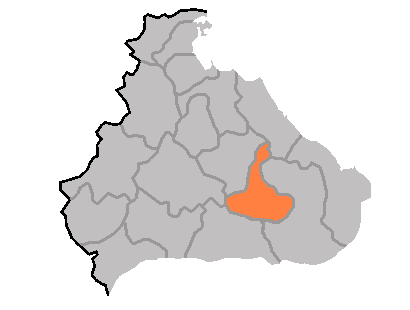
- Map of Kangwon showing the location of Changdo
- Country: North Korea
- Province: Kangwŏn Province
- Administrative divisions: 1 ŭp, 16 ri

Area
  - Total: 696 km^{2} (269 sq mi)

Population (2008)
  - Total: 51,319
  - Density: 73.7/km^{2} (191/sq mi)

Ch'angdo County is a kun, or county, in Kangwŏn province, North Korea. Originally part of Kimhwa, it was split off as a separate county in 1952.

== Geography ==
Ch'angdo lies to the west of the Taebaek Mountains, in the Ryŏngsŏ region of Kangwŏn, but is nonetheless quite rugged. The highest point is Okpatpong (옥밭봉), 1240 m above sea level. Ch'angdo lies just north of the Korean Demilitarized Zone. The chief stream is the Pukhan River, which flows southward across the DMZ into South Korea. Roughly 80% of the county's area is forestland.

== Administrative divisions ==
Ch'angdo county is divided into 1 ŭp (town) and 16 ri (villages):

- Ch'angdo-ŭp
- Changhyŏl-li
- Chisŏng-ri
- Ch'ujŏl-li
- Koksal-li
- Kŭmsal-li
- Kuryong-ri
- Kyoju-ri
- Myŏng'u-ri
- P'angyo-ri
- Sadong-ri
- Sanwŏl-li
- Sinsŏng-ri
- Sŏngdo-ri
- Songp'o-ri
- Taebaeng-ri
- Tangsal-li

== Economy ==
The chief local industry is agriculture, including sericulture and livestock farming. Lumbermills have also been developed, but there is little other industry. There are deposits of copper, zinc, nickel, and lead.

== Transportation ==
Ch'angdo is connected to the rest of North Korea by road, but not by rail. Google Earth imagery from 2017 shows a newly constructed emergency highway landing strip for aircraft and is equipped with two aircraft parking revetments located to the north of Changdo city.

== See also ==
- Geography of North Korea
- Administrative divisions of North Korea
- Kangwon (North Korea)
