= Pyongan Province =

Historical province of Korea

Korean transcription(s)
  - Chosŏn'gŭl: 평안도
  - Hanja: 平安道
  - Revised Romanization: Pyeongan-do
  - McCune–Reischauer: P'yŏngan-do
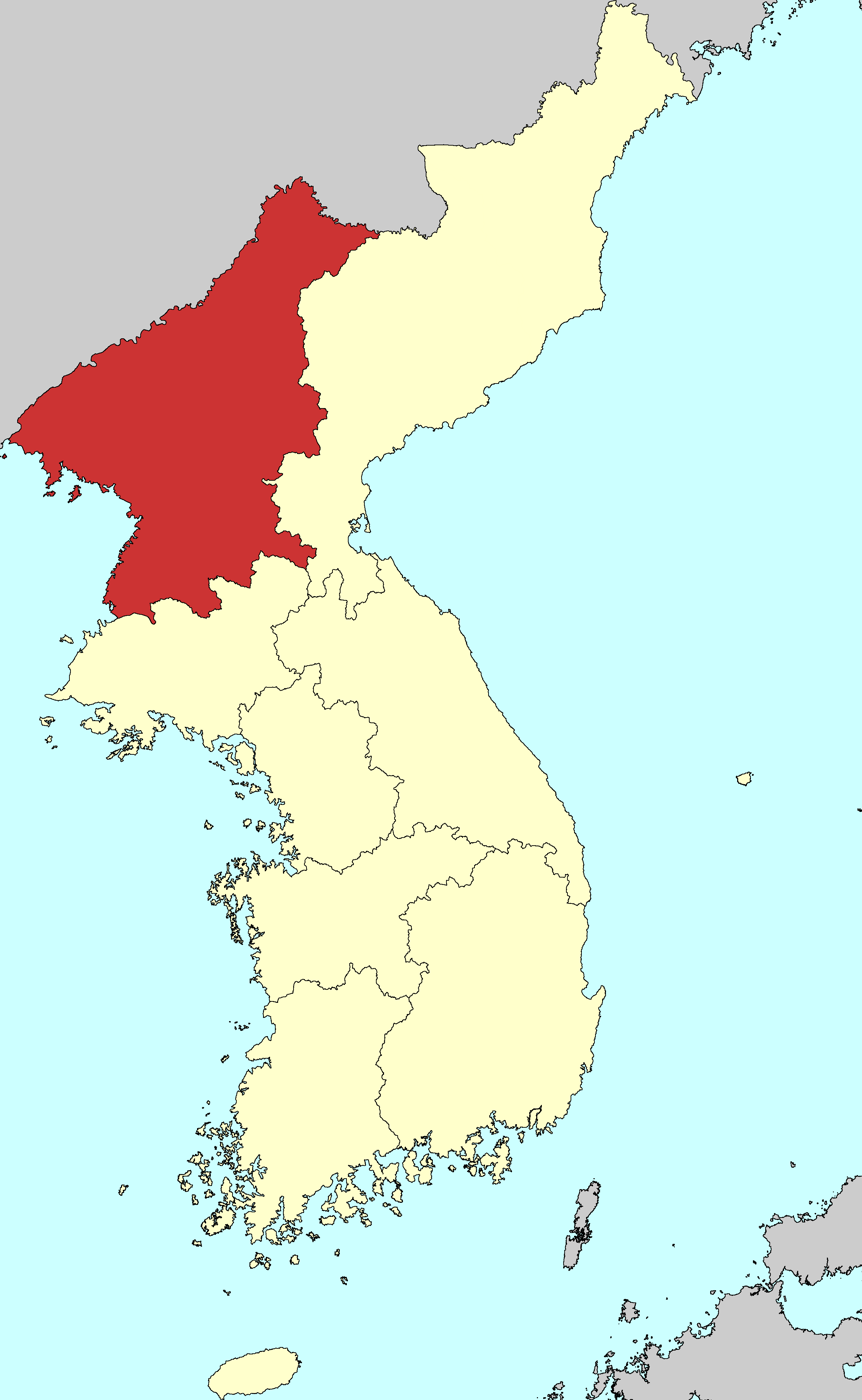
- Country: Joseon
- Region: Gwanseo
- Capital: Pyongyang

Government
  - Type: Province
- Dialect: Pyeongan

Pyongan Province (Korean: 평안도; Hanja: 平安道; IPA: [pʰjʌŋando]) was one of Eight Provinces of Korea during the Joseon dynasty. Pyongan was located in the northwest of Korea. The provincial capital was Pyongyang.

== History ==
Pyongan Province was formed in 1413. Its name derived from the names of two of its principal cities, Pyongyang (평양; 平壤) and Anju (안주; 安州).

In 1895, the province was replaced by the Districts of Ganggye (강계부; 江界府) in the northeast, Uiju County (의주부; 義州府) in the northwest, and Pyongyang (평양부; 平壤府) in the south.

In 1896, Kanggye and Ŭiju Districts were reorganized into North Pyongan Province, and Pyongyang District was reorganized as South Pyongan Province. North and South Pyongan Provinces are part of North Korea.

== Geography ==
Pyongan was bounded on the east by Hamgyong Province, on the south by Hwanghae Province, on the west by the Yellow Sea, and on the north by Qing China.

The regional name for the province was Kwanso.
