= Gwandong =

Region of Korea

Coordinates: 37°30′N 128°15′E

- Hangul: 관동
- Hanja: 關東
- RR: Gwandong
- MR: Kwandong

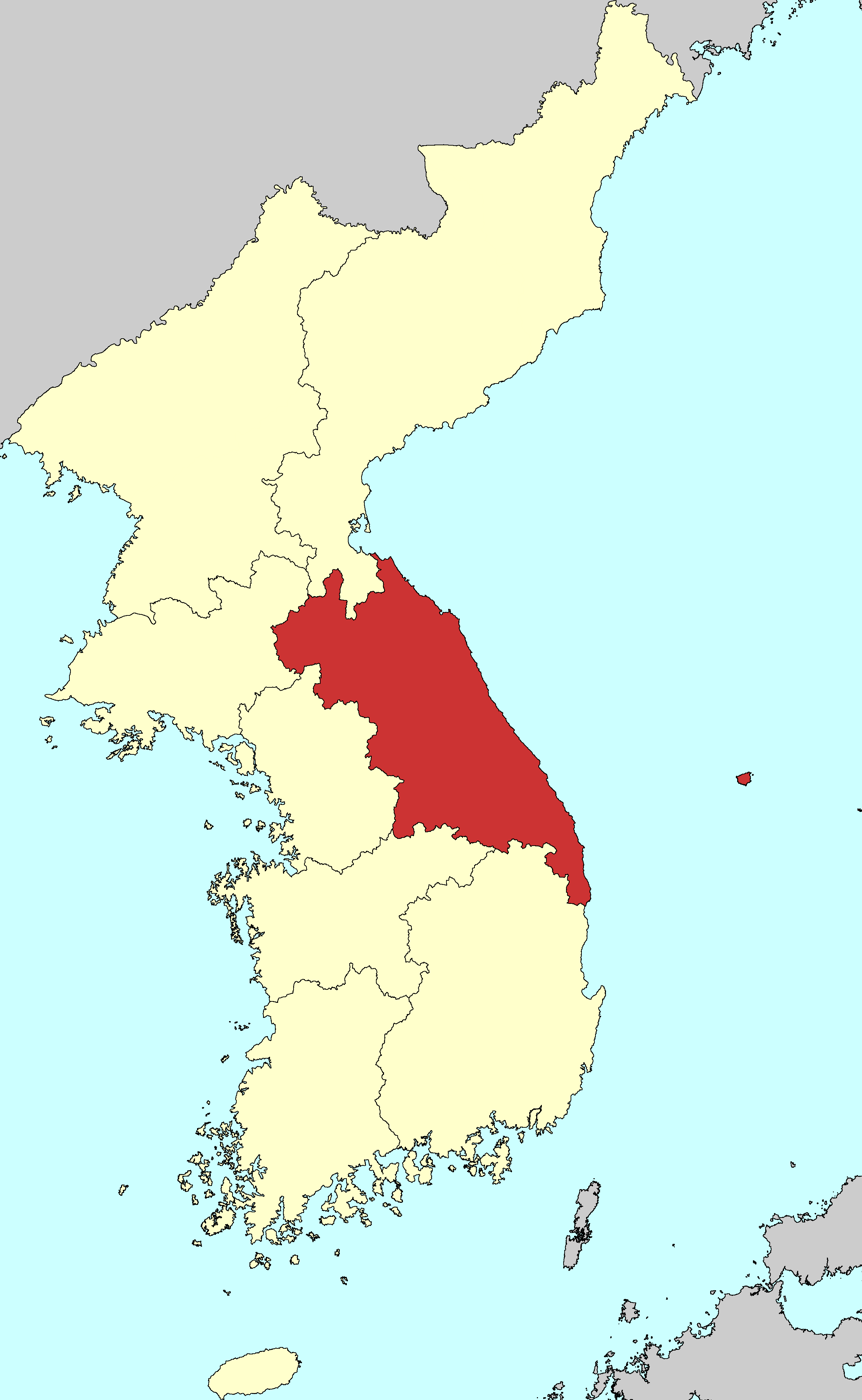
Map of Gangwon Province in Joseon Dynasty, which roughly corresponding to the region of Gwandong

Gwandong (관동; Korean pronunciation: [kwan.doŋ]) is a historical region corresponding to the former Gangwon Province of Korea. Today, the term generally refers to South Korea's Gangwon Province and North Korea's Kangwon Province. Gwandong is also commonly used to denote people from this region.

The term literally means "east of Daegwallyeong", a mountain pass in the Taebaek Mountains on the eastern Korean peninsula.

This region is traditionally divided into Yeongseo and Yeongdong by the Taebaek Mountains.

== See also ==
- Kanto, same term in Japanese
- Guandong, same term in Chinese
