= Gangwon Province, South Korea =

Gangwon State Gangwon Province
- Special Self-Governing Province
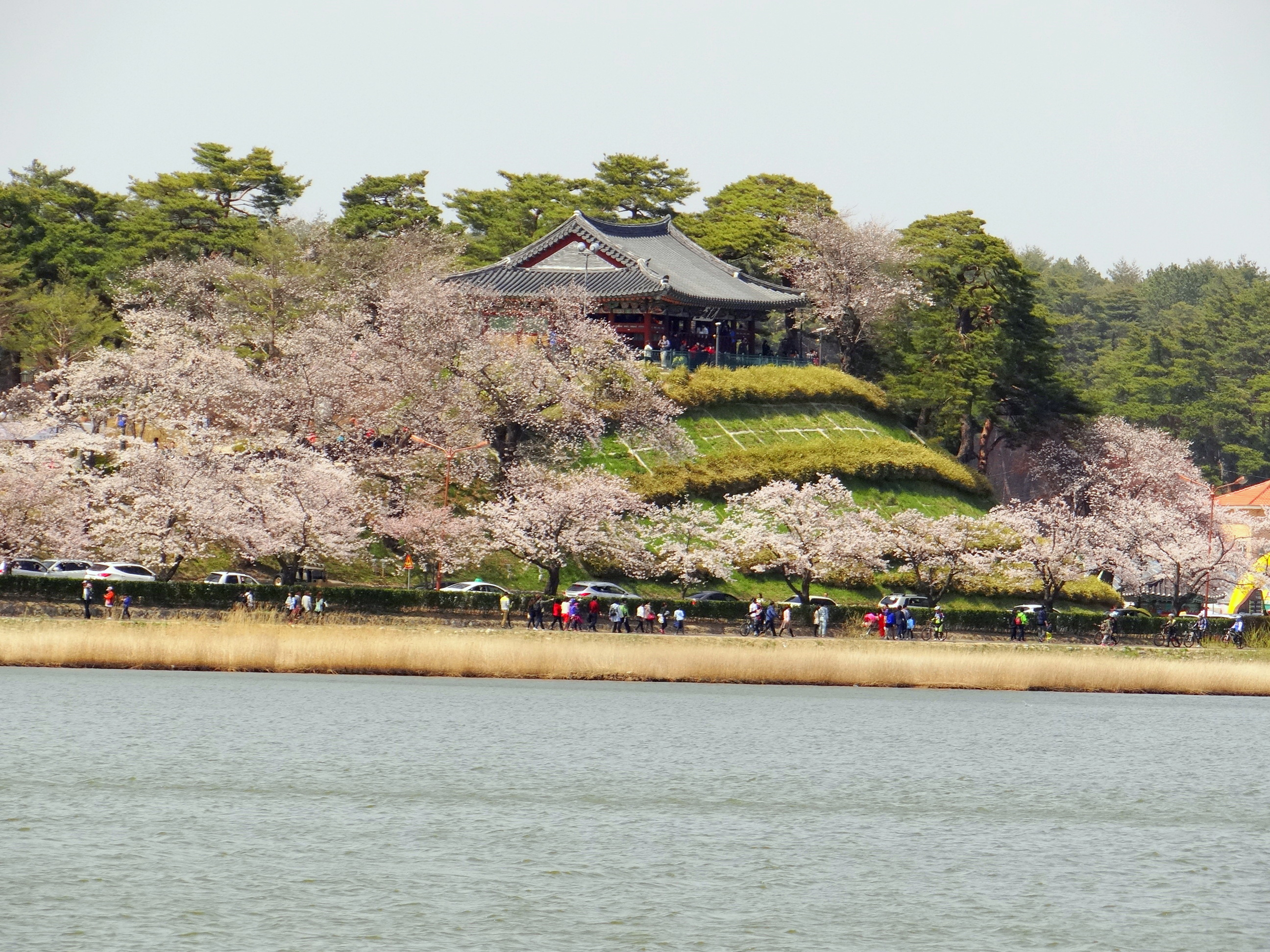
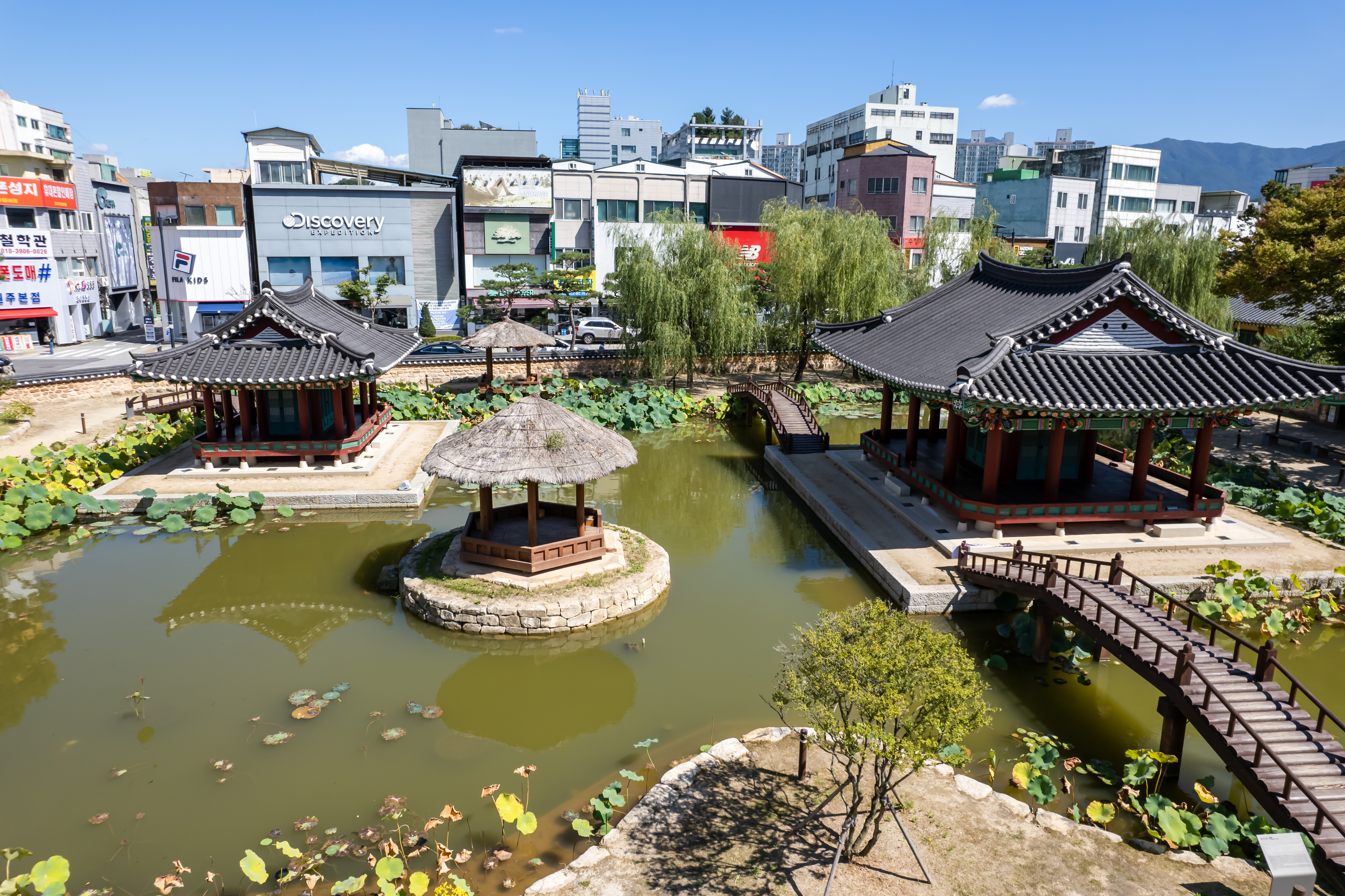
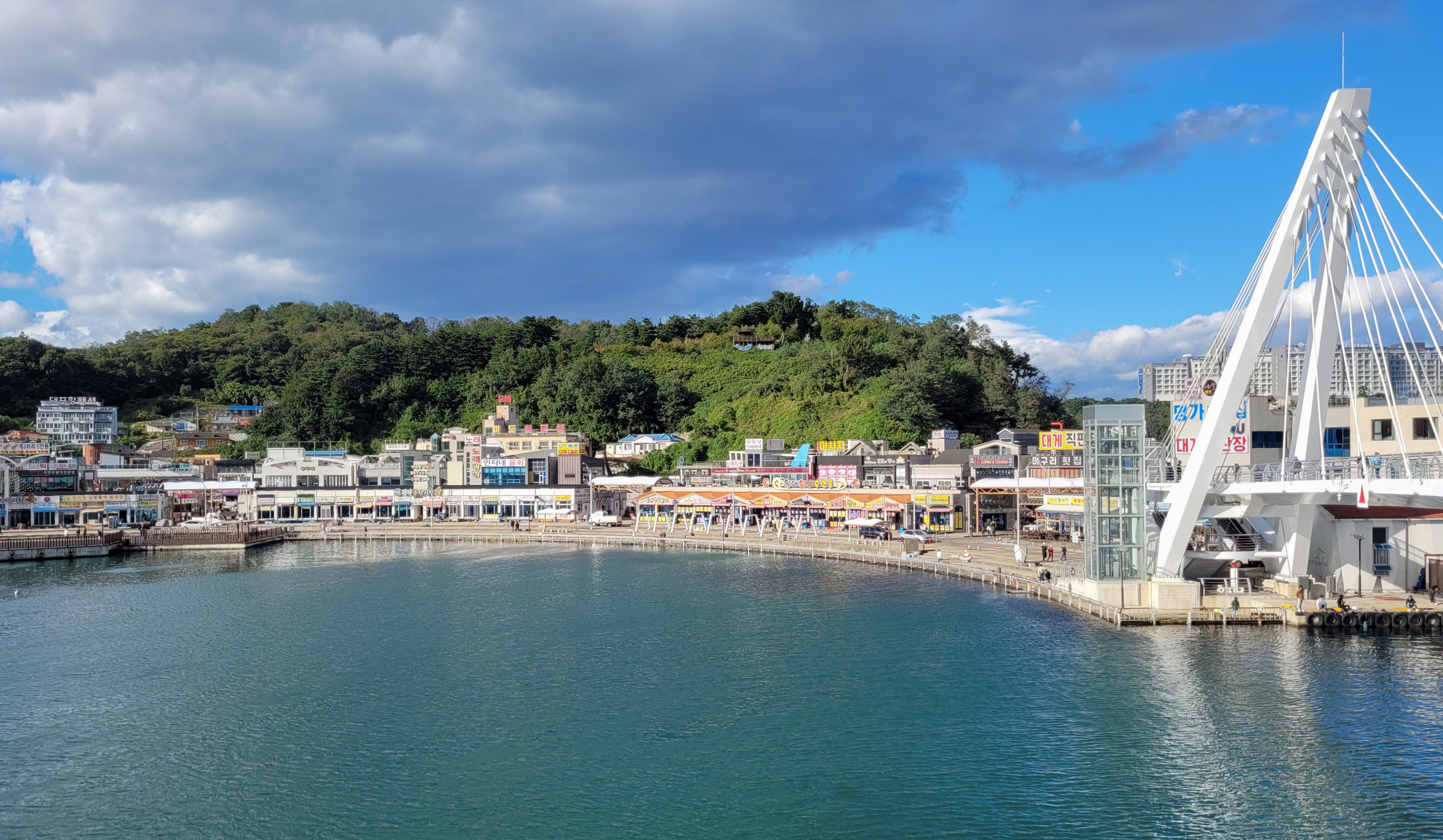
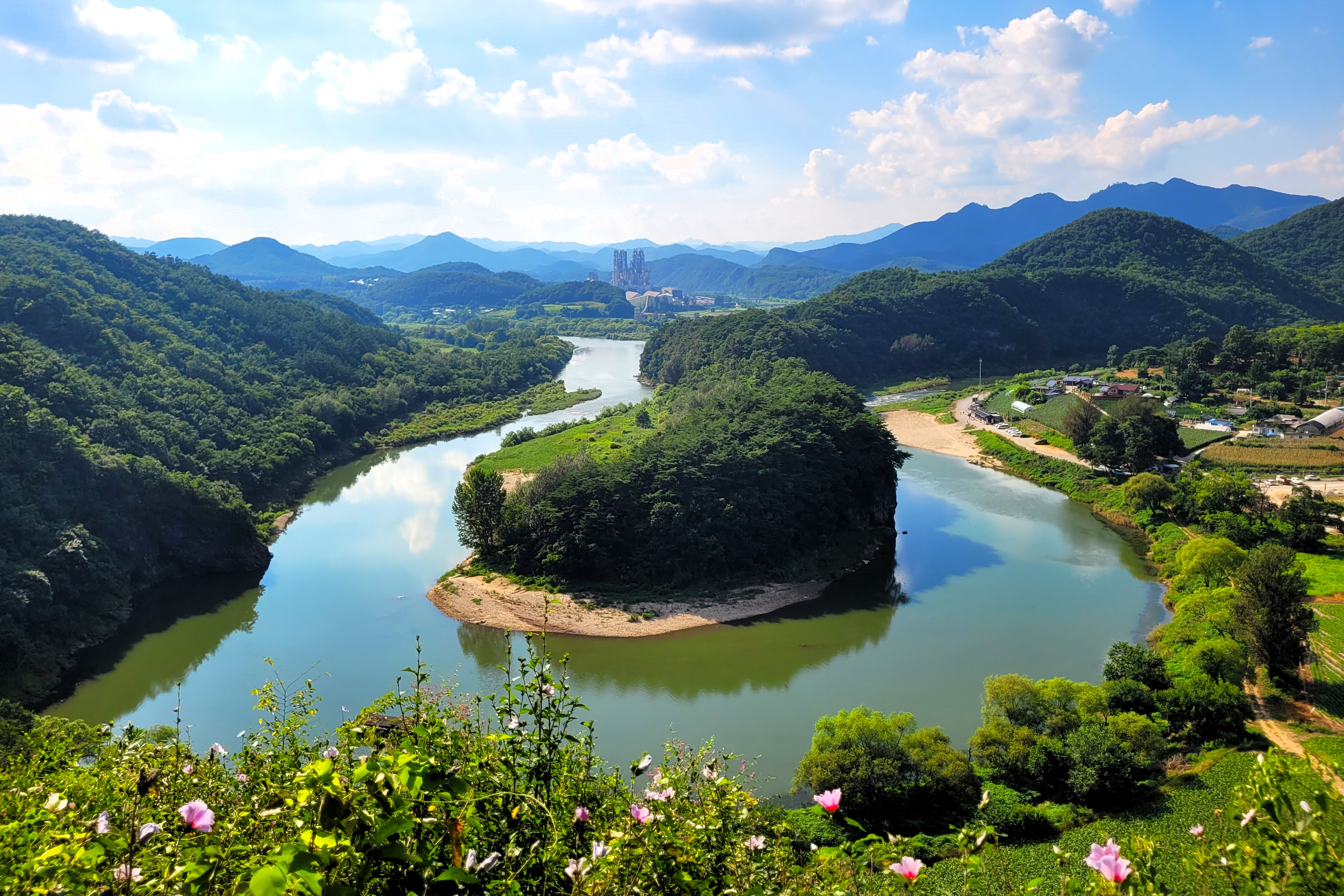
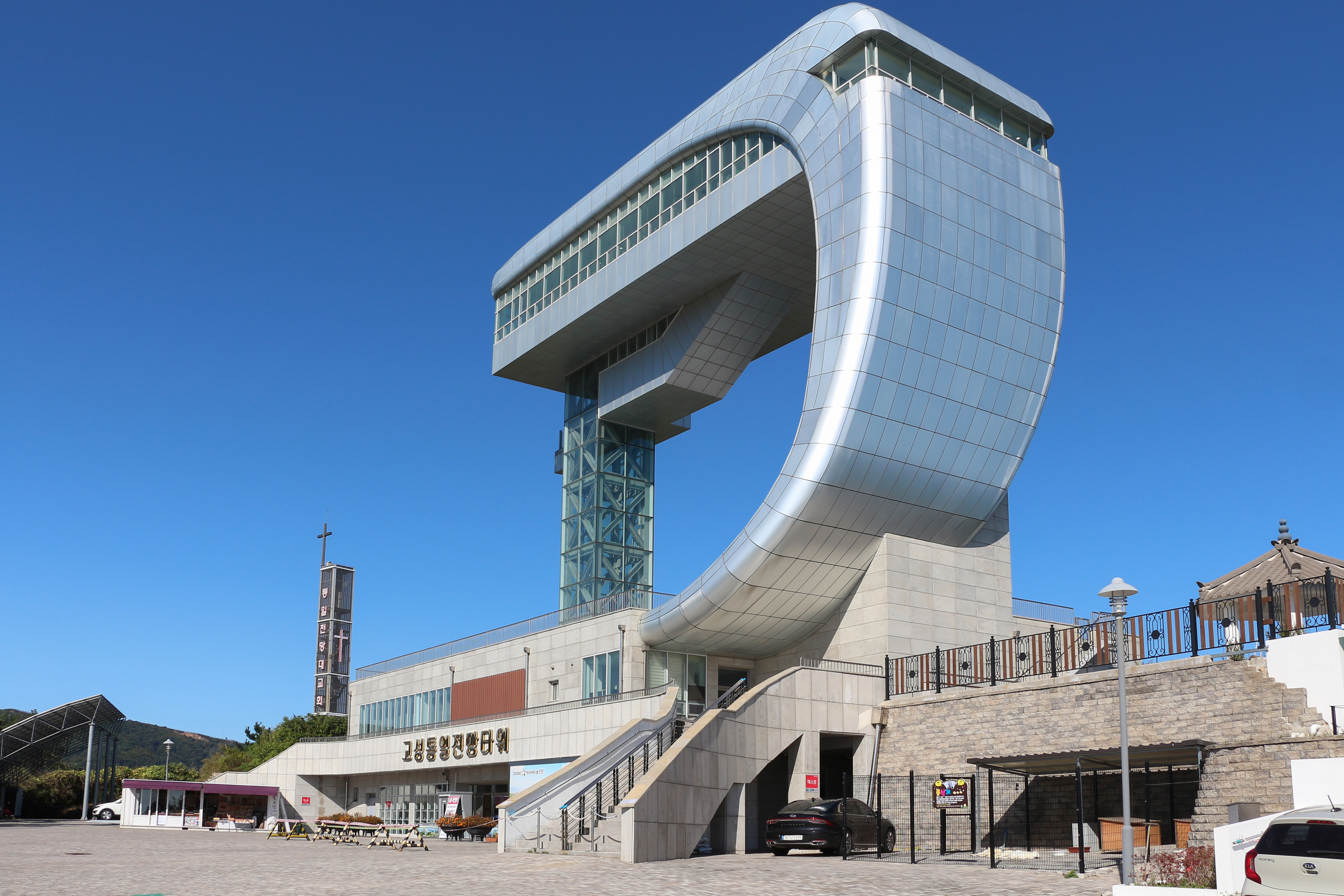
- From the left: Gangneung, Wonju, Sokcho, Yeongwol, and Goseong

- Flag Logo

- Coordinates: 37°30′N 128°15′E
- Country: South Korea
- Region: Gwandong (Yeongseo: western Gangwon; Yeongdong: eastern Gangwon)
- Largest city: Wonju
- Capital: Chuncheon
- Subdivisions: 7 cities; 11 counties

Government
  - Governor: Woo Sang-ho (Democratic)

Area
  - Total: 16,875 km^{2} (6,515 sq mi)

Population (October, 2022)
  - Total: 1,537,339
  - Density: 91/km^{2} (240/sq mi)

Metropolitan Symbols
  - Flower: Royal azalea
  - Tree: Korean pine
  - Bird: Red-crowned crane

GDP (Nominal, 2023)
  - Total: KRW 62 trillion (US$ 50 billion)
  - Per capita: US$ 34,426
- ISO 3166 code: KR-42
- Dialect: Gangwon (Yeongseo: western Gangwon dialect; Yeongdong: eastern Gangwon dialect)
- Website: Official website (English)

Korean name
- Hangul: 강원특별자치도
- Hanja: 江原特別自治道
- RR: Gangwon-teukbyeoljachido
- MR: Kangwŏn-t'ŭkpyŏljach'ido

Gangwon Province (Korean: 강원도), officially Gangwon State (Note: In June 2023 the area became a Special Self-Governing Province and changed its official English name to Gangwon State, however Gangwon Province remains in common and colloquial use.) (강원특별자치도; lit. 'Gangwon Special Self-Governing Province'), is a Special Self-Governing Province of South Korea. It is known as the largest and least densely populated subdivision of South Korea. Gangwon is one of the three provinces in South Korea with special self-governing status, the others being Jeju Province and Jeonbuk State. Gangwon is bordered on the east by the East Sea, it borders Gyeonggi Province to the west, North Gyeongsang Province and North Chungcheong Province to the south, and the Military Demarcation Line to the north, separating it from North Korea. In the 1945 division of Korea, the historical Gangwon Province was divided in half, and remains so to this day.

Pyeongchang County in Gangwon hosted the 2018 Winter Olympics and 2018 Winter Paralympics. Gangwon also hosted the 2024 Winter Youth Olympics.

== History ==
Gangwon Province was one of the Eight Provinces of Korea during the Joseon period, formed in 1395, deriving its name from the names of the principal cities of Gangneung (강릉; 江陵) and the provincial capital Wonju (원주; 原州).

In 1895 Gangwon Province was replaced by the Districts of Chuncheon (Chuncheon-bu; 춘천부; 春川府) in the west and Gangneung (Gangneung-bu; 강릉부; 江陵府) in the east, with Wonju becoming a part of Chungju District.

In 1896 Korea was re-divided into thirteen provinces, and the two districts were merged to re-form Gangwondo Province. Although Wonju re-joined Gangwon-do, the provincial capital was moved to Chuncheon, where it remains. During the Japanese rule of Korea, it was known as Kōgen-dō.

In 1945 Gangwon Province, along with the rest of Korea, was divided by the 38th parallel north in 1945, to create American and Soviet zones of occupation in the south and north respectively, leading to Wonsan joining the northern half in 1946 to serve as its administrative center. In 1948, the southern half of the province became part of the new South Korea. As a result of the Korean War Armistice Agreement of 1953, the boundary between the South and North Korean portions of the province was shifted north, to the Military Demarcation Line.

On June 11, 2023, Gangwon Province became a special self-governing province, and the official English name is Gangwon State. English names are not governed by national law, and each of the three special self-governing provinces uses different vocabulary.

== Geography ==
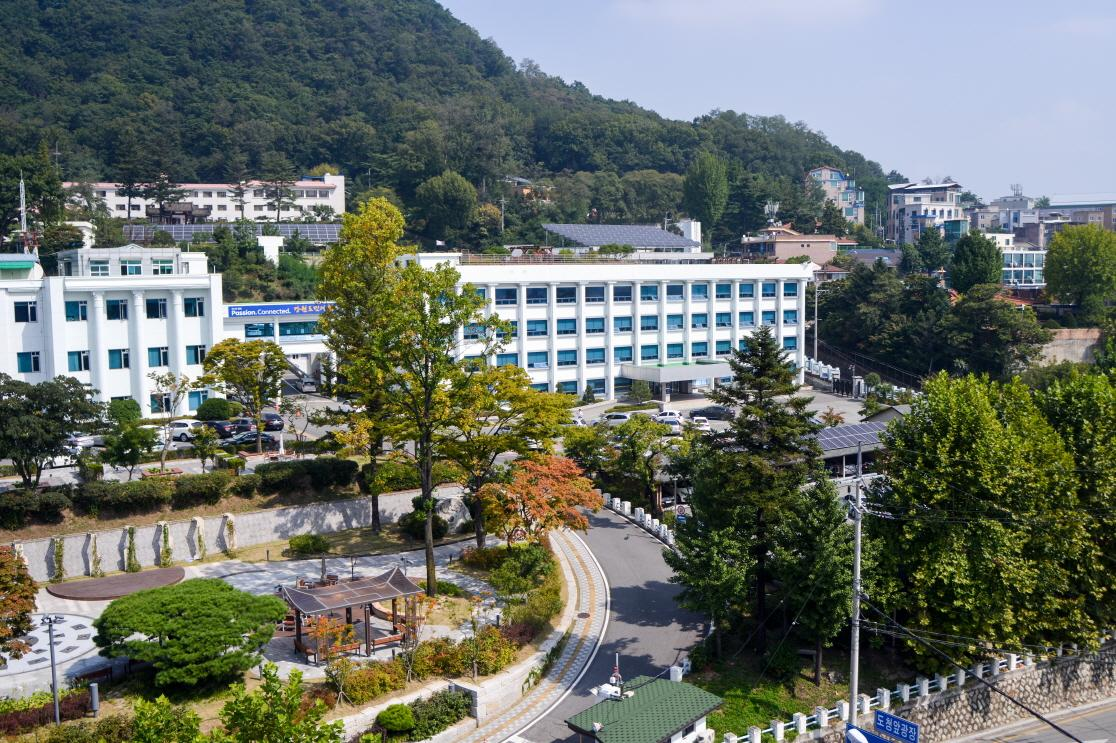
Gangwon Provincial Office in Chuncheon

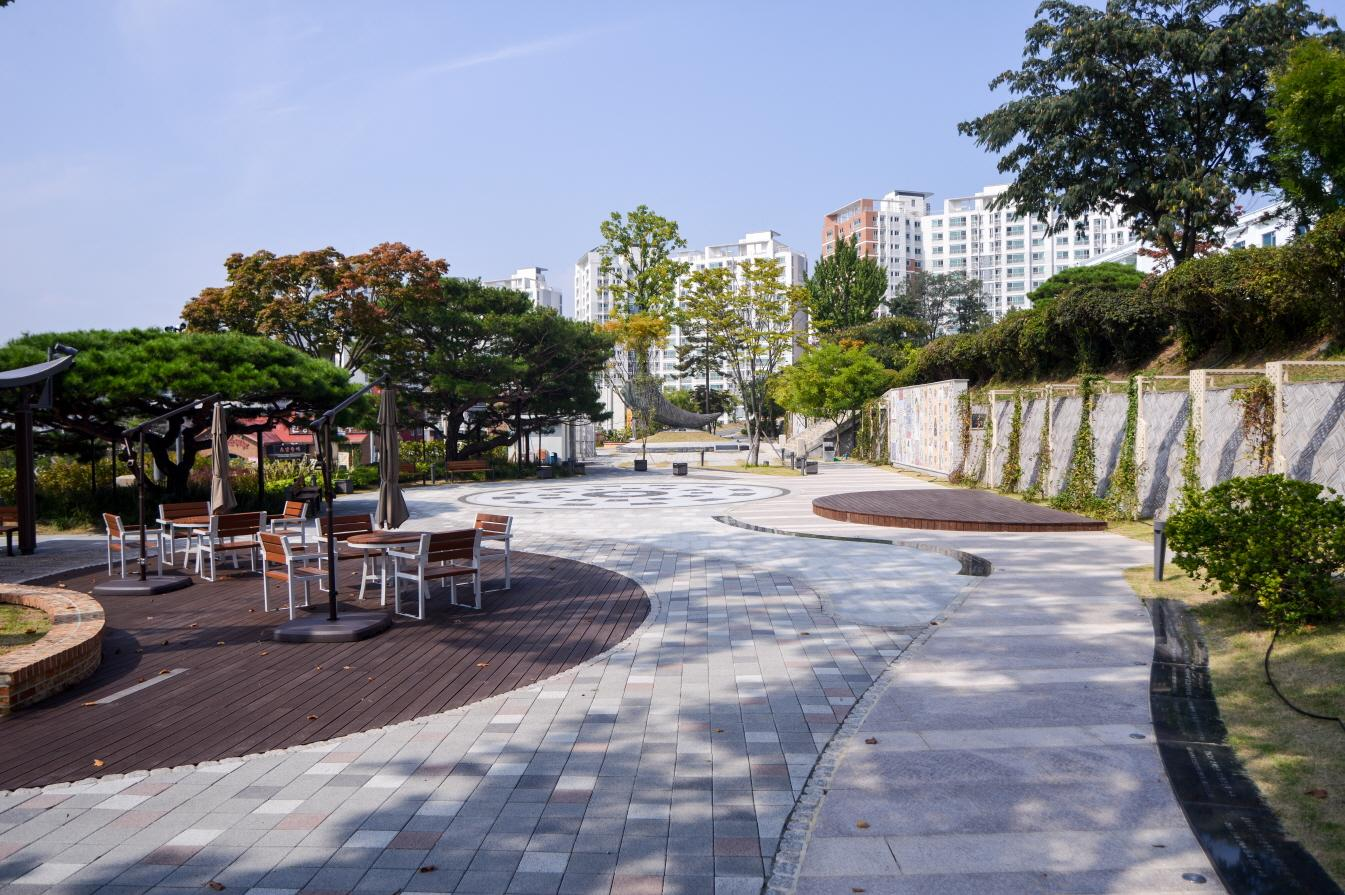
Park in Gangwon Provincial Office

=== Landscape ===
The State's landscape is dominated by the Taebaek Mountains (called Taebaek Sanmaek) which almost reaches the sea. As a consequence, much of the coast is steep and rocky.

=== Regions ===
Gangwon Province and its North Korean counterpart Kangwŏn are together referred to as the Gwandong region. The region west of the Taebaek Mountains is called Yeongseo, while the region east of the mountains is called Yeongdong. The term "Yeongdong" is frequently used in reference to transportation services from Seoul, meaning one might catch a bus or train on the Yeongdong Line, or drive to Gangneung on the Yeongdong Expressway.

=== Climate ===
Gangwon Province's Köppen climate classification's climate class is occasionally humid subtropical, because in some of its areas, especially in most of Yeongdong, it is Cfa, otherwise, its climate class is Hot-summer humid continental climate, because it is Dwb in some mountain areas, Dfa in eastern areas, Dfb in eastern mountain areas, and Dwa otherwise. The Taebaek Mountains create different climates in Yeongdong and Yeongseo.

The climate of Gangwon Province is influenced by its latitude. It has four seasons, with hot and humid summers, and cold, snowy winters. According to the Korea Meteorological Administration's data, average temperatures vary. In Yongdong, the average temperature is 11.0 °C (51.8 °F), and in Yeongseo, it is 10.8 °C (51.4 °F). All of the province's average temperatures range from 6.6 to 13.1 °C (43.9 to 55.6 °F). and the yearly amount of rainfall is 1,300–1,900 millimetres (51.2–74.8 in), concentrated on mountain areas, being one of the snowiest areas in South Korea.

=== Resources ===
The area of Gangwon Province in both North Korea and South Korea is 20,569 km^{2} (7,941.74 sq mi), with South Korea's Gangwon-do covering 16,874.59 km^{2} (6,515.32 sq mi). The province is renowned for its agricultural produce, especially potatoes and fish, including cuttlefish and pollock. Mineral resources from the province include iron, coal, fluorite, limestone and tungsten. There are some hydroelectric, thermoelectric power plants in the region. The coastline of Gangwon State features unique lagoons such as Gyeongpoho and Yeongrangho, which were formed by the development of sandbars blocking the mouths of bays. These geological features, along with the cold currents of the East Sea, have historically influenced the local fishing industry and ecosystem.

== Demographics ==
Historical population
Year	Pop.	±%
1930	1,473,972	—
1940	1,742,928	+18.2%
1949	1,138,435	−34.7%
1960	1,636,767	+43.8%
1970	1,837,015	+12.2%
1980	1,790,954	−2.5%
1990	1,580,430	−11.8%
2000	1,487,011	−5.9%
2010	1,471,513	−1.0%
2020	1,521,763	+3.4%

According to the 2015 census, 16.4% of the population follow Buddhism and 24.1% follow Christianity (17.5% Protestantism and 6.6% Catholicism). 58.7% of the population is not religious and 0.8% of the population follow other religions.

Religion in Gangwon (2024)
1. Not religious (52.0%)
2. Buddhism (19.0%)
3. Protestantism (17.0%)
4. Catholicism (11.0%)
5. Others (2.00%)

== Culture and heritage ==
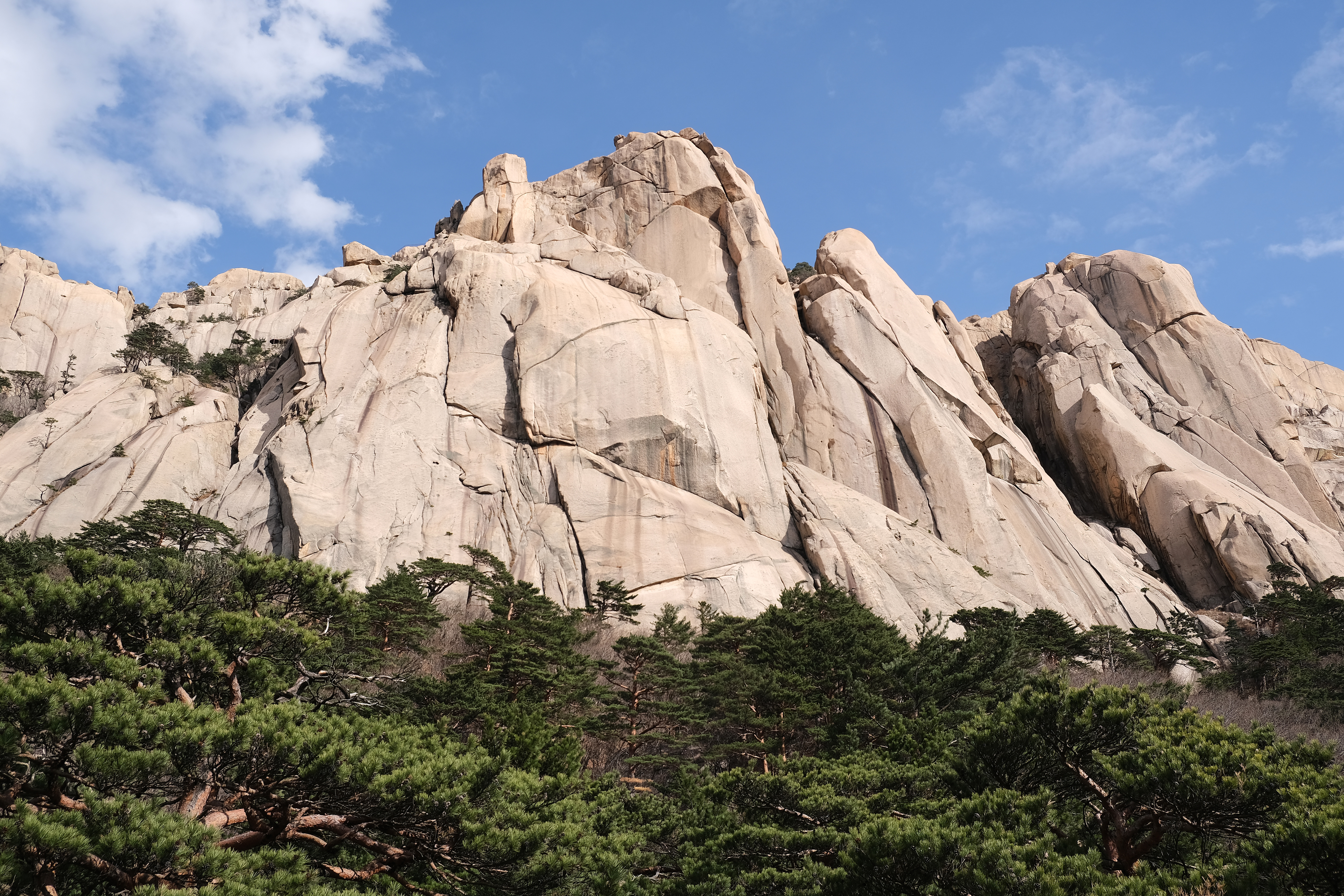
Ulsanbawi is one of the primary attractions of Seoraksan National Park.

=== Heritage ===
It is not known exactly when human settlement in what is now Gangwon Province began, but Paleolithic sites have been excavated.

Many historical artifacts are found in the region, like the Later Silla era's Bell of Sangwonsa, the North–South States Period era's Iron Seated Vairocana Buddha of Dopiansa Temple, the Goryeo era's Main Gate of Imyeonggwan Guesthouse, and the Joseon era's Documents of Sangwonsa Temple. Other popular historical areas, like Ojukheon are located in the region.

Because of Gangwon Province's landscape, a number of old Buddhist temples have survived, like Woljeongsa and Oseam.

=== Museums ===
Established in 2002, the Chuncheon National Museum is operated by the central government for the purpose of classification and reservation. The local government also has museums, including the Park Su-geun Art Museum, and the Taebaek Coal Museum. Purpose-built private museums, such as the ChamSori Gramophone Edison Museum are also operated.

=== Festivals ===
In Gangwon Province, almost all of the regions hold festivals. Gangneung Danoje was listed in UNESCO's Masterpieces of the Oral and Intangible Heritage of Humanity.

Geographically, Gangwon Province has several national parks as well as some natural monuments.

=== Food ===
Gangwon Province is composed of mountains or basins, so locals mainly make food with potatoes or buckwheat. All regions of the province have seasoned vegetable rice. For example, Jeongseon County is famous for Jeongseon thistle rice; Yeongwol County is famous for Yeongwol buckwheat rolls; Hwacheon County is famous for Hwacheon trout rice in a stone bowl and Hwacheon goatsbeard rice; and Yanggu County is famous for Yanggu dried green radish cuisine. In coastal regions, fish and salted seafood is consumed. For example, Donghae is famous for Donghae steamed fish; Sokcho is famous for Sokcho Squid Sausages; and Samcheok is famous for blowfish soup. These are normally very simple and easy to cook, like the province's traditional food.

=== Tourism ===
==== National Parks & Nature Monuments ====
Due to the Taebaek Mountains, Gangwon Province has 4 national parks & several natural monuments.

- Seoraksan National Park: Seoraksan National Park has rocky terrain around Daecheongbong, and was listed in the Man and the Biosphere Programme. The government designated the area as a nature reserve in 1965, and UNESCO designated it as a biosphere reserve in 1982. It was also the first Korean national park to be named under the National Park Law in 1970. It is popular with tourists and nature enthusiasts, and home to many rare flora and fauna making it valued for its floral diversity. The reserve spans 163.6 km^{2} (63.2 sq mi), and includes many mountain peaks measuring over 1,200 metres above sea level, the tallest being Daecheongbong, at an altitude of 1,708 metres. The ranges are composed largely of dissected granite and gneiss. There are about 1,013 species of plants known, with 822 vascular plant species. Pine trees such as the Siberian pine are abundant on the southern slopes whilst the northern slopes of the mountain range are characterized by oaks and other deciduous trees. Thuja grow in the deep valleys, dwarf pines and yews grow on low and high slopes. Juniper, hawthorn, forsythias, saw-worts and Manchurian fir can be found, with rare plants in the reserve including Hanabusaya asiatica. 1,562 animal species have been classified so far. including otters, the Siberian flying squirrel, kestrel, Chinese sparrowhawk, lenok, Chinese minnow, and the spotted barbel. Endangered animals include the Tristram's woodpecker, Korean goral, and Korean musk deer. Cultural landmarks in the reserve include the Buddhist temples Baekdamsa and Sinheungsa.
- Odaesan National Park: Odaesan is located in the center of Baekdudaegan, and it was assigned as a national park in 1975. Odaesan is one of the holy places of Korean Buddhist cultures.
- Chiaksan National Park: Chiaksan is derived from the southwest side of Odaesan, close to Wonju. In 2014, Wonju and the Korea National Park Service collaborated to make walking routes.
- Taebaeksan National Park: Taebaeksan is a traditional and historical "holy mountain," and it was assigned as a national park on October 22, 2016. Taebaeksan Mountain is located at the fork of Baekdudaegan Mountain Range, which starts from Bagdu into the south, heading to Jirisan Mountain. Ever since it has been designated as a provincial park, Taebaeksan Mountain has widened its realm and thus designated it as the 22nd national park. The park ranges from Gangwon Province to North Gyeongsang Province (Bongwha-gun) and spans 70.052 km^{2} (27.047 sq mi). There are various cultural assets in Taebaeksan Mountain including Cheonjaedan, a place where a harvest ceremony had been held for thousands of years, and Geomryeongso, the source of the Han River. It also has various and outstanding ecological landscapes including the biggest wildflower habitat in the country (Geumdaebong Peak to Daedeoksan Mountain), yew habitat around Janggunbong Peak, and Baekcheon Valley, the world's southernmost Lenok habitat.

The Hantaan River penetrates Cheorwon County's volcanic terrain, having several natural monuments. This area was a place of a fierce battle during the Korean War and is now a common rafting route. Around this river, the first Hantavirus hemorrhagic fever with renal syndrome virus, the Hantaan River virus, was found. The virus was named after the river. The Civilian Control Zone is near the Military Demarcation Line, providing areas to stay for migratory birds, especially red-crowned cranes. In the township of Haean, Yanggu, the Haean Basin is nicknamed Punchbowl, which was initially named by a war correspondent for the Korea War.

==== DMZ Museum ====
The museum has a large amount of English in its narration of the history of the DMZ, as well as exhibits such as United States POW letters and extensive amounts of photos. It is inside the Tongil Security Park.

=== Gangneung ===
Gangneung contains beaches connecting each other from north to south along the coast. These beaches are covered with pine tree forests, planted to block the sea breeze. Gangneung Coffee Street is built along the beach, and the Gangneung Coffee Festival is held every year.

=== Cheorwon County ===
==== The Second Tunnel ====
"Found in the DMZ" was found by Korean guards listening to the sound of explosions under the ground during their shift. After determined excavation on March 19, 1975, "The Second Tunnel" was discovered. It was for a sudden raid by the North Korean Army into South Korea. The second tunnel is composed of a firm granitic layer, is 3.5 km in length, and various in depth from 50m-160m. About 1 km of it is nowadays open to visitors.

==== Woljeong-ri Station ====
Woljeong-ri station is a historical building in the DMZ at Cheorwon. The tourist attraction, which can only be visited on escorted security tours of the DMZ, is an abandoned train station on the northernmost end of Korail's Gyeongwon Line. Near the station there was a small yard where rail stock was stored or shunted before leaving for Wonsan, now in North Korea, along the former Gyeongwon Line. Behind the station building there is the wreck of a train, bombed during the Korean War, used by the North Korean army and bombed by U.N. forces. In 2012, it became a place where artists can meet and exhibit their works.

=== Sokcho ===
==== Goseong Unification Observatory Building ====
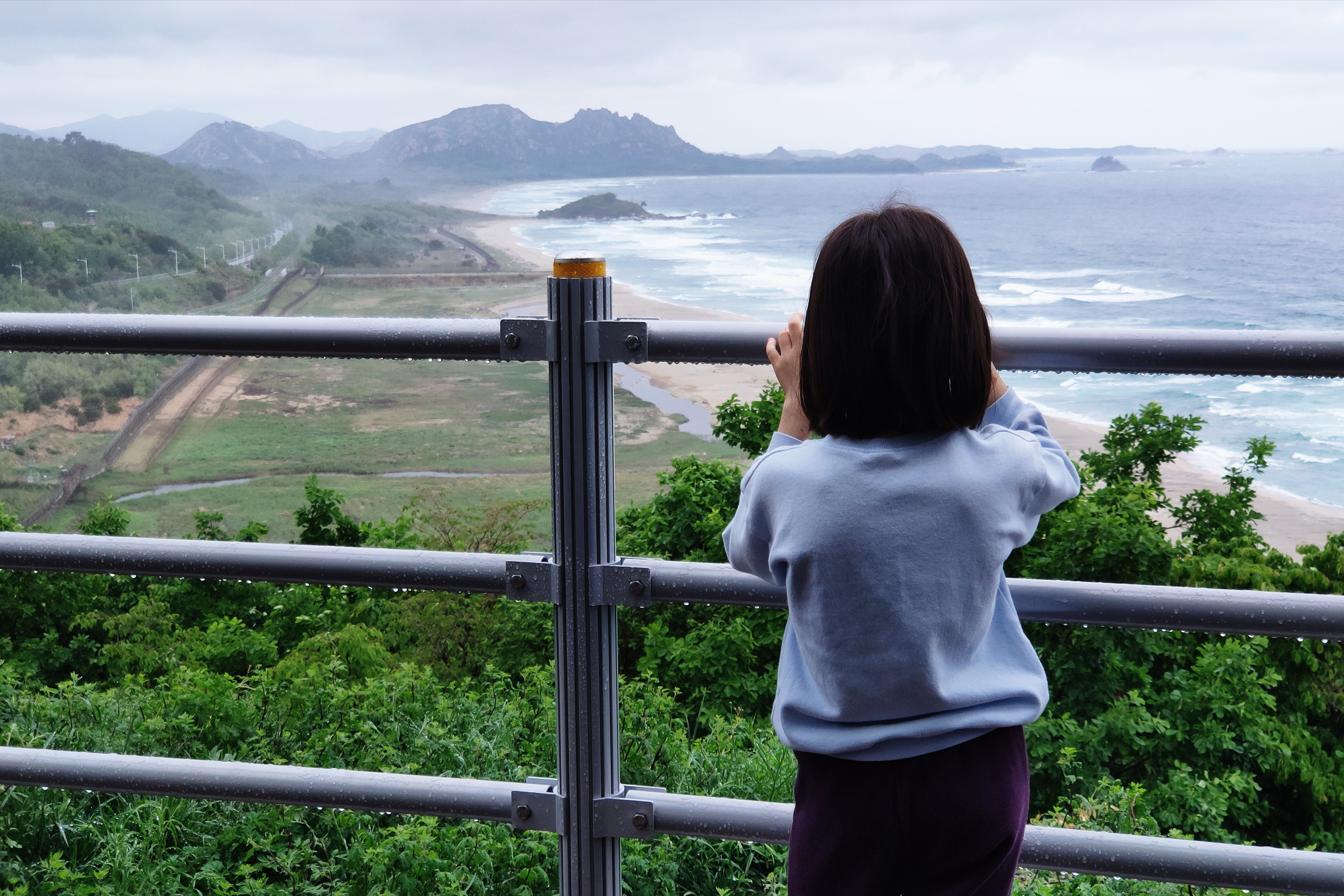
South Korean child watching North Korea's skyline from the Goseon Unification Observatory Tower

While the area was part of North Korea from 1945 to 1953, the building is now the closest most South Koreans can get to North Korea. There are binoculars installed on the viewing deck, and inside the observatory is a large map labelled with mountain names and the locations of military installations. Kiosks here sell liquor, cash, postage stamps and other souvenirs from North Korea. On a clear day, you can get a good view of Kumgang-san, about 20 km to the west. Despite the solemnity of the place, the parking lot is cluttered with souvenir shops and restaurants. On the other side of the lot is the Korean War Exhibition Hall.

==== Others ====
Gangwon Province has many tourist attractions, as well as natural monuments, including Namiseom, Tong-il Observatory (similar the Dora Observatory), Soyang Dam and Jeongdongjin. A memorial centre of the novelist Lee Hyo-seok is in Pyeongchang County. Along the coast of the Sea of Japan, many seaside resorts are located, including Gyongpo Seaside Resort.

The only domestic casino in Gangwon is Kangwon Land, located in Jeongseon County.

The province also houses the largest ski resort in South Korea, Yongpyong Resort.

== Transportation ==
=== Railway ===
Gangwon Province's railways were originally built to transport mining resources to harbours.

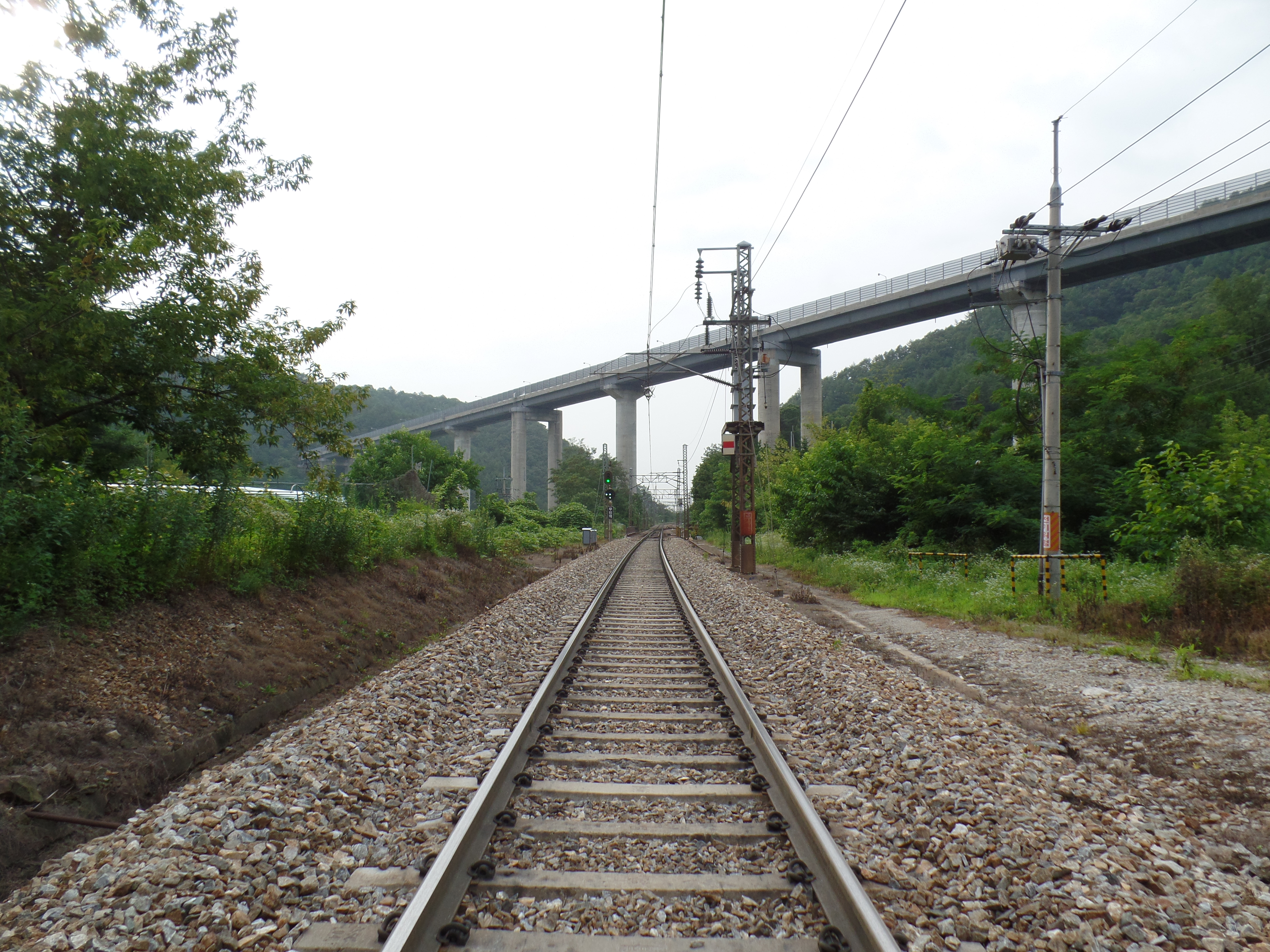
Jungang Line Northern Direction with Jungang Expressway Wonju Bridge

In Gangwon-Province, some main lines are operated. Jungang Line is connected to the Seoul Metropolitan Subway System, the Yeongdong Line and the Taebaek Line are derived from the Jungang Line, and the Gyeonggang Line was constructed, but currently it is not perfectly connected to the Seoul Metropolitan Subway System. KTX trains launched from Seoul to Gangneung on 22 December 2017 via the Gyeonggang Line, but they still run a part of the Jungang Line. In 2016, a plan was passed to extend the KTX line from Gangneung to Sokcho.

The Gyeongwon Line and the North Dong-hae Line are blocked by the Military Demarcation Line.

=== Air ===
Gangwon Province has several military airbases, while civil passengers can use only two airports, Wonju Airport and Yangyang International Airport. Wonju Airport is shared with the Republic of Korea Air Force, like Daegu International Airport and Gimhae International Airport.

Currently Wonju and Yangyang Airport are now operated as domestic airports.

=== Road ===
Gangwon Province's road length totals to 9,800 km (6,100 mi), and 75.1% is paved. Some historical and traditional ridges have survived, like Daegwallyeong. It has many routes, like Route 7, which is included in AH6.

It also has Controlled-access highways. Yeongdong Expressway is the first express way in the region, and Gwangju–Wonju Expressway, Jungang Expressway, Donghae Expressway, Seoul–Yangyang Expressway were built, afterwards. Seoul–Yangyang Expressway has the longest road tunnel in South Korea.

=== Buses ===
Like the railways, Gangwon Province is connected by intercity bus networks in South Korea. All cities and counties have intercity terminals, which connect other cities or counties in the region or connect outer cities, districts, and Incheon International Airport.

=== Sea ===
Gangwon Province has many harbours. Some harbours are fishing ports, but other harbours are used for special purposes. For example, Mukpo Harbour functions as an exporting hub for cement & coal from the Taebaek Mountains. Sokcho Harbour functions as a fishing port, a passenger harbour and as an exporting hub for iron ore. Also recently, Korea Gas Corporation built the LNG Platform Center at Hosan Harbour.

Gangwon province also has ferry lines. Sokcho Harbour has a pier for cruise ships, but until 2018, no cruise route existed.

- Domestic Ferries
  - Gangneung Harbor, Mukpo Harbor – Ulleungdo
- International Ferries
  - Donghae Harbor – Vladivostok, Sakaiminato, Tottori

== Sports ==
=== Sport teams ===
==== Soccer ====
Gangwon FC bases itself in the region, owned by Gangwon Province. Jin-seon Kim, the Governor of Gangwon Province announced it on April 28, 2008 and was established on December 18, 2008.

==== Ice Hockey ====
High1 is Kangwon Land's ice hockey team, established in September 2009. South Korea has only 3 professional ice hockey clubs, including High1.

The Daeyung Killer Whales was established in 2016, originally based in the region.

==== Basketball ====
Wonju DB Promy is a professional basketball team, based in Wonju, Gangwon Province. It was established is 1996. It donated coal in collaboration with a local government-owned company, Korea Coal Corporation.

==== List of Gangwon Province sport clubs ====
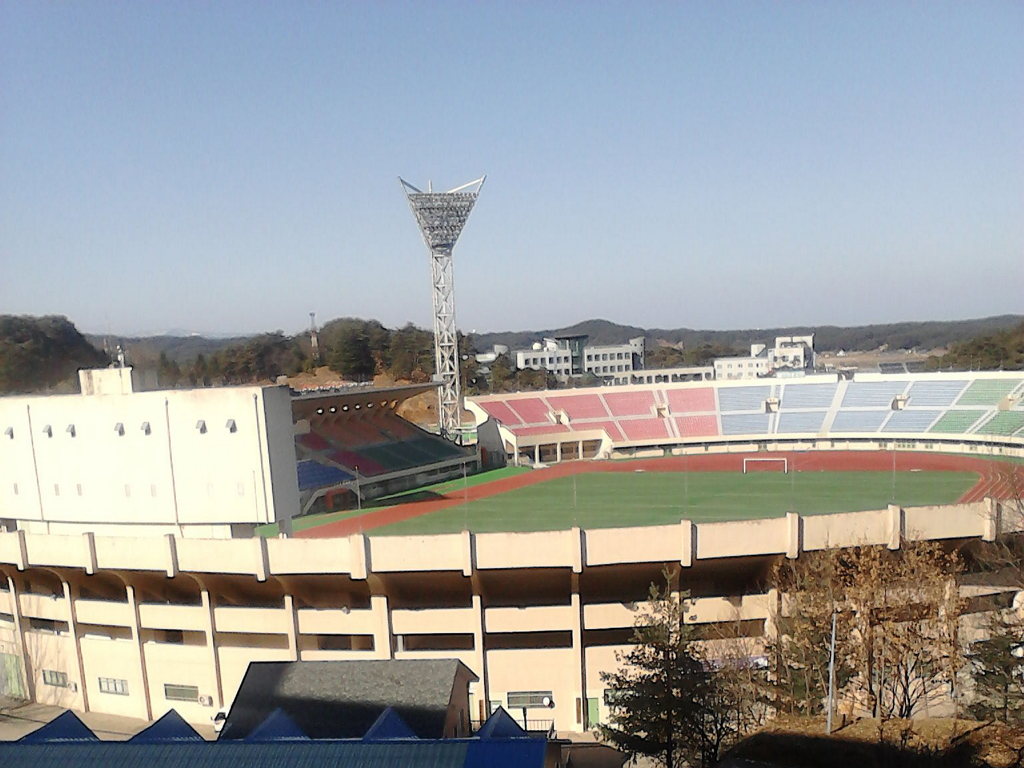
Gangneung Stadium, the home ground of Gangwon FC

Leagues	Team Name	Est.
K League 1	Gangwon FC	2008
K3 League	Gangneung Citizen FC	1999
K3 League	Chuncheon Citizen FC	2010
K4 League	Pyeongchang United FC	2008
WK League	Hwacheon KSPO WFC	2011
KBL	Wonju DB Promy	1996
Asia League Ice Hockey	High1	2004
Asia League Ice Hockey	Daemyung Killer Whales	2016

=== Sport Events ===
The 1999 Asian Winter Games were held in Gangwon Province between January 30 and February 6. South Korea, the host nation ranked 2nd in these games.

The 2018 Winter Olympics was held from February 9–25, 2018, and the 2018 Winter Paralympics was held from March 9–18, 2018. Almost all of the events were held in Pyeongchang County. Alpine skiing events were held in Jeongseon County, while some indoor events were held in Gangneung.

The 2024 Winter Youth Olympics was also held in Gangwon Province.

== Municipalities ==
The main cities of the province are Chuncheon (the provincial capital), Gangneung, Sokcho, Wonju, and Donghae. Currently Gangwon Province has 7 cities and 11 counties.

Map	#	Name	Hangul	Hanja	Population (2016)	Subdivisions
— City —
	1	Wonju	원주시	原州市	341,130	1 eup, 8 myeon, 16 haengjeong-dong
	2	Chuncheon (Capital city)	춘천시	春川市	283,951	1 eup, 9 myeon, 15 haengjeong-dong
	3	Gangneung	강릉시	江陵市	215,721	1 eup, 7 myeon, 13 haengjeong-dong
	4	Donghae	동해시	東海市	93,958	10 haengjeong-dong
	5	Sokcho	속초시	束草市	82,670	8 haengjeong-dong
	6	Samcheok	삼척시	三陟市	70,371	2 eup, 6 myeon, 4 haengjeong-dong
	7	Taebaek	태백시	太白市	47,333	8 haengjeong-dong
— County —
	8	Hongcheon County	홍천군	洪川郡	70,961	1 eup, 9 myeon
	9	Cheorwon County	철원군	鐵原郡	48,699	4 eup, 7 myeon
	10	Hoengseong County	횡성군	橫城郡	46,662	1 eup, 8 myeon
	11	Pyeongchang County	평창군	平昌郡	43,782	1 eup, 7 myeon
	12	Jeongseon County	정선군	旌善郡	38,993	4 eup, 5 myeon
	13	Yeongwol County	영월군	寧越郡	40,330	2 eup, 7 myeon
	14	Inje County	인제군	麟蹄郡	33,061	1 eup, 5 myeon
	15	Goseong County	고성군	高城郡	30,749	2 eup, 4 myeon
	16	Yangyang County	양양군	襄陽郡	27,515	1 eup, 5 myeon
	17	Hwacheon County	화천군	華川郡	26,489	1 eup, 4 myeon
	18	Yanggu County	양구군	楊口郡	24,264	1 eup, 4 myeon

=== Claimed ===
- Gimhwa County, Icheon County, Tongcheon County, Pyeonggang County and Hoeyang County

== Friendship partners ==
- Alberta, Canada
- Colorado, United States
- Jilin, China
- Tottori Prefecture, Japan
- Kedah, Malaysia
- Primorsky Krai, Russia
- Cebu, Philippines
- Special Region of Yogyakarta, Indonesia
- Tuv province, Mongolia

== See also ==
- Gangwon Province (historical)
