= Regions of Korea =

Traditional administrative divisions of the Korean Peninsula

Korea has traditionally been divided into a number of unofficial regions that reflect historical, geographical, and dialect boundaries within the peninsula. Many of the names in the list below overlap or are obsolete today, with Honam, Yeongdong, Yeongnam, and the modern term Sudogwon being the only ones in wide use.

The names of Korea's traditional Eight Provinces are often also used as regional monikers.

== List of eight regions (~1896) ==
Name	RR	MC	Hangul	Hanja	Cities and provinces	Divisions today
Haeso	Haeseo	Haesŏ	해서	海西	N. Hwanghae and S. Hwanghae	North
Kwanso	Gwanseo	Kwansŏ	관서	關西	Pyongyang, Nampo, N. Pyongan, S. Pyongan, and Chagang	North
Kwanbuk	Gwanbuk	Kwanbuk	관북	關北	Rason, N. Hamgyong, S. Hamgyong, and Ryanggang	North
Gwandong	Gwandong	Kwandong	관동	關東	Gangwon (South), and Kangwon (North)	Both
Gyeonggi	Gyeonggi	Kyŏnggi	경기	京畿	Seoul, Incheon, Gyeonggi, and Kaesong	Both
Hoseo	Hoseo	Hosŏ	호서	湖西	Daejeon, Sejong, N. Chungcheong, and S. Chungcheong	South
Honam	Honam	Honam	호남	湖南	Gwangju, N. Jeolla, S. Jeolla, and Jeju	South
Yeongnam	Yeongnam	Ryŏngnam	영남(령남)	嶺南	Busan, Daegu, Ulsan, N. Gyeongsang, and S. Gyeongsang	South

=== Extra regions ===
Name	RR	MC	Hangul	Hanja	Description
Kwannam	Gwannam	Kwannam	관남	關南	Southern part of Kwanbuk
Kwanbuk	Gwanbuk	Kwanbuk	관북	關北	Northern part of Kwanbuk
Yeongseo	Yeongseo	Ryŏngsŏ	영서(령서)	嶺西	Western part of Gwandong
Yeongdong	Yeongdong	Ryŏngdong	영동(령동)	嶺東	Eastern part of Gwandong
Giho	Giho	Kiho	기호	畿湖	Gyeonggi and Hoseo
Jeju	Jeju	Cheju	제주	濟州	Jeju Island

== See also ==
- Eight Provinces of Korea
- Korean dialects
- Provinces of Korea
- Yanbian Korean Autonomous Prefecture in Jilin, Northeast China
