= Yeongnam =

Historical region in Korea

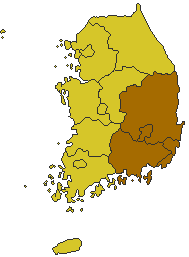
- Map of Yeongnam in South Korea

Korean name
- Hangul: 영남
- Hanja: 嶺南
- RR: Yeongnam
- MR: Yŏngnam

Yeongnam (Korean: 영남, Korean pronunciation: [jʌŋ.nam]; literally "south of the ridge") is a region that coincides with the former Gyeongsang Province, one of the ancient Eight Provinces, in what is now South Korea.

The region includes the modern-day provinces of North and South Gyeongsang and the autonomous Metropolitan cities of Busan, Daegu, and Ulsan. The regional name is used (with a slightly different spelling) as the name of Yeungnam University.

== See also ==
- Regions of Korea
- Yeongdong
- Honam
- Geography of South Korea
