= Yeongdong (region) =

Region of eastern Gangwon, South Korea

- South Korean name
- Hangul: 영동
- Hanja: 嶺東
- RR: Yeongdong
- MR: Yŏngdong

North Korean name
- Hangul: 령동
- Hanja: 嶺東
- RR: Ryeongdong
- MR: Ryŏngdong

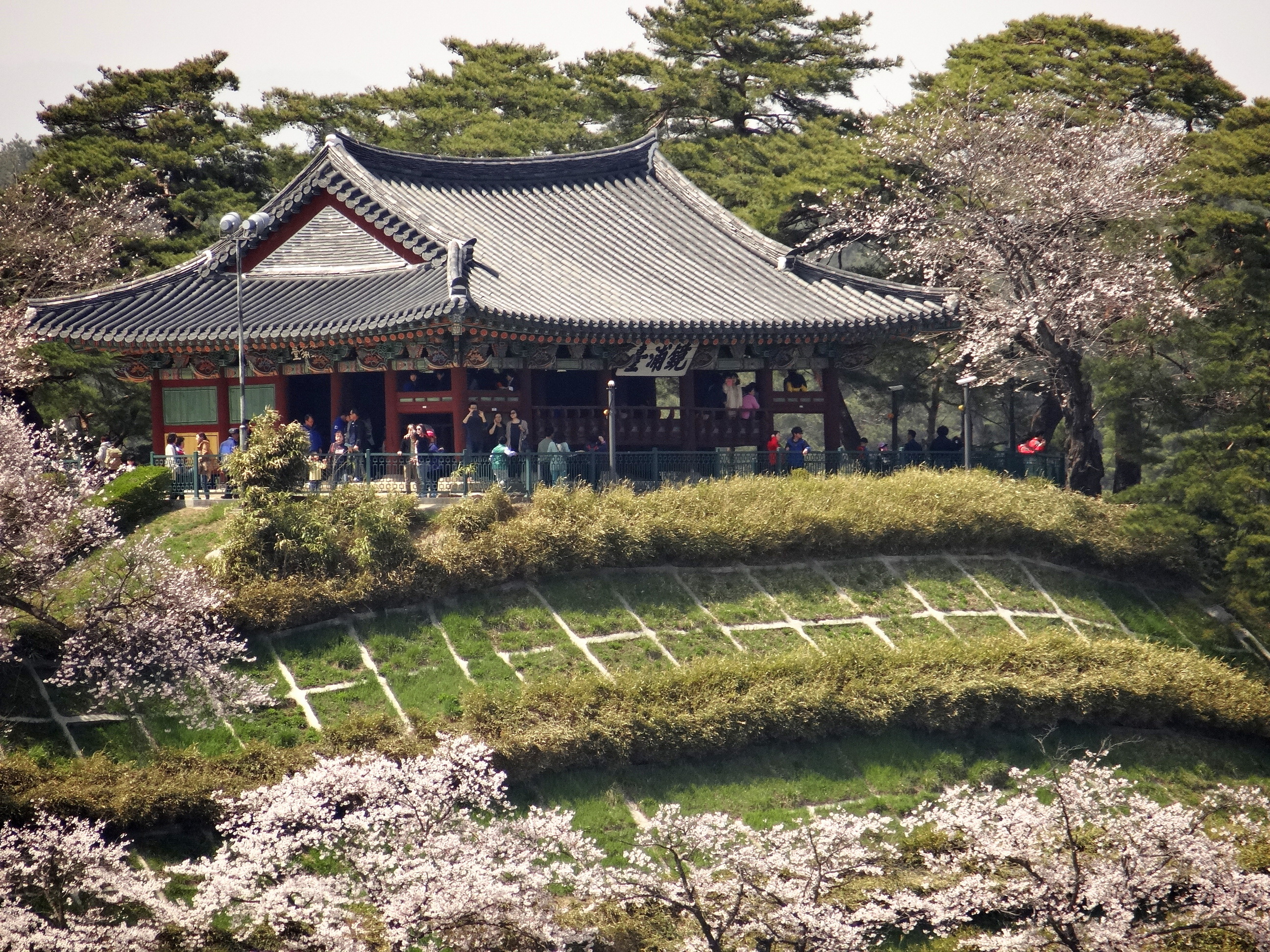
Gyeongpodae in Gangneung city, which is the biggest city in Yeongdong region

Yeongdong (Korean pronunciation: [jʌŋ.doŋ], Korean pronunciation: [ɾjɔŋ.dɤŋ], literally 'east of the passes') is the eastern, coastal region of Gangwon Province, South Korea and Kangwŏn Province, North Korea. It is divided from the inland Yeongseo region by the Taebaek Mountains.

Although Yeongseo describes the western half of the two provinces and Gwandong describes both halves together, "Yeongdong" is used much more frequently in South Korea than either of the other two names, and may be taken loosely to refer to the entire region.

The region's name lends itself to the Yeongdong Railway Line and Yeongdong Expressway, which are major transportation corridors connecting Seoul to Gangwon.

== See also ==
- Regions of Korea
- Yeongnam
