= Kangwon Province (pre-1910) =

Historical province of Korea

Kangwon Province 江原道
- Province of Joseon
- 1395–1895
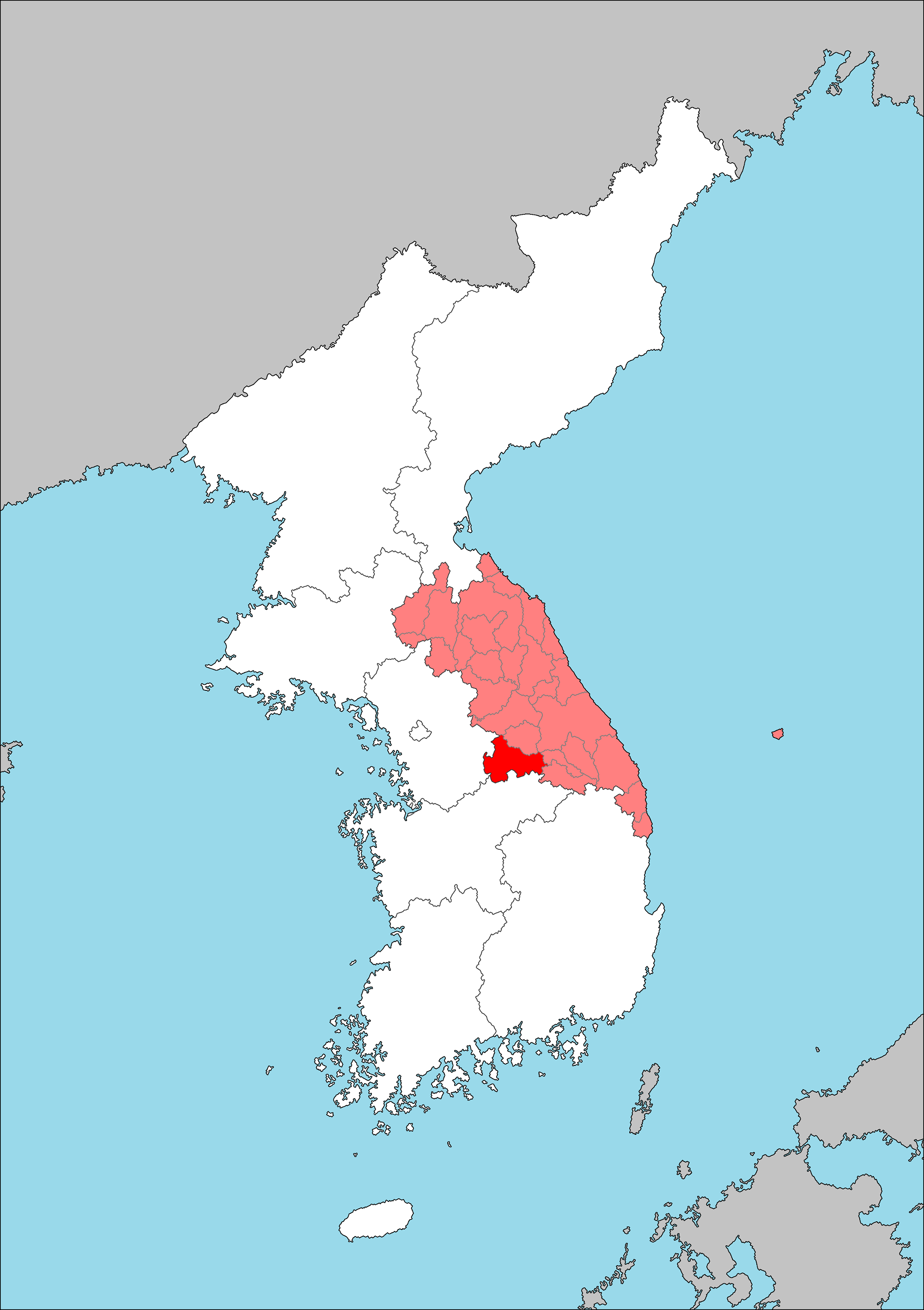
- Kangwon Province in the late Joseon period.
- Capital: Wonjumok
- Historical era: early modern
  - installation: 1395
  - disband: 1895
- Today part of: Kangwon Province, Democratic People's Republic of Korea; Gangwon Province, Gyeongsangbuk-do Uljin-gun, Gyeongsangbuk-do Ulleung-gun, Republic of Korea

- Kangwon Province
- Hangul: 강원도
- Hanja: 江原道
- RR: Gangwon-do
- MR: Kangwŏn-do

Kangwon Province or Kangwon-do (Korean: 강원도; Hanja: 江原道; Korean pronunciation: [ka̠ŋ.wʌ̹n.do̞]) was one of the Eight Provinces of Korea during the Joseon Dynasty. The province was formed in 1395, and derived its name from the names of the principal cities of Gangneung (강릉; 江陵) and the provincial capital Wonju (원주; 原州).

In 1895, Kangwon-do was replaced by the Districts of Chuncheon (Chuncheon-bu; 춘천부; 春川府) in the west and Gangneung (Gangneung-bu; 강릉부; 江陵府) in the east. (Wonju later became part of Chungju District.)

In 1896, Korea was redivided into thirteen provinces, and the two districts were merged to again form Kangwon-do Province. Although Wonju rejoined Kangwon-do province, the provincial capital was moved to Chuncheon (춘천; 春川).

With the division of Korea in 1945, the subsequent establishment of separate North and South Korean governments in 1948, and the conclusion of the Korean War in 1953, Kangwon came to be divided into separate provinces once again: Gangwon Province (South Korea) and Kangwon Province (North Korea).

== See also ==
- History of Korea
