= Yeongseo =

Region of Gangwon Province, North Korea

- South Korean name
- Hangul: 영서
- Hanja: 嶺西
- RR: Yeongseo
- MR: Yŏngsŏ

North Korean name
- Hangul: 령서
- Hanja: 嶺西
- RR: Ryeongseo
- MR: Ryŏngsŏ

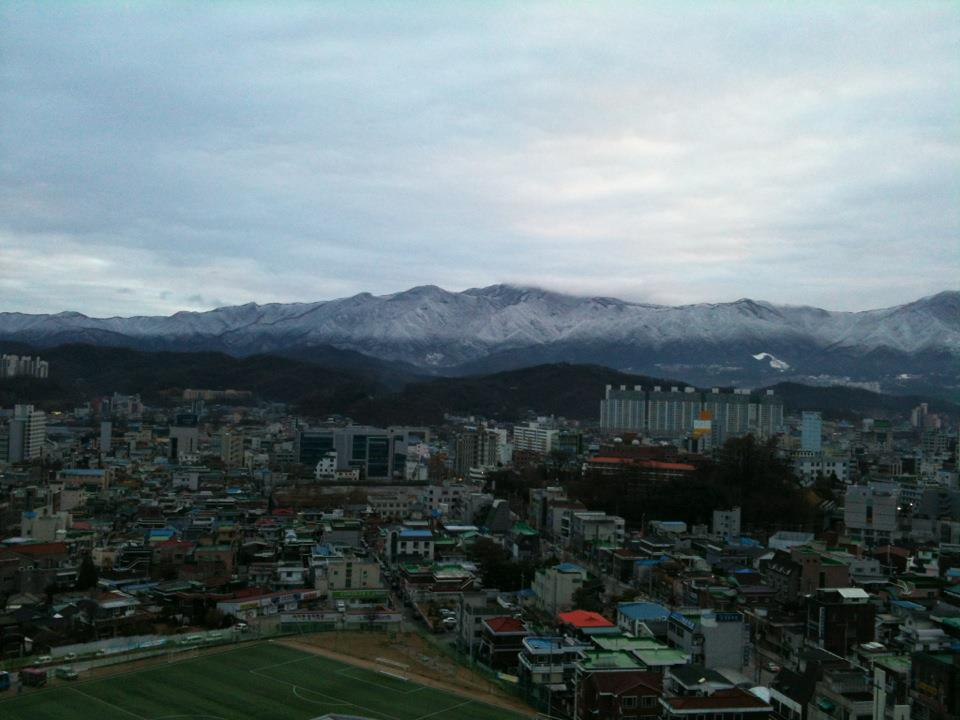
Skyline of Wonju, which is the biggest city in Yeongseo region

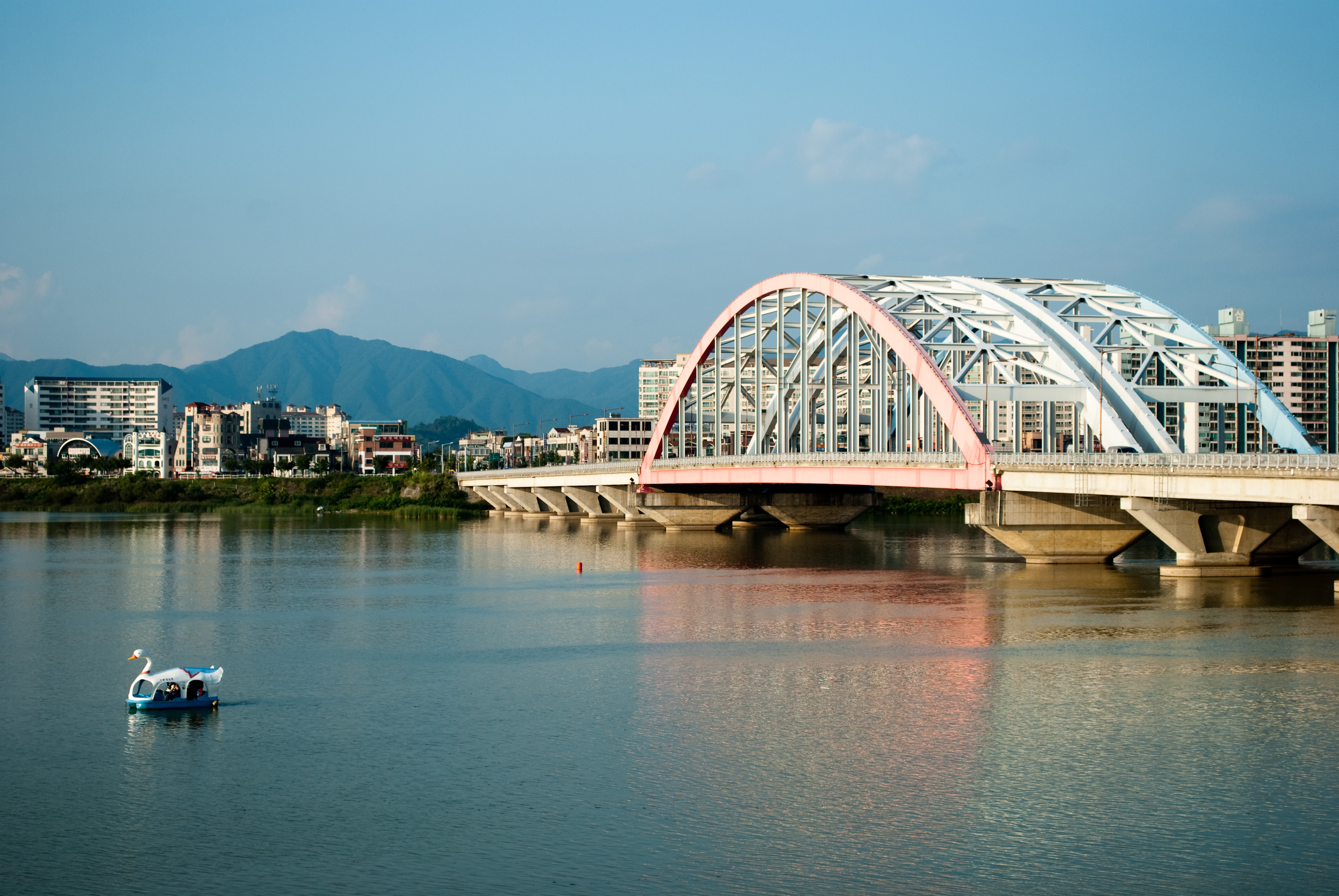
Soyang River and Soyang 2 Bridge in the city of Chuncheon, which has provincial office of Gangwon province.

Yeongseo (Korean pronunciation: [jʌŋ.sʌ], Korean pronunciation: [ɾjɔŋ.sɔ]) is the western, inland region of Gangwon Province, South Korea and Kangwon Province, North Korea. It is divided from the coastal Yeongdong region by the Taebaek Mountains. The name yeongseo reflects this distinction; it literally means “west of the passes”. The region is marked by high plateaus and mountains, with deep valleys. The Han and Nakdong Rivers both have their headwaters in this region. Agriculture in Yeongseo was traditionally carried out by slash-and-burn methods, but in modern times this has largely been replaced by other techniques, including high-altitude shiitake farming.

== See also ==
- Geography of South Korea
- Geography of North Korea
- Korean Peninsula
