= Nam-myeon, Jeongseon County =

Coordinates: 37°22′45″N 128°39′53″E

Nam-myeon
- Township
- Interactive map of Nam-myeon
- Country: South Korea
- Region: Gwandong
- Administrative divisions: 5 ri

Population
  - Dialect: Gangwon

Korean name
- Hangul: 남면
- Hanja: 南面
- RR: Nam-myeon
- MR: Nam-myŏn

Nam-myeon (Korean: 남면; lit. 'South Township') is a rural city in Jeongseon County, Gangwon-do located between Gohan-eup and Jeongseon-eup.

== Education ==
There are 2 small schools in Nam-myeon.

- Namseon Elementary School (남선초등학교)
- Moongok Middle School (문곡중학교)

== Attractions ==
High Resort 1, a ski resort, is located nearby in Gohan-eup, Gangwonland.

== See also ==
- Geography of South Korea
