= Jungwangsan =

Mountain in South Korea

Highest point
- Elevation: 1,376.1 m (4,515 ft)

Geography
- Location: South Korea

Korean name
- Hangul: 중왕산
- Hanja: 中旺山
- RR: Jungwangsan
- MR: Chungwangsan

Jungwangsan (Korean: 중왕산) is a mountain between the counties of Jeongseon and Pyeongchang, Gangwon Province, South Korea. It has an elevation of 1,376.1 m (4,515 ft).

== See also ==
- List of mountains in Korea
