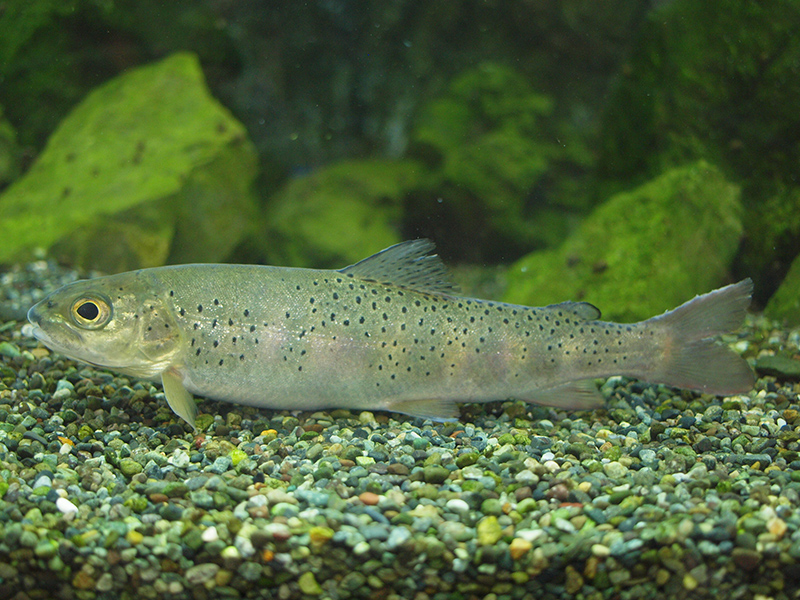
- Individual of the South Korean population (see text regarding its taxonomic position)

Scientific classification
- Domain: Eukaryota
- Kingdom: Animalia
- Phylum: Chordata
- Class: Actinopterygii
- Order: Salmoniformes
- Family: Salmonidae
- Genus: Brachymystax
- Species: B. tumensis

Binomial name
- Brachymystax tumensis Mori, 1930

= Brachymystax tumensis =

Species of fish

Brachymystax tumensis, commonly known as the blunt-snouted lenok or Tumen lenok, is a salmonid fish distributed in rivers and lakes in Eastern Asia. It was formerly included in the more widespread species Brachymystax lenok (now known as the sharp-snouted lenok), but more recent research based on differences in morphology and genetics have justified a distinction of the two species.

Brachymystax tumensis is found widely in southeastern Russia and more locally in northeastern and central parts of the country (including Sakhalin), as well as northeastern Mongolia (Amur Basin), northern China and Korea (e.g. Tumen River). In some regions, such as the Amur Basin, the range may overlap with that of B. lenok. Earlier authorities have included the South Korean population in B. tsinlingensis instead of B. tumensis and this appears to be supported by mtDNA (although its exact taxonomic position remains to be determined).
