= Hedinichthys =

Scientific classification
- Kingdom: Animalia
- Phylum: Chordata
- Class: Actinopterygii
- Order: Cypriniformes
- Family: Nemacheilidae
- Genus: Hedinichthys; Rendahl (de), 1933

Type species
- Nemacheilus yarkandensis Day, 1877

Synonyms
- Minihedinichthys Prokofiev, 2017

Genus of fishes

Hedinichthys is a genus of the stone loaches endemic to China. It has been regarded as a subgenus of Triplophysa.

== Species ==
There are currently three recognized species in this genus:

- Hedinichthys grummorum Prokofiev, 2010
- Hedinichthys macropterus (Herzenstein, 1888)
- Hedinichthys minuta (S.-C. Li, 1966)
- Hedinichthys yarkandensis (F. Day, 1877) (Kashgarian loach)
