= Mindungsan =

Mindungsan may refer to:

- Mindungsan (Gangwon), a mountain in the county of Jeongseon, Gangwon-do, South Korea
- Mindungsan (Gyeonggi), a mountain near Pocheon in the county of Gapyeong, Gyeonggi-do, South Korea
