= T. minuta =

T. minuta may refer to:

- Tagetes minuta, the Mexican marigold, mint marigold, wild marigold or stinking Roger, a tall upright plant species native to the southern half of South America
- Triplophysa minuta, a ray-finned fish species

== See also ==
- Minuta
