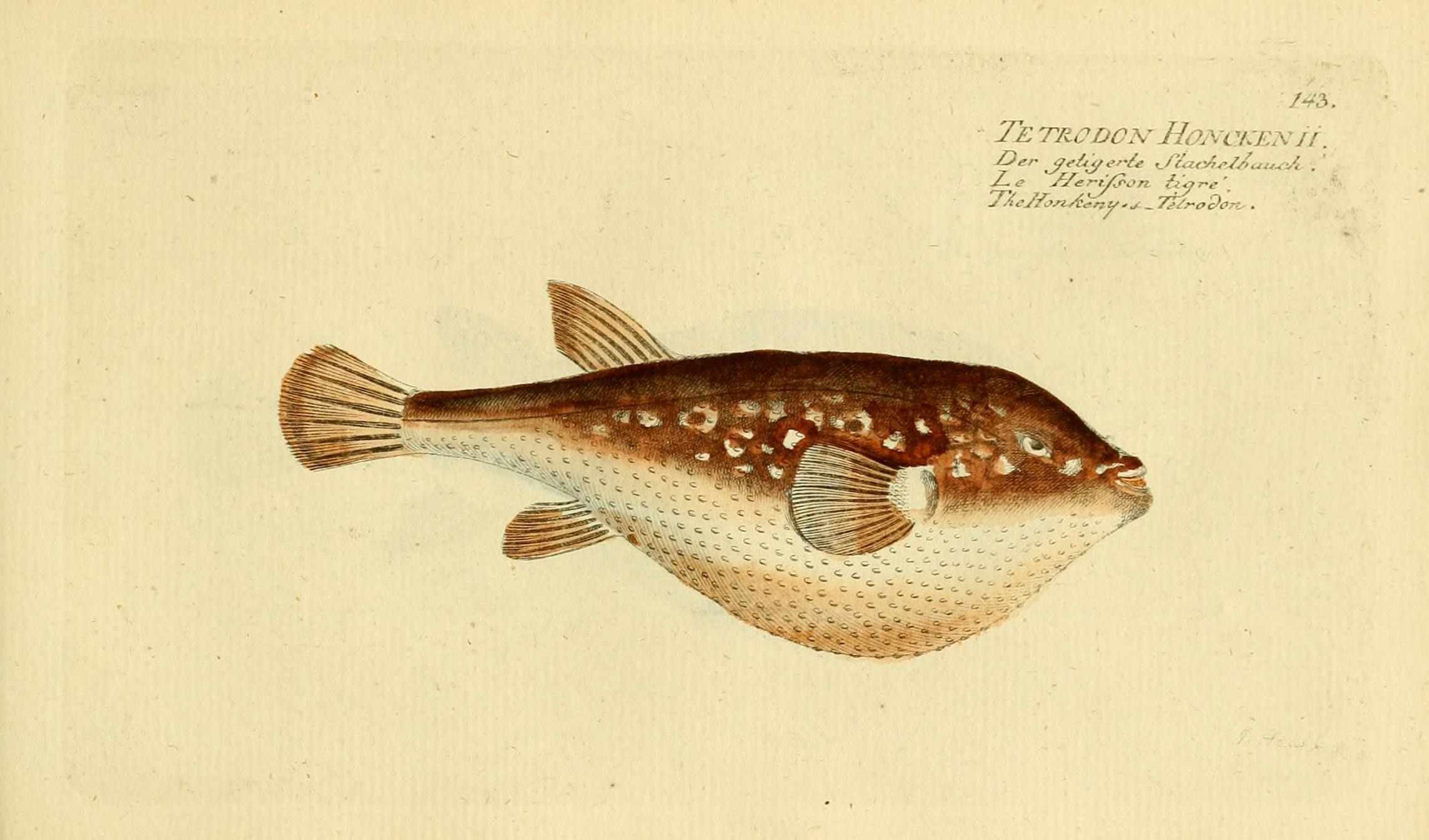
- Amblyrhynchotes honckenii

Scientific classification
- Domain: Eukaryota
- Kingdom: Animalia
- Phylum: Chordata
- Class: Actinopterygii
- Order: Tetraodontiformes
- Family: Tetraodontidae
- Subfamily: Tetraodontinae
- Genus: Amblyrhynchotes; Troschel, 1856

Species
- See text

= Amblyrhynchotes =

Genus of pufferfishes

Amblyrhynchotes is a genus of pufferfishes native to the Indian and Pacific Oceans.

== Species ==
There are at least two recognized species in this genus:

- Amblyrhynchotes honckenii (Bloch, 1785) (evileye blaasop)
- Amblyrhynchotes rufopunctatus S. C. Li, 1962
