= Daraksan =

Mountain in Jeongseon, South Korea

Highest point
- Elevation: 1,018 m (3,340 ft)

Geography
- Location: South Korea

Korean name
- Hangul: 다락산
- Hanja: 多樂山
- RR: Daraksan
- MR: Taraksan

Daraksan (Korean: 다락산) is a mountain in Jeongseon County, Gangwon Province, South Korea. It has an elevation of 1,018 m (3,340 ft).

== See also ==
- List of mountains in Korea
