= Jeongseon Alpine Centre =

Skiing area in South Korea

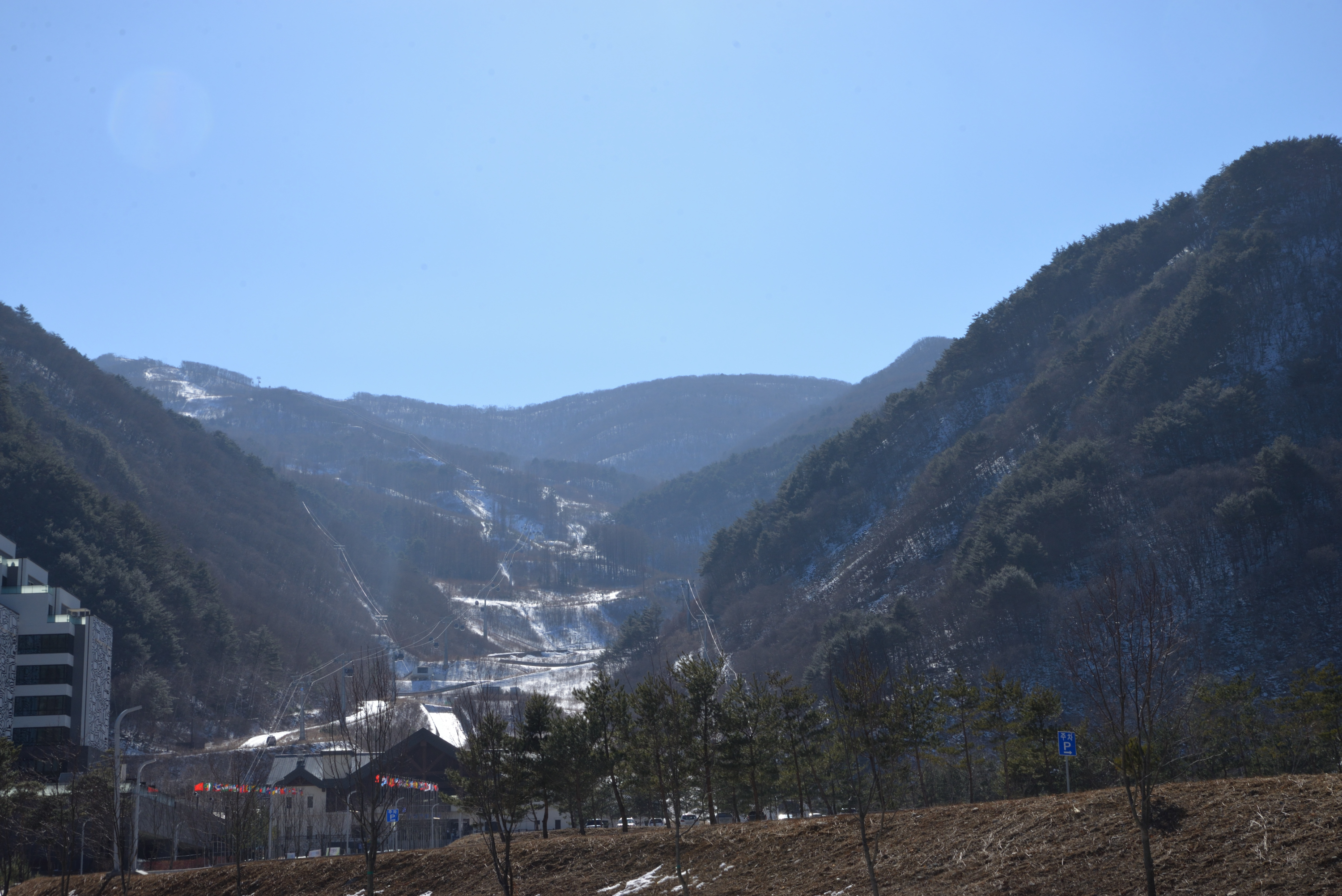

- Location in South Korea
- Location: Gariwangsan (mountain), Bukpyeong-myeon, Jeongseon, Gangwon Province, South Korea
- Coordinates: 37.474°N 128.610°E
- Vertical: 825 m (2,707 ft)
- Top elevation: 1,370 m (4,495 ft)
- Base elevation: 545 m (1,788 ft)
- Longest run: Men's downhill 2.85 km (1.77 mi)
- Snowmaking: yes

Jeongseon Alpine Centre (Korean: 정선 알파인 경기장) was an alpine skiing area in South Korea. It was located on the slopes of the mountain of Gariwangsan, in Bukpyeong-myeon in the county of Jeongseon.

== Overview ==
Jeongseon was a venue for the Pyeongchang Winter Olympics, hosting the alpine speed events of Downhill, Super-G, and Combined. It accommodated 6,000 spectators. The technical events of slalom and giant slalom were scheduled for Yongpyong Resort in the county of Pyeongchang.

The capacity of the venue was 6,500 (3,600 Seats / 2,900 Standing).

The men's downhill started at an elevation of 1,370 m (4,495 ft), with a course length of 2.857 km (1.775 mi), to a finish area at 545 m (1,788 ft). The vertical drop of 825 m (2,707 ft) surpassed the minimum drop of 800 m (2,625 ft) required by the International Ski Federation (FIS). The women's downhill had a length of 2.388 km (1.484 mi) and a vertical drop of 748 m (2,450 ft). In the initial plan, the men's course was projected to start at another Jung-bong (peak) area, an elevation of 1,430 m (4,690 ft), but was integrated with the women's course starting at lower Ha-bong area, with some environmental criticism and protests.

The venue Gariwang mountain is one of the most remote areas in South Korea.

The centre officially opened in 2016 on January 22, two weeks prior to its first events, men's World Cup speed events. The downhill on February 6 was won by Kjetil Jansrud of Norway with a time of 1:41.38, and the super-G the next day was won by Carlo Janka of Switzerland.

The women tested the Olympic venue in 2017 with two World Cup speed events in early March. Both races had the same podium finishers with Sofia Goggia of Italy in first, Lindsey Vonn of the United States in second, and Ilka Štuhec of Slovenia in third.

== Ecological Issues ==
Environmental groups raised concerns surrounding the deforestation from the slopes of Gariwang mountain to build the Jeongseon Alpine Centre. Officials claimed it is necessary as it is the only slope that could accommodate Olympic requirements and the forest was to be restored after the games were done. Environmental groups were skeptical as the forest includes old growth of ancient and rare species.

A nearby stream was diverted into a reservoir at the base of the ski runs. The reservoir supplied water used to create artificial snow for the ski runs.

== Post-olympics ==
Jeongseon Alpine Centre was closed and facilities were partially dismantled.

The cable cars were reopened to the public in January 2023 for a two-year run, after which time complete dismantlement of facilities and restoration of the mountain is planned.
