= Jeongseon station =

Railway station in Gangwon, South Korea

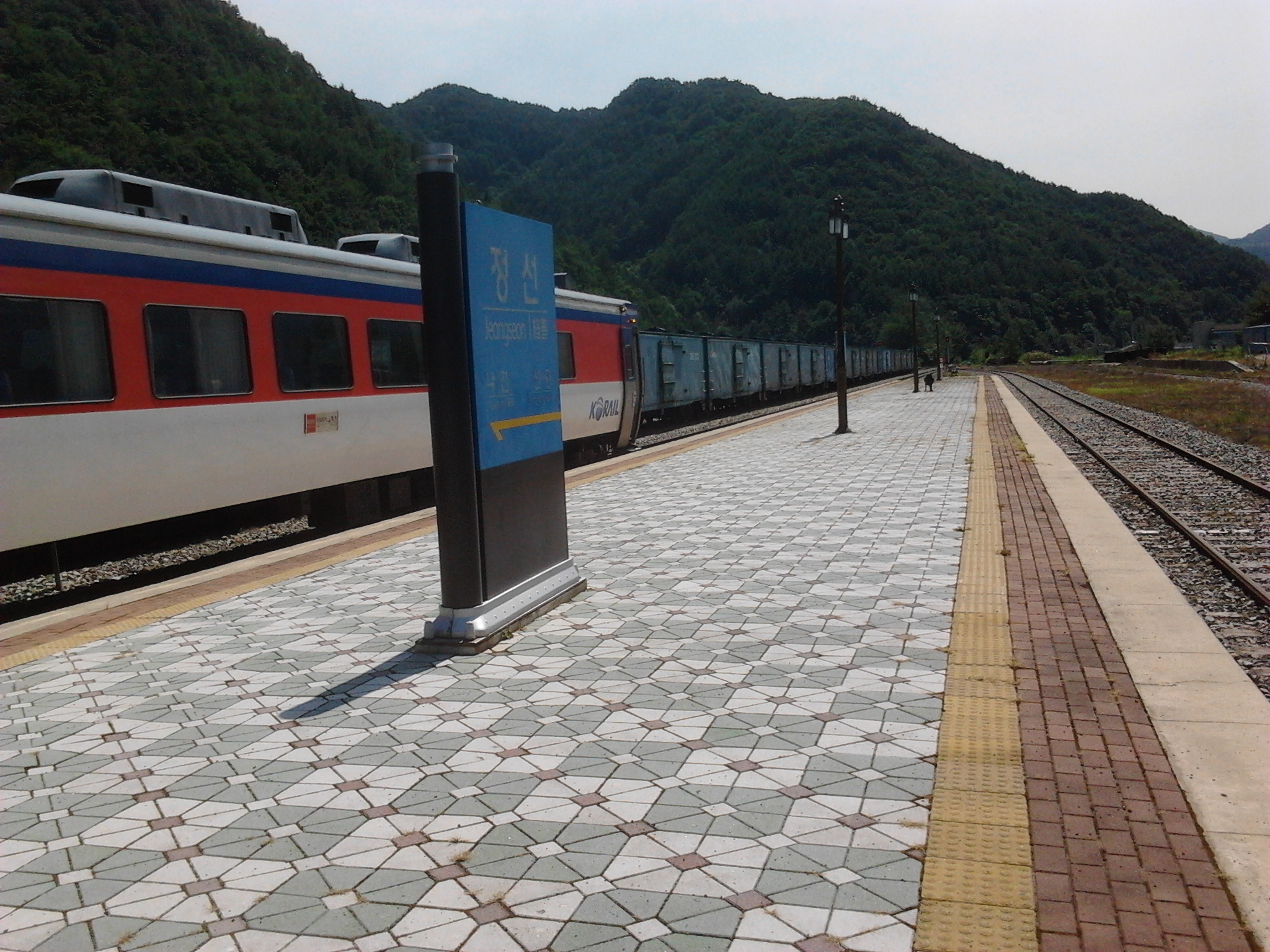

Korean name
- Hangul: 정선역
- Hanja: 旌善驛
- Revised Romanization: Jeongseonnyeok
- McCune–Reischauer: Chŏngsŏnnyŏk

General information
- Location: Aesan-ri, Jeongseon-eup, Jeongseon, Gangwon; South Korea
- Coordinates: 37°23′17″N 128°40′19″E
- Operator: Korail
- Line: Jeongseon Line

Construction
- Structure type: Aboveground

History
- Opened: January 20, 1967
Location

Jeongseon station is a railway station on the Jeongseon Line in Jeongseon, Gangwon, South Korea.
