= Brachymystax savinovi =

Conservation status
- Endangered (IUCN 3.1)

Scientific classification
- Kingdom: Animalia
- Phylum: Chordata
- Class: Actinopterygii
- Order: Salmoniformes
- Family: Salmonidae
- Genus: Brachymystax
- Species: B. savinovi

Binomial name
- Brachymystax savinovi Mitrofanov, 1959

Species of fish

Brachymystax savinovi is a salmonid fish species endemic to Markakol Lake and adjacent rivers in eastern Kazakhstan. It was formerly included in the more widespread species Brachymystax lenok (now known as the sharp-snouted lenok).
