= A-Train (Korail) =

South Korean tourist train

A-Train aka Jeongseon Arirang Train
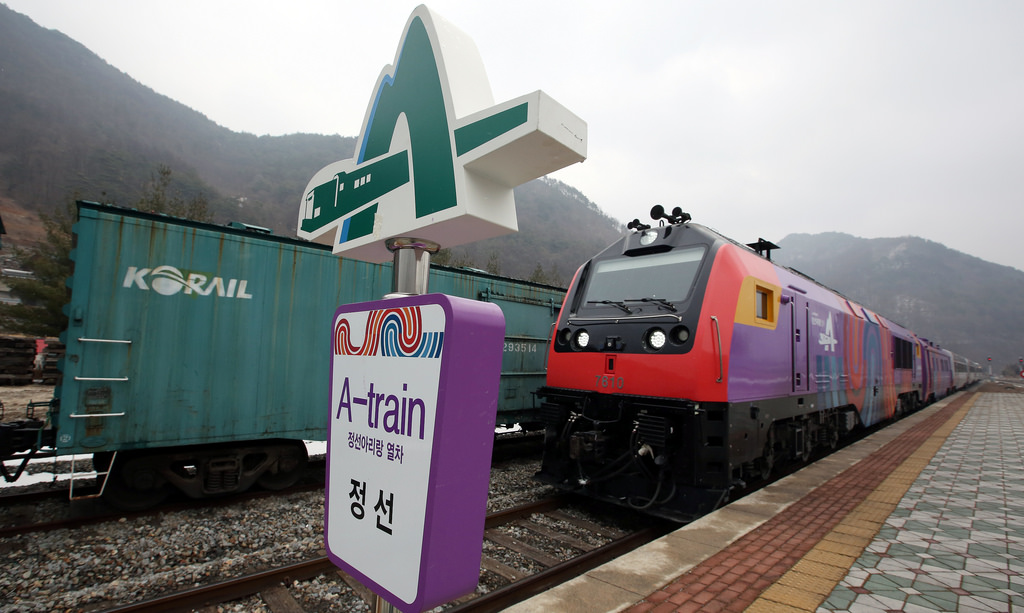

Overview
- Owner: Korail
- Termini: Cheongnyangni Station; Auraji Station

Service
- Type: Regional rail
- System: Korail
- Services: Jungang Line; Taebaek Line; Trim Line
- Operator: Korail

History
- Opened: (Prior) November 27, 2002 - December 31, 2007, Jeongseon Arirang excursion trains, (Current) January 22, 2015 - present

A-Train aka Jeongseon Arirang A-Train (Korean: 정선아리랑열차) is a South Korean tourist train operated by Korail. The train began operations in 2015 and transports tourists through Jeongseon County in central Gangwon-do.

== Overview ==
The train opened on January 22, 2015, from Cheongnyangni Station in northeastern Seoul and passes through several stations in Gangwon-do, including Mindungsan and Jeongseon, which hosts the "Jeongseon Five-day Market", and arriving at Auraji Station.

The "A" in the train's name comes from "Arirang" (a Korean folk song), and the words "amazement" and "adventure". The song has many variations, and the Jeongseon Arirang is a regional one. The song is listed as an Intangible Cultural Heritage by UNESCO and sometimes regarded as an unofficial anthem of Korea.

The train has four themed cars with large windows and glass walls; one is a sky room, one a tea room, and two of the cars are decorated in regional colors of red, yellow, blue and purple representing Jeongseon's geographical features such as the Dong River and the mountain ridges. The train's exterior includes a purple color for the pulsatilla, Jeongseon's official flower, and is decorated with curves that symbolize the Arirang melody. Activities on the train include storytelling, music, magic shows and quiz games.

The new line to Jeongseon is the first train to be named after a Korean town, and generated additional local interest due to the proximity of the scheduled 2018 Winter Olympics in Pyeongchang, a nearby town.

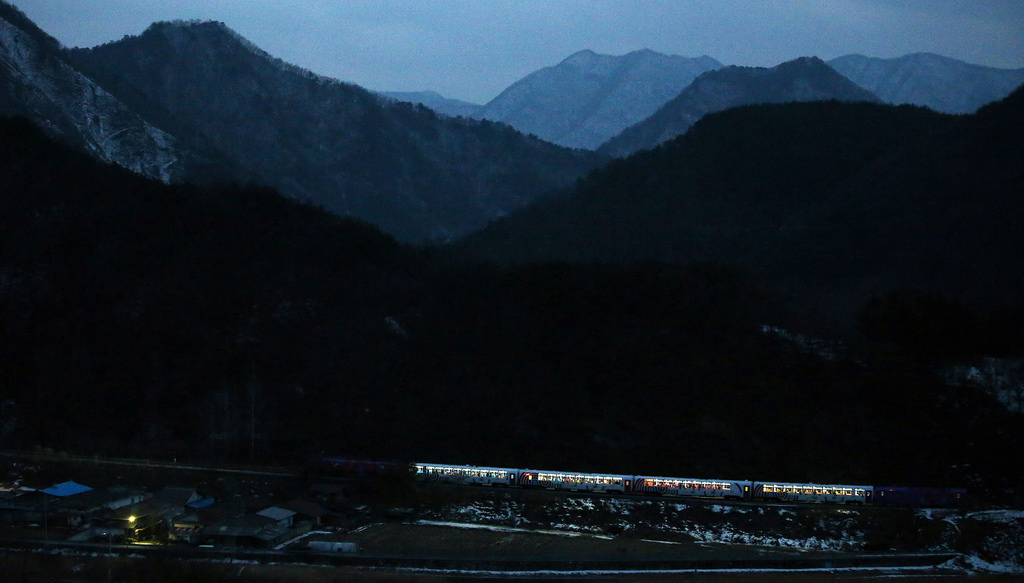
A-Train en route Jeongseon-gum, Gangwon-do.

On February 19, 2024, the track was damaged due to a rockfall between Mindungsan Mountain and Byeoleogok, and service between Mindungsan Mountain and Auraji was suspended indefinitely from the 22nd.

== Operations ==
- Started running: January 22, 2015
- Stations: Cheongnyangni station - Mindungsan station - Byeoreogok station - Sonpyong station - Jeongseon station - Najeon station - Auraji station
- Approximate travel time: 3 Hours
