= Toninia poeltiana =

Scientific classification
- Kingdom: Fungi
- Division: Ascomycota
- Class: Lecanoromycetes
- Order: Lecanorales
- Family: Ramalinaceae
- Genus: Toninia
- Species: T. poeltiana

Binomial name
- Toninia poeltiana S.Y.Kondr., Lőkös & Hur (2016)
- Holotype: Jeongseon-eup, South Korea

Species of lichen

Toninia poeltiana is a species of lichenicolous (lichen-dwelling) fungus in the family Ramalinaceae. It was described as a new species in 2016 by the lichenologists Sergey Kondratyuk, László Lőkös, and Jae-Seoun Hur. The species epithet honours the German lichenologist Josef Poelt, who had a particular interest in parasitic lichens.

== Description ==
The fungus produces minute, dark fruiting bodies (apothecia) on the surface of its host lichen. These are typically 0.15–0.4 mm across and up to about 0.1 mm thick, often perched on a tiny stalk to 0.10–0.13 mm high. Seen from above they are black to very dark brown, slightly domed from an early stage and usually without a clear outer rim; they are not dusted with a pale frosting (they are epruinose).

In vertical section, the firm outer wall (true exciple) is up to about 50 μm thick at the upper sides and about 30 μm lower down, with a dark outer layer that turns violet in the N test and a greyer, colourless inner portion; the base is thin (to roughly 15 μm) and colourless. The spore-bearing layer (hymenium) is 40–50 μm tall, topped by a 10–15 μm thick surface zone (epihymenium) that is bluish to violet-black and reacts violet with both potassium hydroxide solution (K) and the N test—features useful for separating it from similar species. The layer beneath the hymenium (subhymenium) is 40–50 μm thick and colourless. The supporting sterile threads (paraphyses) are stuck together, swell to about 4 μm at the tips and have slightly darker surroundings near their ends. Asci produce eight colourless ascospores that have 1–3 cross-walls; the spores measure 13–21 × 2.5–4 μm and remain hyaline. Asexual fruiting bodies (pycnidia) were not observed in the type material.

== Habitat and distribution ==
Toninia poeltiana lives on other lichens rather than on bare rock or bark. It grows on the thallus of Verrucaria fuscella, mainly along the edges of the host's small polygonal patches (areoles) and occasionally on their upper surfaces. The species appears to coexist without obvious damage to the host. As of its original publication, it was only known to occur at the type locality on calcareous rock in Jeongseon-eup, Republic of Korea, where it was recorded growing alongside a Collema lichen.
