= Dalgibong =

Mountain in Jeongseon, South Korea

Highest point
- Elevation: 1,028 m (3,373 ft)

Geography
- Location: South Korea

Korean name
- Hangul: 닭이봉
- Hanja: 닭이峰
- RR: Dalgibong
- MR: Talgibong

Alternate name
- Hangul: 계봉
- Hanja: 鷄峰
- RR: Gyebong
- MR: Kyebong

Dalgibong (Korean: 닭이봉) is a mountain in Jeongseon County, Gangwon Province, South Korea. It has an elevation of 1,028 m (3,373 ft).

== See also ==
- List of mountains in Korea
