= Brachymystax tsinlingensis =

Scientific classification
- Kingdom: Animalia
- Phylum: Chordata
- Class: Actinopterygii
- Order: Salmoniformes
- Family: Salmonidae
- Genus: Brachymystax
- Species: B. tsinlingensis

Binomial name
- Brachymystax tsinlingensis Li, 1966

Synonyms
- Brachymystax lenok tsinlingensis Li, 1966

Species of freshwater fish

Brachymystax tsinlingensis, also known as the Qinling lenok, is a species of salmonid.

== Taxonomy ==
Brachymystax tsinlingensis was originally described as a subspecies of B. lenok being B. l. tsinlingensis by Li Sizhong, being differentiated by lower counts of rakers etc. But with the author only referencing two specimens, it was later synonymized in 1984 with B. l. lenok. However, in 2015, a study revised the taxonomy and not only revived it but upgraded it to species status.

Brachymystax tsinlingensis has been show to yield high genetic diverstiy.

The specific name tsinlingensis is derived from its native range in the Qingling mountains.

== Description ==
Brachymystax tsinlingensis has an elongated body, a compressed caudal peduncle, blunt head, large rounded eyes, a short anterior nostril, a large gill opening, and the body being brown with a white belly with black spots dotted around. It can be distinguished with other species, with lack of spots on the operculum, 15 to 20 gill rakers, 98 to 116 lateral-line scales and 60 to 71 pyloric caeca. The eggs are measured 1 to 1.5mm in diameter.

== Habitat and ecology ==
This species lives in the cold-water rivers of Qinling mountains in China, and South Korea. It lives in mountainous rivers up to 900 to 2300m, and prefers shallow swift streams or deep pools.

Brachymystax tsinlingensis reaches sexual maturity in under 2 years. During breeding season which occurs in February and March, B.tsinlingensis spawn in shallow streams under 10 °C. When under heat stress, the species goes under apotosis and ferroptosis, which may allow it to survive. B. tsinlingensis feeds on insects including, ladybugs and gadbees, as well as small fish.

== Conservation ==
The population of Brachymystax tsinlingensis has decreased due to environmental pressures, human activities, and overfishing. In 1997 in Xushui river, there were an estimated 50,000 individuals. The species occurs in various protected areas such as some in Heihe River region. Captive breeding of this species has also proven to be successful.
