= Sindong-eup =

- Town
- Location of Sindong-eup in South Korea
- Coordinates: 37°14′47.65″N 128°39′21.39″E
- Country: South Korea
- Province: Gangwon
- County: Jeongseon
- Administrative divisions: 15 ri

Area
  - Total: 119.84 km^{2} (46.27 sq mi)

Population (2015)
  - Total: 3,810
  - Density: 31.8/km^{2} (82.3/sq mi)
- Time zone: UTC+9 (Korea Standard Time)

Korean name
- Hangul: 신동읍
- Hanja: 新東邑
- RR: Sindong-eup
- MR: Sindong-ŭp

Sindong-eup (Korean: 신동읍) is a town in Jeongseon, South Korea. The town has a surface area of 119.84 km^{2} (46.27 sq mi) and a population of 3,810.
