= Callionymus hainanensis =

Scientific classification
- Domain: Eukaryota
- Kingdom: Animalia
- Phylum: Chordata
- Class: Actinopterygii
- Order: Callionymiformes
- Family: Callionymidae
- Genus: Callionymus
- Species: C. hainanensis

Binomial name
- Callionymus hainanensis S. C. Li, 1966

Species of fish

Callionymus hainanensis, the Hainan deepwater dragonet, is a species of dragonet native to the western Pacific Ocean. This species grows to a length of 7.7 centimetres (3.0 in) SL.
