= Hedinichthys macropterus =

Scientific classification
- Kingdom: Animalia
- Phylum: Chordata
- Class: Actinopterygii
- Order: Cypriniformes
- Family: Nemacheilidae
- Genus: Hedinichthys
- Species: H. macropterus

Binomial name
- Hedinichthys macropterus (Herzenstein, 1888)

Synonyms
- Nemacheilus yarkandensis macropterus Herzenstein, 1888; Triplophysa yarkandensis macroptera (Herzenstein, 1888)

Species of fish

Hedinichthys macropterus is a species of stone loach. It is endemic to the Khesi basin in China.

== Description ==
Hedinichthys macropterus reaches a standard length of 26.5 cm (10.4 in).
