= Mindungsan (Gangwon) =

Mountain in Jeongseon, Gangwon-do, South Korea

Highest point
- Elevation: 1,118.8 m (3,671 ft)

Geography
- Location: South Korea

Korean name
- Hangul: 민둥산
- Hanja: 민둥山
- RR: Mindungsan
- MR: Mindungsan

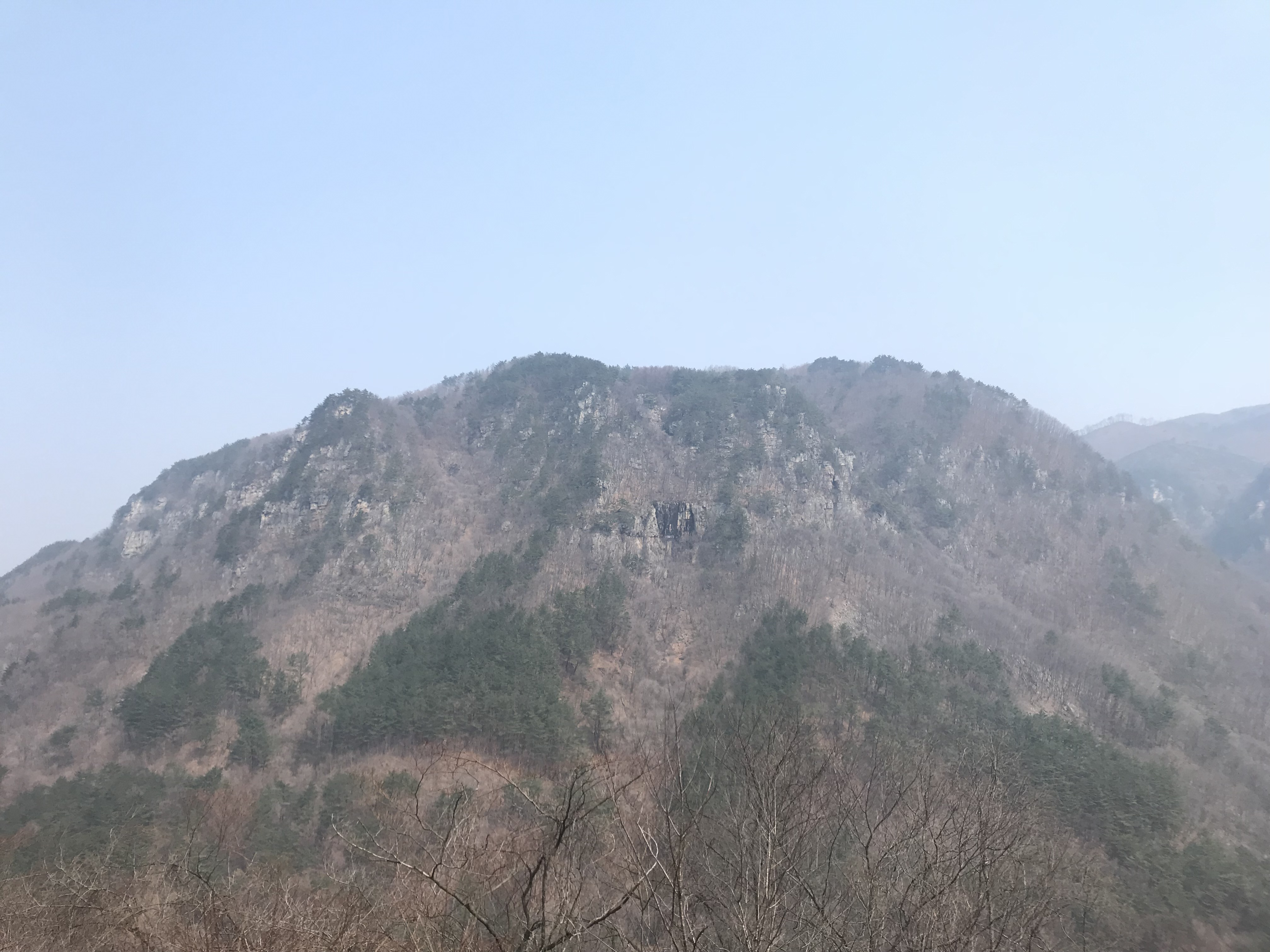
Mindungsan, a mountain in Jeongseon, Gangwon-do, South Korea

Mindungsan is a mountain in Jeongseon County, Gangwon Province, South Korea. It has an elevation of 1,118.8 m (3,671 ft).

== See also ==
- List of mountains in Korea
