= Bukpyeong-myeon, Jeongseon County =

Township in South Korea

Coordinates: 37°26′49″N 128°39′59″E

- Hangul: 북평면
- Hanja: 北坪面
- RR: Bukpyeong-myeon
- MR: Pukp'yŏng-myŏn

Bukpyeong-myeon (Korean: 북평면) is a township in South Korea, located in the county of Jeongseon. The Jeongseon Alpine Centre, which hosted alpine skiing events (Super-G and downhill) of the 2018 Winter Olympics, is located on its territory.
