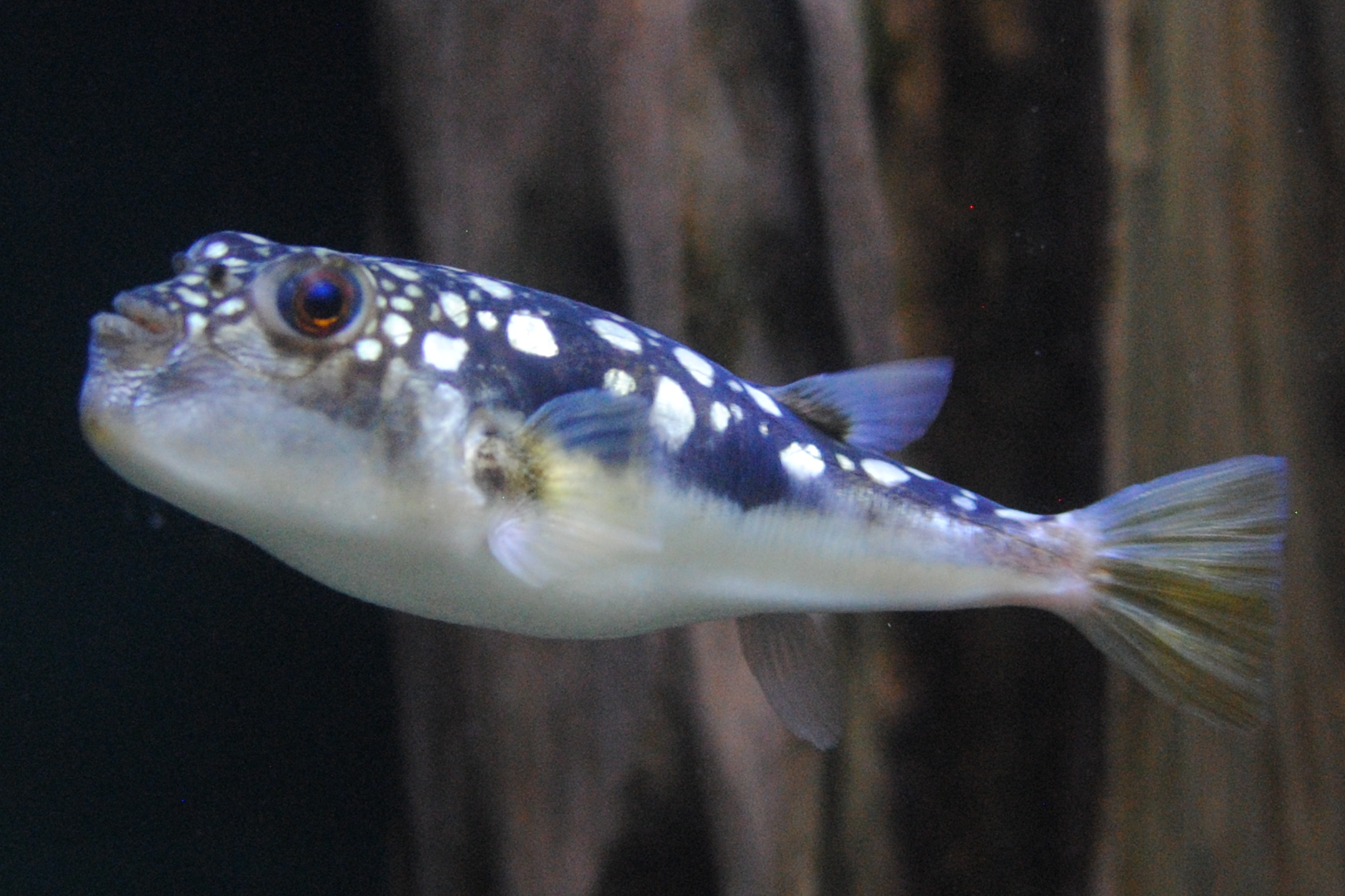
- Amblyrhynchotes honckenii at Two Oceans Aquarium, Cape Town, South Africa

Conservation status
- Least Concern (IUCN 3.1)

Scientific classification
- Kingdom: Animalia
- Phylum: Chordata
- Class: Actinopterygii
- Order: Tetraodontiformes
- Family: Tetraodontidae
- Genus: Amblyrhynchotes
- Species: A. honckenii

Binomial name
- Amblyrhynchotes honckenii (Bloch, 1785)

Synonyms
- Amblyrhynchote honckenii; Lagocephalus blochi Bonaparte, 1841; Sphoeroides honckenii (Bloch, 1785); Tetraodon honckenii Bloch, 1785

= Amblyrhynchotes honckenii =

Species of fish

Amblyrhynchotes honckenii, known as the evileye pufferfish, evileye puffer or evileye blaasop, is a species of fish on the genus Amblyrhynchotes. It was first described by Marcus Elieser Bloch in 1785.

== Description ==
Amblyrhynchotes honckenii has a big head that tapers to a narrow tail. It grows up to 25 cm (9.8 in) long. The head is bluntly rounded with high set eyes and a small mouth. The eyes are deep blue or green in colour with a yellow or orange iris. The upper parts of the body range from black to dark brown to dark green in colour and is covered in pale yellow or white blotches, although juveniles tend to be paler than adults. The lower part of the body is white. Some individuals have a yellow line dividing the darker and paler parts of the body. Both parts are covered in small spikes. These are most noticeable when the fish is inflated, particularly on the stomach.

All the fins are fleshy. The pectoral fins are large and pale yellow. The pectoral and caudal fins are also pale yellow. The anal fins are usually white, but they turn yellow in breeding males.

== Distribution and habitat ==
It is native to the Indo-West Pacific, from South Africa to China. It is most common in areas where the sea floor is covered in fine sand, particularly in areas that are near reefs.

== Ecology ==
This species spends much of its time buried in sand with only the head sticking out. When startled, it will typically inflate and hang in the water before suddenly deflating and rapidly swimming away.

== Toxicity ==
Its flesh is poisonous to humans and other animals. It is also poisonous to humans when touched with bare skin.

== Conservation ==
It is classed as being of "Least Concern" on the IUCN Red List.
