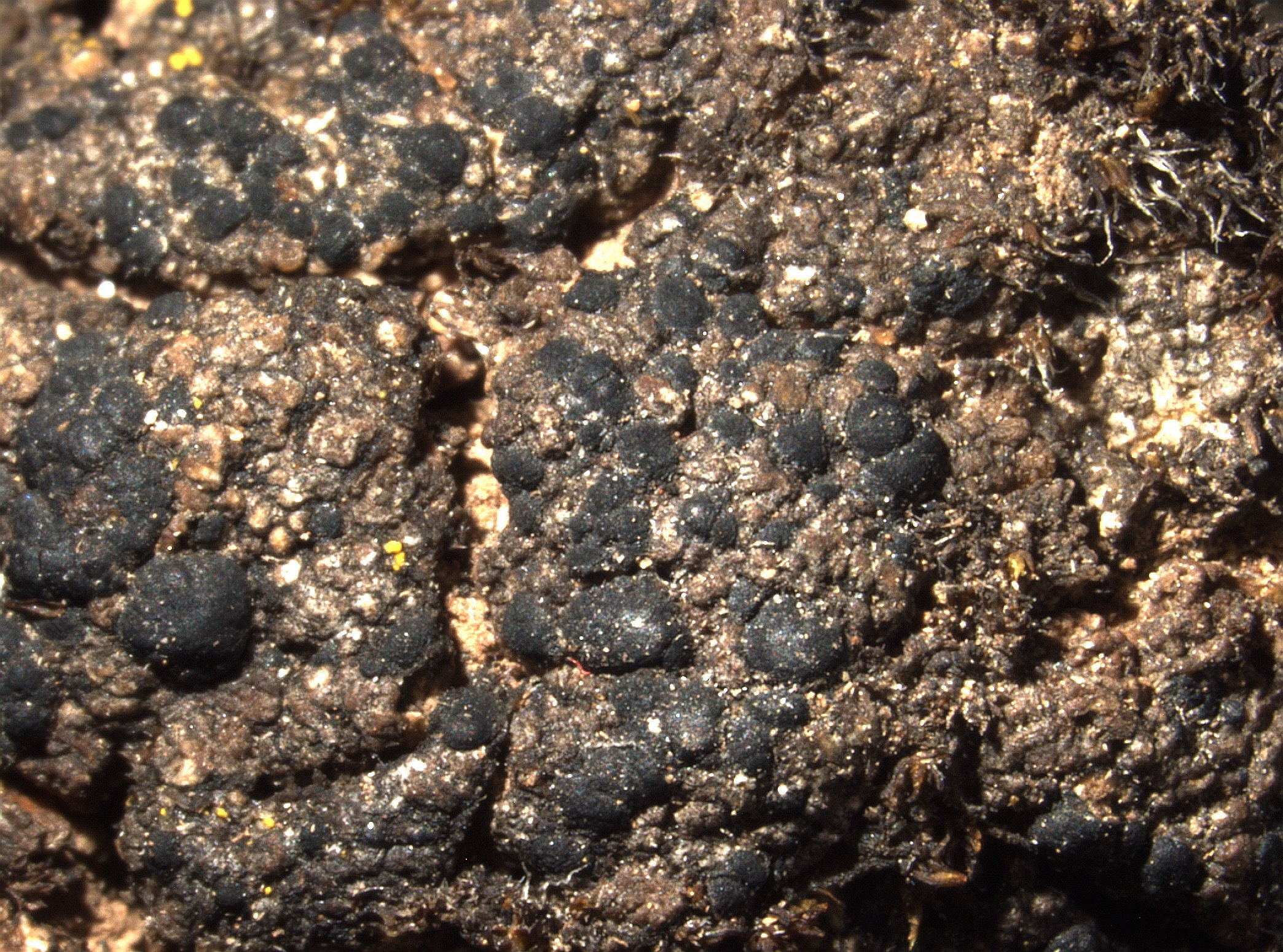

Conservation status
- Apparently Secure (NatureServe)

Scientific classification
- Kingdom: Fungi
- Division: Ascomycota
- Class: Lecanoromycetes
- Order: Lecanorales
- Family: Ramalinaceae
- Genus: Toninia
- Species: T. squalida

Binomial name
- Toninia squalida (Ach.) A.Massal. (1852)

Synonyms
- List: Lecidea squalida Ach. (1810); Lichen peltatus * squalida (Ach.) Lam. (1813); Patellaria squalida (Ach.) Duby (1830); Biatora squalida (Ach.) Hepp (1853); Scolecites squalidus (Ach.) Stizenb. (1862); Psora squalida (Ach.) Acloque (1893); Bilimbia squalida (Ach.) Jatta (1900); Lecidea atrorufa var. squarrosa Ach. (1808); Lichen peltatus var. squarrosa (Ach.) Lam. (1813); Toninia squarrosa (Ach.) Th.Fr. (1874); Syncomista squarrosa (Ach.) Nieuwl. (1916); Toninia havaasii H.Magn. (1949)

= Toninia squalida =

Species of lichen-forming fungus

Toninia squalida is a species of lichen in the family Ramalinaceae. It forms small brown scale-like structures that often merge into crusts, typically growing on calcareous rocks or base-rich soils in upland and arctic regions. The species was first described in 1810 by the Swedish lichenologist Erik Acharius as Lecidea squalida, and was transferred to the genus Toninia by Abramo Bartolommeo Massalongo in 1852. Found across the Northern Hemisphere from temperate mountains to arctic zones, it is a scarce alpine species in Britain, mainly recorded from the Scottish Highlands.

== Taxonomy ==
Toninia squalida was first described scientifically in 1810 by the Swedish lichenologist Erik Acharius under the name Lecidea squalida. In his protologue, Acharius characterised the species by its unequal blackish-grey to brownish granular crust with scattered marginal apothecia, these confluent into irregular black conglomerations with white interiors. He cited previous references by Schleicher and noted its occurrence in the Alps and Switzerland on Schleicher's authority. Acharius distinguished L. squalida from the closely related Lecidea miscella (now also in Toninia) and Lecidea conglomerata, noting differences in crustal morphology, colour, and the nature of the apothecial structure. He observed that whilst the powdery crust seldom forms a distinct thallus as in Lecidea miscella, it can nonetheless be granular and uneven, imbricate, and range from green to ashen-grey or blackish in colour.

Abramo Bartolommeo Massalongo reclassified the species in Toninia in 1852 to give it the binomial name by which it is now known. Massalongo established Toninia as a new genus to accommodate species previously placed in Lecidea and Biatora that shared distinctive characteristics, including solid, plane apothecia with a prominent margin, and ascospores that are oblong to somewhat club-shaped with eight spores per ascus. In describing Toninia squalida, Massalongo characterised it by its grey-brown to olivaceous-grey thallus that is whitish below, cartilaginous, and squamulose to lobate with a wrinkled to plicate surface bearing scattered areoles. He noted the black apothecia with white interiors occurring singly or confluently, with prominent flat margins. Massalongo reported collecting the species on rocks covering an old wooden roof in Verona, and mentioned it had been recorded on Monte Baldo.

== Description ==
The thallus of Toninia squalida is composed of small, scale-like units (squamules) to about 3 mm across that often multiply and coalesce into a more or less continuous crust. Individual squamules are shallowly concave to slightly convex. Their upper surface is brown to dark brown, sometimes with a greyish cast; it is matte rather than frosted (not pruinose) and may show fine cracking. The margins are the same colour as the surface and there are no pseudocyphellae (the tiny pores some lichens have for gas exchange). In section, the upper cortex is 25–100 micrometres (μm) thick and includes a 20–30 μm epinecral layer (a thin skin of dead outer hyphae); calcium oxalate crystals are absent. The lower cortex is pale brown and only weakly developed. The photobiont (green-algal partner) forms a patchy, discontinuous layer, and the medulla lacks crystals.

The fruiting bodies (apothecia) are up to 1.5 mm in diameter, with discs that are flat to slightly convex and again not pruinose. The true exciple (the ring of fungal tissue forming the margin) is indistinct: the rim is dark brown and may appear greenish, while the inner part is pale brown to colourless. Routine spot tests on these pigments give K– reactions; the rim may turn violet with the N (nitric acid) test, and the epithecium (the thin, often green film on top of the disc) is K– but N+ (violet). The spore-bearing layer (hymenium) is clear and 70–80 μm tall, underlain by a colourless to pale brown hypothecium.

Ascospores are needle-like (acicular), measuring 17–45 × 3–5 μm, and are divided by 3–7 cross-walls (septa). No secondary metabolites (lichen products) were detected using thin-layer chromatography.

== Habitat and distribution ==
Toninia squalida is chiefly terricolous, favouring base-rich soils and humus; it also occurs on weathered, slightly calcareous or other base-rich siliceous rocks in dry, upland situations. Young thalli are often intermixed with cyanobacteria or nest within small cyanolichen patches.

In Britain it is a scarce alpine species of calcareous rocks, typically nestled among mosses along damp seepage lines; confirmed records are concentrated in the Scottish Highlands, including Ben Lawers and Caenlochan.

Globally the species ranges broadly across the Northern Hemisphere, extending from temperate uplands into arctic and subarctic zones. It is listed across numerous sectors of the Pan-Arctic, and North American records include Alaskan sites where it grows on soil over rock.
