= Hedinichthys grummorum =

Scientific classification
- Kingdom: Animalia
- Phylum: Chordata
- Class: Actinopterygii
- Order: Cypriniformes
- Family: Nemacheilidae
- Genus: Hedinichthys
- Species: H. grummorum

Binomial name
- Hedinichthys grummorum Prokofiev, 2010

Species of fish

Hedinichthys grummorum is a species of stone loach that is endemic to China. This species reaches a standard length of 4.0 cm (1.6 in).
