= Triplophysa wuweiensis =

Scientific classification
- Kingdom: Animalia
- Phylum: Chordata
- Class: Actinopterygii
- Order: Cypriniformes
- Family: Nemacheilidae
- Genus: Triplophysa
- Species: T. wuweiensis

Binomial name
- Triplophysa wuweiensis (S. C. Li & S. Y. Chang, 1974)

Synonyms
- Nemachilus wuweiensis Li & Chang, 1974 (misspelling); Nemacheilus wuweiensis Li & Chang, 1974

Species of fish

Triplophysa wuweiensis is a species of stone loach endemic to Wuwei, Gansu, China. Type specimen was found in Wuwei, Gansu, China. It grows to 6.1 cm (2.4 in) standard length.
