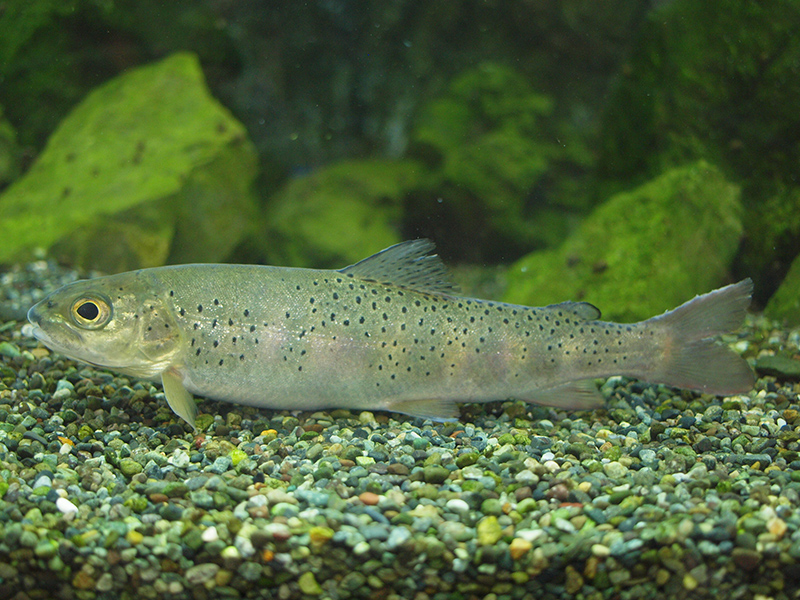
- Brachymystax lenok

Scientific classification
- Kingdom: Animalia
- Phylum: Chordata
- Class: Actinopterygii
- Order: Salmoniformes
- Family: Salmonidae
- Subfamily: Salmoninae
- Genus: Brachymystax; Günther, 1866

Type species
- Salmo lenok Pallas, 1773

Species
- Brachymystax lenok (Pallas, 1773); Brachymystax savinovi Mitrofanov, 1959; Brachymystax tumensis T. Mori, 1930; Brachymystax tsinlingensis S. C. Li, 1966

= Lenok =

Lenok Temporal range: Miocene–Recent

Genus of fishes

Lenoks, otherwise known as Asiatic trout or Manchurian trout, are salmonid fish of the genus Brachymystax, native to rivers and lakes in Mongolia, Kazakhstan, wider Siberia (including Russian Far East), Northern China and Korea.

== Species ==
There are four species in this genus, of which three are listed by FishBase:

- Brachymystax lenok (Pallas, 1773) – sharp-snouted lenok
- Brachymystax savinovi Mitrofanov, 1959
- Brachymystax tumensis T. Mori, 1930 – blunt-snouted lenok

A fourth species, Brachymystax tsinlingensis S. C. Li, 1966, was revalidated in 2015.

Traditionally, only B. lenok was recognized, including both sharp-snouted and blunt-snouted forms. Based on differences in morphology and genetics, the blunt-snouted form was split off as a separate species, B. tumensis. Hybrids between these two are known. The third species, B. savinovi, is sometimes considered a synonym of B. lenok. The name B. savinovi has occasionally been used for the blunt-snouted lenok, but this is incorrect.

== Appearance ==
Lenoks can be sharp-snouted (B. lenok) or blunt-snouted (B. tumensis). Traditionally both these were included in B. lenok, but today they are generally recognized as separate. They are relatively round in shape, and speckled with dark brown spots. Their ventrals are usually colored a reddish hue, and their pectoral fins yellowish. They weigh up to 15 kilograms (33 lb), and can reach a total length of 1.05 m (3.4 ft).

== Habitat, range and status ==
Lenoks tend to live in rivers of any sort, but usually upstream, where the water is colder. They are also found in lakes such as Baikal.

As currently defined, the sharp-snouted lenok (B. lenok) is widespread in central and eastern Russia, and also found widely in northern Mongolia, locally in northeastern Kazakhstan (Irtysh Basin) and northeastern China (Amur Basin). The blunt-snouted lenok (B. tumensis) is found widely in southeastern Russia and more locally in northeastern and central parts of the country, as well as northeastern Mongolia (Amur Basin), northern China and Korea. Although the two generally are found in separate areas, there are also regions where their ranges overlap such as the Amur Basin.

Brachymystax savinovi is found in Markakol Lake and adjacent rivers in eastern Kazakhstan.

The recently revalidated Brachymystax tsinlingensis is distributed in streams in the Yellow and Yangtze River basins in the Qinling Mountains of China.

Though overall widespread, lenoks in South Korea are now on the verge of extinction due to deforestation and they have also declined in China.

== History ==
In the Korean peninsula, lenoks were landlocked inland during the glacial epoch.
