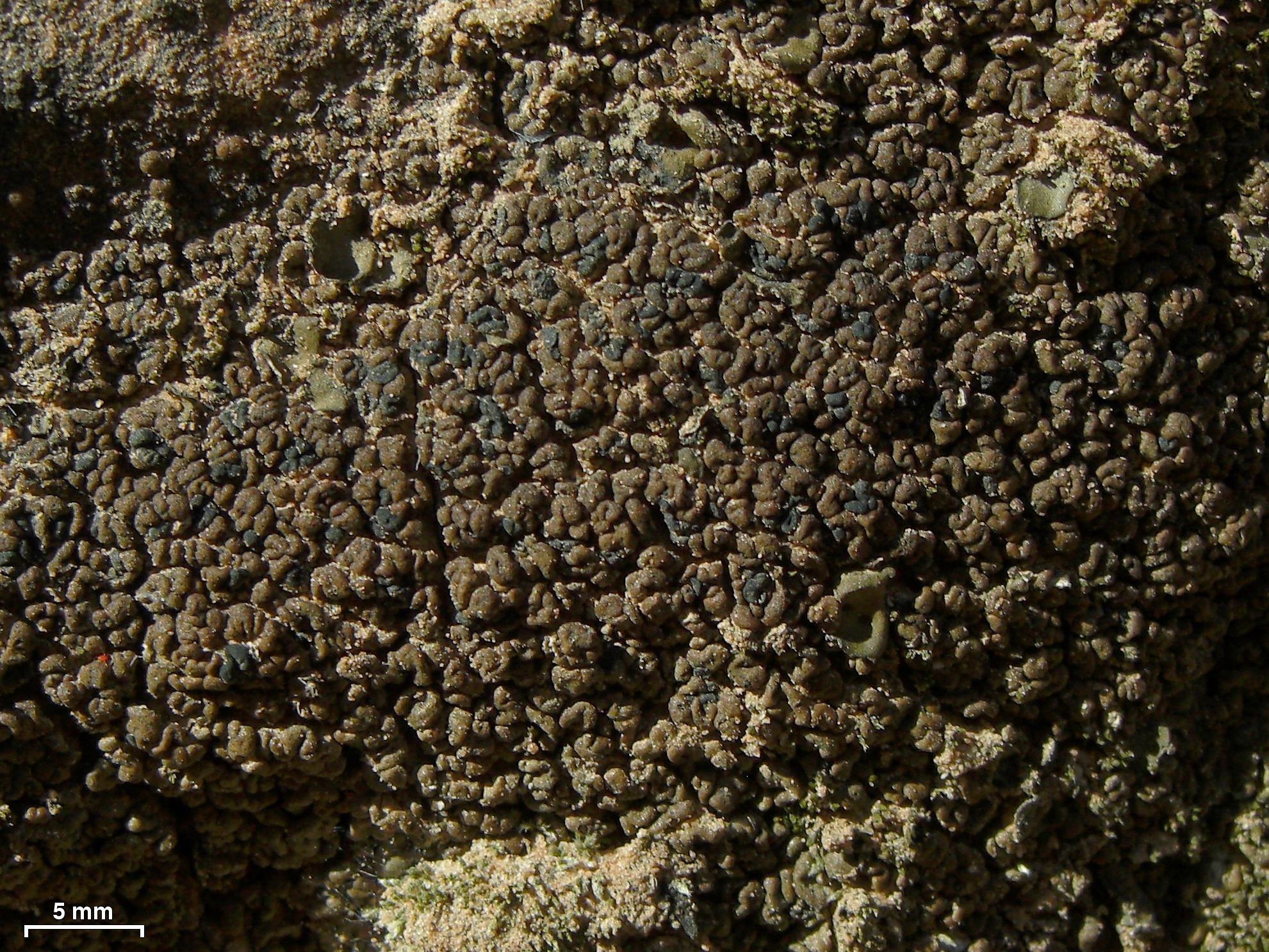
- Toninia tristis

Scientific classification
- Kingdom: Fungi
- Division: Ascomycota
- Class: Lecanoromycetes
- Order: Lecanorales
- Family: Ramalinaceae
- Genus: Toninia; A.Massal. (1852)

Type species
- Toninia cinereovirens (Schaer.) A.Massal. (1852)

Species
- See text

Synonyms
- List: *Arthrosporum A.Massal. (1853); *Bacillina Nyl. (1897); *Diphloeis Clem. (1909); *Diplosis Clem. (1909); *Kiliasia Hafellner (1984); *Leptographa Jatta (1892); *Lobiona H.Kilias & Gotth.Schneid. (1978); *Psora Link (1833); *Scolecites Stizenb. (1862); *Skolekites Norman (1852); *Syncomista Nieuwl. (1916); *Thalloedematomyces E.A.Thomas ex Cif. & Tomas. (1953)

= Toninia =

Genus of lichens

Toninia is a genus of lichen-forming fungi in the family Ramalinaceae. The genus contains about 70 recognised species that are distributed worldwide, with many found in arctic and alpine environments as well as arid regions. These lichens are characterised by their often reduced or scale-like thalli and distinctive black apothecia (fruiting bodies) that typically become convex with age and contain needle-shaped ascospores. Toninia species primarily grow on soil, rocks, and other mineral substrates, and are distinguished from related genera by their spore-producing structures and chemical reactions to standard lichen identification tests.

== Taxonomy ==
The genus was circumscribed by the Italian lichenologist Abramo Bartolommeo Massalongo in 1852, with Toninia cinereovirens assigned as the type species. In his original Latin description, Massalongo established the new genus to accommodate lichens with distinctive characteristics that set them apart from related groups. He described Toninia as having solid, flattened fruiting bodies with a distinctive rim around the edge, and a disc that opens from an initially narrow opening to become wider and more exposed. The thallus (lichen body) was noted to be crusty and scaly, often growing in overlapping patches or forming distinct lobes. Massalongo distinguished his new genus from similar groups like Lecidea and Baeomyces, noting that while Toninia species might resemble some members of these genera, they have unique structural features that warranted separate classification. The genus name honours Carlo Tonini (1920–1982), whom Massalongo described as a celebrated chemist and distinguished cultivator of lichenology.

== Description ==
The thallus (the main lichen body) of Toninia is often reduced or even absent; when present it is usually squamulose, meaning it is made up of small, scale-like pieces that can proliferate and merge into an almost continuous crust. In some species the surface becomes nodular or granular. The upper cortex (the protective skin) ranges from poorly to well developed and may carry a thin epinecral layer (a film of dead, compacted cells); it lacks surface crystals and shows no fissures or pseudocyphellae (tiny breaks in the cortex that look like pores). A lower cortex is weak or missing. The green-algal partner is chlorococcoid; that is, it consists of simple, spherical green cells, arranged either in a continuous band beneath the cortex or in scattered patches. The medulla (internal white tissue) typically lacks crystals.

Fruiting bodies are apothecia (open discs) that are black and not pruinose (they do not carry a pale, dusty bloom). They are usually flat when young but commonly become convex with age. A thalline margin (a rim made from the thallus) is lacking. Instead, the apothecium has a true exciple (a structural rim of fungal tissue) that is initially raised and clear-cut but is often overgrown and excluded later. Microscopically, this exciple is built from radiating, thick-walled, glue-bound hyphae whose cell cavities are rounded to narrowly cylindrical; the inner part is colourless, while the outer edge is dark brown (sometimes with a greenish cast). These tissues lack crystals and have characteristic reactions to standard chemical spot tests: K (potassium hydroxide) negative; N (nitric acid) negative or, more typically, N+ (violet) owing to a pigment sometimes termed "Bagliettoana-green". The epithecium (the film over the spore-bearing layer) is usually olive to green, rarely brown or colourless, also without crystals, K– and usually N+ violet. The hymenium (spore-bearing layer) turns I+ (blue) with iodine, whereas the hypothecium (the tissue below) is colourless to dark brown and contains no crystals. The hamathecium consists of straight paraphyses (sterile threads) that are unbranched or only sparsely branched and sometimes interlinked; they are not cemented together and have thin walls, with the tip cell distinctly swollen and capped by a gelatinous pigment dome.

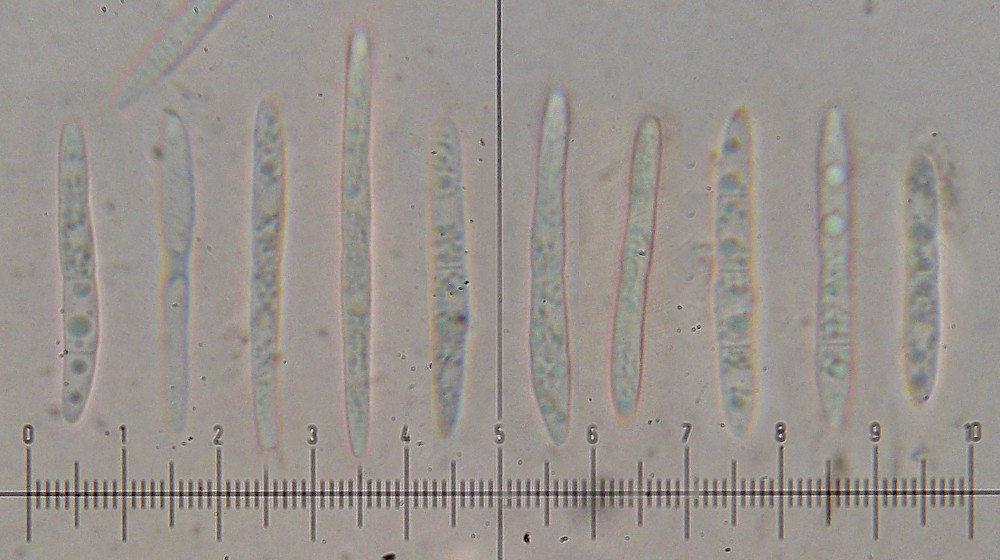
Acicular (needle-shaped) ascospores of Toninia alutacea

The asci are of the Bacidia-type: club-shaped, eight-spored, and sheathed in a gelatinous wall that becomes K/I+ blue (a potassium hydroxide pre-treatment followed by iodine). Each ascus has a well-developed, iodine-positive tholus with a darker-staining central tube and a pronounced ocular chamber (a clear area at the apex involved in spore release). Ascospores are colourless and smooth, ranging from non-septate to 7-septate; shapes vary from ellipsoidal to narrowly spindle-shaped (fusiform) or needle-like (acicular). Asexual structures (conidiomata) are pycnidia that appear black and are immersed to slightly protruding; they produce conidia that are rod-shaped to thread-like. In terms of chemistry, the genus is generally poor in distinctive secondary metabolites: at least one species has been reported with terpenoids, and there are occasional reports of stictic acid and/or xanthones in two taxa that likely do not belong in Toninia and may require exclusion.

== Species ==
- Toninia afferens (Nyl.) Kotlov (2004)
- Toninia alutacea (Anzi) Jatta (1911)
- Toninia arenaria Räsänen (1944)
- Toninia australiensis (Müll.Arg.) Zahlbr. (1926)
- Toninia canadensis (Timdal) Timdal (2024)
- Toninia cinereovirens (Schaer.) A.Massal. (1852)
- Toninia coahuilae (Timdal) Timdal (2024)
- Toninia conjungens Th.Fr. (1867)
- Toninia coquimbensis (Zahlbr.) Kotlov (2004)
- Toninia corallina Timdal (1991)
- Toninia cretzoiui B.de Lesd. (1937)
- Toninia diffracta (A.Massal.) Zahlbr. (1901)
- Toninia efferens (Nyl.) Kotlov (2004)
- Toninia flavida Tomin (1950)
- Toninia fujikawae (M.Satô) Timdal (2024)
- Toninia gigantea (Timdal) Timdal (2024)
- Toninia groenlandica Lynge (1937)
- Toninia guaranitica Malme (1937)
- Toninia hercegovinica Zahlbr. (1908)
- Toninia heterochroma I.M.Lamb (1939)
- Toninia himalayana Timdal (1991)
- Toninia isidiata Malme (1937)
- Toninia janeirensis Riddle (1912)
- Toninia johnstonii C.W.Dodge (1948)
- Toninia kerguelensis C.W.Dodge (1948)
- Toninia leucina (Müll.Arg.) Zahlbr. (1926)
- Toninia lobothalliae Y.Joshi (2022)
- Toninia loitlesbergeri Zahlbr. (1904)
- Toninia melanocarpizans Zahlbr. (1918)
- Toninia meridionalis B.de Lesd. (1923)
- Toninia mesoidea (Nyl.) Zahlbr. (1926)
- Toninia mexicana B.de Lesd. (1909)
- Toninia muricola B.de Lesd. (1948)
- Toninia nashii Timdal (2002)
- Toninia ochracea Werner (1937)
- Toninia olivaceoatra H.Magn. (1944)
- Toninia pakistanica M.S.Iqbal & Khalid (2023)
- Toninia plumbina (Anzi) Hafellner & Timdal (1991)
- Toninia poeltiana S.Y.Kondr., Lőkös & Hur (2016)
- Toninia poeltii Timdal (1991)
- Toninia populorum (A.Massal.) Kistenich, Timdal, Bendiksby & S.Ekman (2018)
- Toninia potieri Maheu & Werner (1934)
- Toninia pseudotabacina (Timdal) Timdal (2024)
- Toninia pulvinata (Mudd) H.Olivier (1911)
- Toninia sbarbaronis B.de Lesd. (1935)
- Toninia schafeevii Tomin (1950)
- Toninia scholanderi (Lynge) Timdal (2024)
- Toninia scorigena (Müll.Arg.) Lumbsch & Messuti (1999)
- Toninia squalescens (Nyl.) Th.Fr. (1874)
- Toninia squalida (Ach.) A.Massal. (1852)
- Toninia subcandida B.de Lesd. (1906)
- Toninia subdispersa (Nyl.) K.Knudsen (2007)
- Toninia subfuscae (Arnold ex Zwackh) Timdal (1991)
- Toninia submesoidea van den Boom (2017)
- Toninia subnitida (Hellb.) Hafellner & Türk (2001)
- Toninia subpersonata Malme (1937)
- Toninia subtalparum van den Boom (2004)
- Toninia talparum Timdal (1991)
- Toninia tecta C.A.Morse & Ladd (2018)
- Toninia thalloedaemiformis (Szatala) Timdal (2024)
- Toninia thiopsora (Nyl.) H.Olivier (1911)
- Toninia tristis (Th.Fr.) Th.Fr. (1874)
- Toninia ualae Etayo (2008)
- Toninia verrucariae (Nyl.) Timdal (1992)
- Toninia violacea B.de Lesd. (1910)
- Toninia wetmorei Timdal (2002)
