= Hedinichthys yarkandensis =

Scientific classification
- Kingdom: Animalia
- Phylum: Chordata
- Class: Actinopterygii
- Order: Cypriniformes
- Family: Nemacheilidae
- Genus: Hedinichthys
- Species: H. yarkandensis

Binomial name
- Hedinichthys yarkandensis (F. Day, 1877)

Synonyms
- Nemacheilus yarkandensis Day, 1877; Barbatula yarkandensis (Day, 1877); Triplophysa yarkandensis (Day, 1877); Triplophysa yarkandensis yarkandensis (Day, 1877); Nemachilus yarkandensis Day, 1877

Species of fish

Hedinichthys yarkandensis, the Kashgarian loach, is a species of stone loach. It is found in the Tarim River basin.

== Description ==
Hedinichthys yarkandensis reaches a total length of 30.0 cm (11.8 in).
