= Gariwangsan =

Mountain in Gangwon Province, South Korea

Highest point
- Elevation: 1,560.6 m (5,120 ft)
- Coordinates: 37°27′41″N 128°33′48″E

Geography
- Location: South Korea

Korean name
- Hangul: 가리왕산
- Hanja: 加里王山
- RR: Gariwangsan
- MR: Kariwangsan

Gariwangsan (Korean: 가리왕산) is a mountain between the counties of Jeongseon and Pyeongchang, Gangwon Province, South Korea. It has an elevation of 1,560.6 m (5,120 ft).

A skiing area hosted skiing events for the 2018 Winter Olympics in Pyeongchang County.

== See also ==
- List of mountains in Korea
