= Amblyrhynchotes rufopunctatus =

Scientific classification
- Domain: Eukaryota
- Kingdom: Animalia
- Phylum: Chordata
- Class: Actinopterygii
- Order: Tetraodontiformes
- Family: Tetraodontidae
- Genus: Amblyrhynchotes
- Species: A. rufopunctatus

Binomial name
- Amblyrhynchotes rufopunctatus Li, 1962

Synonyms
- Amblyrhynchotes hypselogenion rufopunctatus; Amblyrhynchotus rufopunctatus

Species of fish

Amblyrhynchotes rufopunctatus is a species of pufferfish in the family Tetraodontidae. It has been reported only from the South China Sea, and it is of uncertain status, with FishBase and the Catalogue of Life both stating that confirmation work is required to determine its existence as a species.
