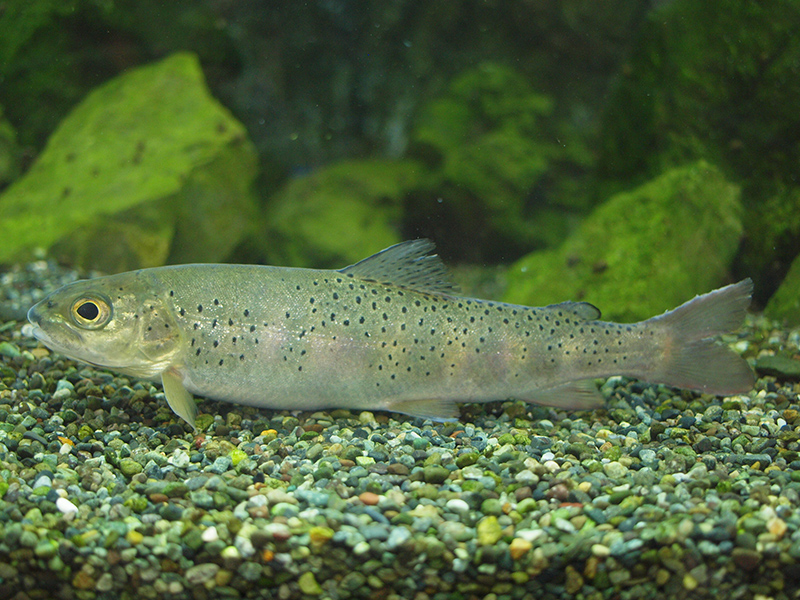

Conservation status
- Least Concern (IUCN 3.1)

Scientific classification
- Kingdom: Animalia
- Phylum: Chordata
- Class: Actinopterygii
- Order: Salmoniformes
- Family: Salmonidae
- Genus: Brachymystax
- Species: B. lenok

Binomial name
- Brachymystax lenok (Pallas, 1773)

Synonyms
- Salmo lenok Pallas, 1773; Salmo coregonoides Pallas, 1814; Brachymystax coregonoides (Pallas, 1814); Brachymystax lenok tsinlingensis Li, 1966

= Brachymystax lenok =

Species of fish

Brachymystax lenok, the sharp-snouted lenok or yeolmogeo, is a salmonid fish distributed in rivers and lakes in northeastern Asia. It formerly included the blunt-snouted lenok, but recent authorities typically treat the latter as a separate species, B. tumensis, based on differences in morphology and genetics.

As presently defined, the sharp-snouted lenok is widespread in central and eastern Russia, and also found widely in northern Mongolia, locally in northeastern Kazakhstan (Irtysh Basin) and northeastern China (Amur Basin). The blunt-snouted lenok (B. tumensis) is found widely in southeastern Russia and more locally in northeastern and central parts of the country, as well as northeastern Mongolia (Amur Basin), northern China and Korea. Although the two generally are found in separate areas, there are also regions where their ranges overlap such as the Amur Basin.

The sharp-snouted lenok is widespread overall, but some populations, especially in China, have declined due to overexploitation and pollution. This species grows to a total length of 70 cm (28 in).

Korea is considered to be the southernmost limit of this fish, and in South Korea, various places have been declared protected areas for its protection: 2.36 km^{2} in Jeongseon, 24.23 km^{2} in Bonghwa, and in Hongcheon.
