= Hedinichthys minuta =

Scientific classification
- Kingdom: Animalia
- Phylum: Chordata
- Class: Actinopterygii
- Order: Cypriniformes
- Family: Nemacheilidae
- Genus: Hedinichthys
- Species: H. minuta

Binomial name
- Hedinichthys minuta (S. C. Li, 1966)

Synonyms
- Nemachilus minutus Li, 1966; Triplophysa minuta (Li, 1966)

Species of fish

Hedinichthys minuta is a species of ray-finned fish in the genus Hedinichthys, which is classified in the family Nemacheilidae, the stone loaches. This species is indigenous to Sinkiang but has been introduced elsewhere in northern China.
