= Jeongseon-eup =

Jeongseon
- Town
- Panoramic view of Jeongseon-eup

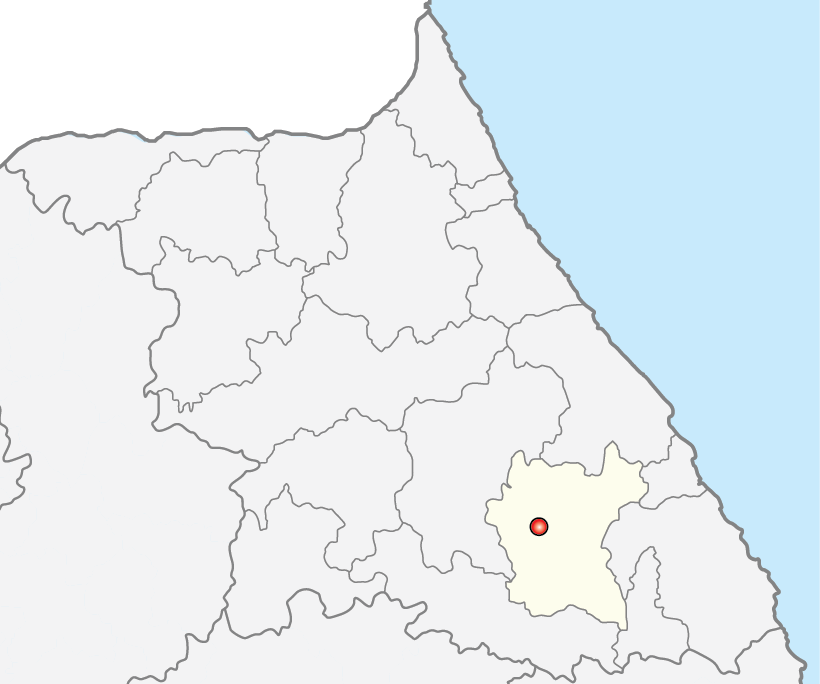
- Country: South Korea
- Region: Gwandong

Population
  - Dialect: Gangwon

Korean name
- Hangul: 정선읍
- Hanja: 旌善邑
- RR: Jeongseon-eup
- MR: Chŏngsŏn-ŭp

Jeongseon-eup (Korean: 정선읍) is a town in Jeongseon County, Gangwon Province, South Korea. It is famous for the three day "Jeongseon Arirang Festival," held every fall. Jeongseon is also famous for its 5 Day Market (5일장) which offers up a variety of traditional Korean herbs, vegetables, and traditional medicines.

The city is also home to Jeongseon Stadium which hosts WK-League soccer matches weekly starting Summer of 2012.

== See also ==
- List of cities in South Korea
