= Li Sizhong (ichthyologist) =

Chinese ichthyologist

Li, Sizhong
- Born: February 19, 1921; Huixian, Henan Province
- Died: January 11, 2009 (aged 87); Beijing
- Citizenship: China
- Education: Beijing Normal University
- Scientific career
- Fields: Ichthyologist
- Workplaces: Institute of Zoology, Chinese Academy of Sciences
- Author abbrev. (zoology): Li

Li Sizhong (Chinese: 李思忠; Wade–Giles: Li Sze-Chung; February 19, 1921 – January 11, 2009) was an ichthyologist with the Institute of Zoology (中国科学院动物研究所) at the Chinese Academy of Sciences. Throughout his research career, he made numerous discoveries of new fish species (or subspecies), and published many books and research papers describing the fauna and geographical distribution of fishes in China and beyond. He translated and helped publication of the Chinese editions of Fishes of the World (2nd edition, by Joseph S. Nelson) and Fish Migration (a popular science book by Russian zoologist Peter Schmidt). Li was the major author of two published volumes in the Fauna Sinica monograph series, systematically reviewing and describing orders of bony fishes that include flat fish, cod, silverside, pearlfish, killifish, flying fish, etc. in or near China. He had authored at least 60 academic papers, written over 40 popular science articles about fish on Chinese newspapers and magazines, and been responsible for compiling and editing fish-related entries in several standard reference books (including Encyclopedia of China and Zhonghua Dadian). His works on freshwater ichthyofauna of China as well as other aspects of ichthyology (such as fish taxonomy, geographical distribution and habitats, and evolution) are considered to be among some of the most notable in the Chinese ichthyology literature. He was an early advocate of aquaculture on alkali or saline-alkali land, as part of a promising strategy of utilizing non-arable land for fish and crustacean farming, leveraging the water to manage salts and potentially remediating saline-alkali soils over time through organic inputs in integrated farming.

== Career and research ==
=== Overview ===
After finishing studies at Jixian County School of Teachers in Henan Province from 1937 to 1940, he was admitted to the Fushengzhuang business personnel training class of the Agricultural Bureau of the Ministry of Economic Affairs, and then worked as a grassroots staff member of Fushengzhuang in Hancheng and other places. In 1942, he entered the Biology Department of Northwest Normal University in Lanzhou to study. After graduating in 1946, he successively worked at Kaifeng Liming Middle School and Hebei Luanxian School of Teachers. After the summer of 1947, he went to Shenyang at the invitation of his friend Bo Yang. At that time, the National Changbai Normal University moved from Jilin to Shenyang due to the civil war between the Kuomintang and the Communist Party, and taught vertebrate zoology at the school. In the summer of 1948, Changbai Normal University moved south to Beiping, where he was admitted to the Graduate School of Beijing Normal University and served as a teaching assistant at the Normal University. He studied under Professor Zhang Chunlin, a pioneer in ichthyology research in China. Li graduated in May 1950, and initially worked in the Compilation and Translation Bureau of the Chinese Academy of Sciences (the predecessor of the Science Press) led by Yang Zhongjian. Li initially worked on Chinese nomenclature of vertebrates, specializing in fishes. Within five years, a standard reference on Chinese nomenclature of vertebrates was published, with a select group of Chinese zoologists as co-authors and contributors. Among them, Li and his mentor Tchang Chun-Lin, along with Chu Yuan-Ting, were responsible for standardization of fish nomenclature in the Chinese language.

In October 1950, the Zoological Specimen Working Committee of the Chinese Academy of Sciences (the predecessor of the Institute of Zoology) was established in Xijiao Park, Beijing, with Chen Zhen as the leader. Li was transferred to this committee, joining a team of zoologists (including Tso-hsin Cheng) engaged in consolidating and sorting out zoological specimen inherited from Fan Memorial Institute of Biology and National Academy of Peiping, two predecessors of the Academy of Sciences, in preparation of the later formation of the Institute of Zoology. He was responsible full-time for the sorting and integration of zoological specimens.

Later in 1951, he was invited by Yang Fuqing, then director of the Fisheries Bureau of Hebei Province, to participate in the survey of fish and fisheries along the coast of Hebei. Expanding on the work, he and his mentor Zhang Chunlin initiated and participated in China's earliest systematic marine fish survey starting in 1950s, producing publications such as the "Survey Report on Fishes from the Yellow and Bohai Seas" (published in 1955), "Fishes of the South China Sea" (1962), "Marine fishes in vicinity of the South China Sea Islands" (1979) and "Systematic Synopsis of Chinese Fishes" (1987), etc. He was the chief editor of "Fishes of Xinjiang" (1979). "Fauna of China: Pleuronectiformes" (1995) written by him is the earliest published volume of the fish series of Fauna Sinica (Fauna of China).

Starting from the early 1950s, Li helped to initiate and participated in China's systematic surveys of marine fishes in Bohai Sea, Yellow Sea and South China Sea, along China's coast. His scientific career, however, was interrupted in 1957 when he was labelled a "rightist" during the Anti-Rightist Movement. From then until the mid-1970s, while his research and publication capacity had been severely impacted by whims of political campaigns and turmoils, he managed to conduct surveys of freshwater fishes in the Yellow River, Ou River and Ling River, as well as in endorheic regionssuch as Xinjiang and Gansu provinces in Western China. While blacklisted as a "rightist" and assigned to work on aquaculture-related research in the early 1960s, he discovered a salmonid fish serendipitously in the vicinity of Qinling Mountains (considered to be a glacial refugium roughly in central part of China), which is later named Brachymystax tsinlingensis Li, 1966. For a relatively tranquil period of about a year before the Cultural Revolution, he was allowed to publish research results related to the salmonid fish, fishes in the Yellow River, and earlier surveys of marine fishes. But only until after rehabilitation in 1978, Li was able to resume normal research activities.

After the Anti-Rightist Campaign in 1957, he suffered injustice for a long time. Several of the most important works in his life (including the discovery of several new species of fish and the writing of the representative monograph on the zoogeography of freshwater fishes "Studies on zoogeographical divisions for fresh water fishes of China") were accomplished in adversity. When the writer Bo Yang left Shenyang in November 1948 and passed through Peking, he temporarily stayed at Li Sizhong's residence in the graduate dormitory of the Normal University; when he returned to the mainland in October 1988, he met Li Sizhong in Beijing. Tai Hou wrote an article in the Human World Supplement of China Times, describing the reunion of two fellow countrymen and friends after nearly forty years apart.

Two of Li's books are published posthumously. In Fishes of the Yellow River and Beyond, he described over 170 native fish species and the characteristics of fish distribution in the Yellow River and its tributaries; a collection of his papers and popular science articles, as well as a personal memoir, are also included in the posthumous book published in Taiwan; this book was re-published in the mainland in 2017. Comparing fish species in the Yellow River in 2010–2015 and the survey results originally reported by Li in 1965 as part of his research on the book, two recent Chinese studies conclude that only about half of the native fishes in the Yellow River could still be found, due to causes such as anthropogenic environmental alterations and increased presence of introduced species over the past half-century. Li was also the primary contributor to a volume of the Fauna Sinica series covering the orders of Atheriniformes, Cyprinodontiformes, Beloniformes, Ophidiiformes and Gadiformes, which was published posthumously in 2011. Another volume of the Fauna Sinica series which he worked on during his last years, covering fish species in China within the orders of Beryciformes, Zeiformes, Lampriformes, Gasterosteiformes, Mugiliformes and Synbranchiformes (such as soldierfish, dory, opah, ribbonfish, stickleback, mullet, swamp eel, etc.), is yet to be published.

=== Systematic studies of flatfishes ===
Li's works on flatfishes are among the most comprehensive morphological or osteological studies of flatfishes in modern times, and cited by Joseph S. Nelson's Fishes of the World. Among his findings, he concluded through systematic comparisons that spiny turbots are the most primitive family of flatfishes. This conclusion is consistent with later phylogenic studies based on molecular biology.

=== Zoogeographical distribution of freshwater fishes of China ===
In his book Studies on zoogeographical divisions for fresh water fishes of China, Li divided the fauna of freshwater fishes in China into five major regions based on characteristics of fish species distributions, geographic environments and geological histories of these regions. The five freshwater regions in China are: (1) Northern region containing upper reaches of rivers that flow into the Arctic Ocean, as well as Amur River and its tributaries; (2) Western China region; (3) Mongolian Plateau; (4) Eastern China region; and (5) Southern China region. According to his method, the demarcation line between Holarctic and Indomalayan realms in China, as far as freshwater fishes are concerned, lies largely along the Himalayas and Nanling Mountainsranges, where the Southern China region is basically on the south side of the Nanling Mountains, a drainage divide between the Yangtze River and the Pearl River. This idea is close to those of Wallace and Mori, and contrasts with the prevalent view of demarcation line for terrestrial animals between Holarctic and Indomalaya regions along the Qinling Mountains (known as Qinling–Huaihe Line, though the Qinling Mountains does not extend into Eastern part of China). Freshwater Ecoregions of the World (FEOW), a collaborative global biodiversity project partly sponsored by World Wide Fund for Nature (WWF), cites this book as a source of references in delineation of freshwater ecoregions of China.

In 1989, he, Sun Ruyong and Yao Hongzhen jointly put forward a proposal in the "Business Times" to comprehensively manage saline-alkali lands by combining the cultivation of agricultural and forestry products with the cultivation of marine fish, shrimp, brackish-water fish or freshwater fish. Academic data and breeding practices published over the past thirty years show that their suggestions have considerable feasibility and development potential. Since 1990s, research and experimentation have been conducted in China for remediation and utilization of alkali land through combined agriculture and aquaculture practices, with considerable success. In recent years, aquaculture has been recommended by the Ministry of Agriculture and Rural Affairs of China as a successful model for the transformation and utilization of saline-alkali land. FAO noted in a recent newsletter that alkaline land is one area that there are innovative ways and opportunities for aquaculture to expand.

=== Fishes of the Yellow River ===
His posthumous book "Fishes of the Yellow River and Beyond" was published in Taiwan in November 2015. It systematically describes more than 170 species of indigenous fish in the Yellow River Basin and explores the evolution of the Yellow River fish fauna from a zoogeographic perspective. In addition, it included more than 50 ichthyology papers, prefaces, reviews, popular science essays, and memories by the author; the revised version of this book was published in mainland China by Ocean University of China Press at the end of 2017. Li Sizhong's systematic survey of fish species in the Yellow River started more than 60 years ago and the survey of fishery resources in the Yellow River system had been led by He Zhihui in the 1980s. These studies have contributed to the study of changes in fish biodiversity in the Yellow River over more than half a century and the profound impact of human activities on aquatic ecology. They serve as rare historical information and baseline materials for the evaluation of the degree of effectiveness of relevant environmental and ecological protection measures. Comparing fish species in the Yellow River in 2010–2015 and the survey results originally reported by Li in 1965 as part of his research on the book, two recent Chinese studies conclude that only about half of the native fishes in the Yellow River could still be found, due to anthropogenic environmental alterations and increased presence of introduced species over the past half-century.

Based on the distribution characteristics of the Yellow River fish populations, the geological history and natural landmarks of the Yellow River Basin, he believed that the Heishan Gorge (at the junction of Gansu and Ningxia) and the boundary between the northeastern edge of the Qinghai-Tibet Plateau and the Weining Plain outlet, can be used as the boundary between the upper reaches and the middle reaches of the Yellow River; Hukou Waterfall can be used as the boundary between the middle reaches and the lower reaches of the Yellow River. The upper reaches of the Yellow River flow through the mountains of the Qinghai-Tibet Plateau, the alpine swamp grasslands and its northeastern edge. It belongs to the Qinghai-Tibet Plateau sub-region and Longxi Asia region in the geographical distribution of freshwater fish in China; the middle reaches running through the Ningmeng Plateau, Ordos Plateau, and Loess Plateau, correspond to the Hetao sub-region of the Ningmeng Plateau area; the lower reaches flow through low-altitude valleys such as the Fenwei Basin, Shanxi-Henan Gorge, and the North China Plain, corresponding to the East China River-Plain Sub-region.

=== Uncovering fish records in ancient documents ===
Li Sizhong believes that the Chinese nation's love for fish has two meanings: first, it has developed fishing, hunting and breeding very early, and likes to eat edible fish; second, it loves fish-related customs and cultural activities. For example, there are a large number of fish-related stories in ancient Chinese literature, named characters and observations about fish. He attaches great importance to studying the records of fish in ancient Chinese works to examine the natural geographical distribution of indigenous fish before the impact of human activities (such as introduction and transplantation, canal digging, etc.). He co-wrote a paper with Fang Fang Kullander on the natural distribution of the four major carps. It is widely cited by scholars in the fields of geography, aquaculture and aquatic ecological protection.

== Fish species discovered or named ==
- Callionymus koreanus (Nakabo, Jeon & Li, 1987)
- Amblyrhynchotes rufopunctatus (Li, 1962)
- Callionymus hainanensis Li, 1966
- Triplophysa minuta (Li, 1966) (Note: On the second-level protection list of endangered and protected species of China (2021 edition))
- Callionymus recurvispinnis (Li, 1966)
- Cottus sibiricus altaicus (Li & Ho, 1966)
- Brachymystax lenok tsinlingensis Li, 1966
- Gymnocypris chilianensis (Li & Chang, 1974)
- Triplophysa wuweiensis (Li & Chang, 1974)
- Psettina filimana Li & Wang, 1981
- Lepidotrigla lepidojugulata Li, 1981
- Lepidotrigla longimana Li, 1981
- Ciliata tchangi Li, 1994
- Melanonus okamurai Li, 2011
- Gobio tchangi Li, 2015
