= Gangwon dialect =

Dialect of the Korean language

Gangwon
- Kangwŏn
- Native to: North Korea, South Korea
- Region: Gangwon Province (ROK), Kangwŏn Province (DPRK)
- Native speakers: c. 1.5 million (2014)
- Language family: Koreanic: Korean; Central; Gangwon
- Dialects: Yeongdong; Yeongseo

Language codes
- ISO 639-3: –
- IETF: ko-u-sd-kr42 (ROK) ko-u-sd-kp07 (DPRK)

The Gangwon dialect (Korean: 강원 방언) is spoken in South Korea's Gangwon Province and in North Korea's Kangwŏn Province. Although they are large provinces by area, relatively few people lived in the Gangwon Province. As a result, people living in the western side of Gangwon (Yeongseo) did not develop a highly distinctive dialect. However, the part of Gangwon that stretches along the eastern coast of Korea's Yeongdong region did develop a distinctive dialect. This is because the Taebaek Mountains bisect the Gangwon Province, and the people living eastern Gangwon were therefore isolated.

Distinguishing features of the Gangwon dialect:

1. ㅆ (ss) is pronounced as ㅅ (s).
2. The standard 아 (ah) sound is changed to 어 (eo) at the end of sentences.
3. Questions may end in 나 (na), -노 (no), -고 (go), -가 (ga).
