= List of cities and counties of North Gyeongsang Province =

North Gyeongsang Province is divided into 10 cities (si) and 13 counties (gun). Listed below is each entity's name in English, hangul and hanja.

== Cities ==
- Andong (안동시; 安東市, capital)
- Gimcheon (김천시; 金泉市)
- Gumi (구미시; 龜尾市)
- Gyeongju (경주시; 慶州市)
- Gyeongsan (경산시; 慶山市)
- Mungyeong (문경시; 聞慶市)
- Pohang (포항시; 浦項市)
- Sangju (상주시; 尙州市)
- Yeongcheon (영천시; 永川市)
- Yeongju (영주시; 榮州市)

== Counties ==
- Bonghwa County (봉화군; 奉化郡)
- Cheongdo County (청도군; 淸道郡)
- Cheongsong County (청송군; 靑松郡)
- Chilgok County (칠곡군; 漆谷郡)
- Goryeong County (고령군; 高靈郡)
- Gunwi County (군위군; 軍威郡)
- Seongju County (성주군; 星州郡)
- Uiseong County (의성군; 義城郡)
- Uljin County (울진군; 蔚珍郡)
- Ulleung County (울릉군; 鬱陵郡)
- Yecheon County (예천군; 醴泉郡)
- Yeongdeok County (영덕군; 盈德郡)
- Yeongyang County (영양군; 英陽郡)

== List by population and area ==
Name	Population (2013)	Area (km²)	Population Density (/km²)
Andong	167,826	1,590.91	105.5
Gimcheon	135,191	1,009.5	133.9
Gumi	417,708	616.25	677.8
Gyeongju	263,704	1,324.39	199.1
Gyeongsan	247,613	411.58	601.6
Mungyeong	75,749	91.73	825.8
Pohang	519,060	1,127.24	460.5
Sangju	103,950	1,254.82	82.8
Yeongcheon	101,295	919.76	110.1
Yeongju	112,482	668.45	168.3
Bonghwa County	33,936	1,201	28.3
Cheongdo County	43,787	696.53	62.9
Cheongsong County	26,432	842.45	31.4
Chilgok County	120,135	451	266.4
Goryeong County	35,281	383.7	91.9
Gunwi County	24,104	614.15	39.2
Seongju County	44,824	616.28	72.7
Uiseong County	56,777	1,175.89	48.3
Uljin County	51,723	989.06	52.3
Ulleung County	10,557	72.518	145.6
Yecheon County	45,948	660.7	69.5
Yeongdeok County	40,213	741.05	54.3
Yeongyang County	18,259	815.14	22.4

== General information ==
Municipal	Subdivisions	Image	Location
Andong	Pungsan-eup; Waryeong-myeon; Bukhu-myeon; Seohu-myeon; Pungcheon-myeon; Iljik-myeon; Namhu-myeon; Namseon-myeon; Imha-myeon; Giran-myeon; Imdong-myeon; Yean-myeon; Dosan-myeon; Nokjeon-myeon; Junggu-dong; Myeongryun-dong; Yongsang-dong; Seogu-dong; Taehwa-dong; Pyeonghwa-dong; Angi-dong; Ok-dong; Songha-dong; Gangnam-dong		
Gimcheon	Apo-eup; Nongso-myeon; Nam-myeon; Gaeryeong-myeon; Gammun-myeon; Eomo-myeon; Bongsan-myeon; Daehang-myeon; Gamcheon-myeon; Joma-myeon; Guseong-myeon; Nongso-myeon; Buhang-myeon; Daedeok-myeon; Jeungsan-myeon; Jasan-dong; Pyeonghwa Namsan-dong; Yanggeum-dong; Daesin-dong; Daegeok-dong; Jijwa-dong; Yulgok-dong		
Gumi	Seonsan-eup; Goa-eup; Sandong-eup; Mueul-myeon; Okseong-myeon; Dogae-myeon; Haepyeong-myeon; Jangcheon-myeon; Songjeong-dong; Wonpyeong-dong; Doryang-dong; Jisan-dong; Seongjuwonnam-dong; Hyeonggok 1(il)-dong; Hyeonggok 2(i)-dong; Sinpyeong 1(il)-dong; Sinpyeong 2(i)-dong; Bisan-dong; Gongdan-dong; Gwangpyeong-dong; Sangmosagok-dong; Imo-dong; Indong-dong; Jinmi-dong; Yangpo-dong		
Gyeongju	Angang-eup; Gampo-eup; Oedong-eup; Geoncheon-eup; Sannae-myeon; Seo-myeon; Hyeongok-myeon; Gangdong-myeon; Cheonbuk-myeon; Yangbuk-myeon; Yangnam-myeon; Naenam-myeon; Seondo-dong; Seonggeon-dong; Hwangseong-dong; Yonggang-dong; Bodeok-dong; Bulguk-dong; Hwangnam-dong; Jungbu-dong; Hwango-dong; Dongcheon-dong; Wolseong-dong		
Gyeongsan	Hayang-eup; Jillyang-eup; Amnyang-eup; Wachon-myeon; Jain-myeon; Yongseong-myeon; Namsan-myeon; Namcheon-myeon; Jungang-dong; Dongbu-dong; Seobu 1-dong; Seobu 2-dong; Nambu-dong; Bukbu-dong; Jungbang-dong		
Mungyeong	Mungyeong-eup; Gaeun-eup; Yeongsun-myeon; Sanyang-myeon; Hogye-myeon; Sanbuk-myeon; Dongno-myeon; Maseong-myeon; Nongam-myeon; Jeomchon 1(il)-dong; Jeomchon 2(i)-dong; Jeomchon 3(sam)-dong; Jeomchon 4(sa)-dong; Jeomchon 5(o)-dong		
Pohang	Buk District; Heunghae-eup; Singwang-myeon; Cheongha-myeon; Songra-myeon; Gigye-myeon; Jukjang-myeon; Gibuk-myeon; Jungang-dong; Yanghak-dong; Jukdo-dong; Yongheung-dong; Uchang-dong; Duho-dong; Jangryang-dong; Hwanyeo-dong; Nam District; Guryongpo-eup; Yeonil-eup; Ocheon-eup; Daesong-myeon; Donghae-myeon; Janggi-myeon; Homigot-myeon; Sangdae-dong; Haedo-dong; Songdo-dong; Cheongnim-dong; Jecheol-dong; Hyogok-dong; Daei-dong		
Sangju	Hamchang-eup; Sabeol-myeon; Jungdong-myeon; Nakdong-myeon; Cheongni-myeon; Gongseong-myeon; Oenam-myeon; Naeseo-myeon; Modong-myeon; Moseo-myeon; Hwadong-myeon; Hwaseo-myeon; Hwabuk-myeon; Oeseo-myeon; Euncheok-myeon; Gonggeom-myeon; Ian-myeon; Hwanam-myeon; Namwon-dong; Bukmun-dong; Gyerim-dong; Dongmun-dong; Dongseong-dong; Sinheung-dong		
Yeongcheon	Geumho-eup; Cheongtong-myeon; Sinnyeong-myeon; Hwasan-myeon; Hwabuk-myeon; Hwanam-myeon; Jayang-myeon; Imgo-myeon; Gogyeong-myeong; Bugan-myeon; Daechang-myeon; Dongbu-dong; Jungang-dong; Seobu-dong; Wansan-dong; Nambu-dong		
Yeongju	Punggi-eup; Buseok-myeon; Munsu-myeon; Pyeongeun-myeon; Isan-myeon; Bongheon-myeon; Sunheung-myeon; Jangsu-myeon; Anjeong-myeon; Dansan-myeon; Yeongju-1-dong; Yeongju-2-dong; Gaheung-1-dong; Gaheung-2-dong; Hyucheon-1-dong; Hyucheon-2-dong; Hyucheon-3-dong; Sangmang-dong; Hamang-dong		
Bonghwa County	Bonghwa-eup; Beopjeon-myeon; Bongseong-myeon; Chunyang-myeon; Jaesan-myeon; Murya-myeon; Myeongho-myeon; Sangun-myeon; Seokpo-myeon; Socheon-myeon		
Cheongdo County	Hwayang-eup; Cheongdo-eup; Gakbuk-myeon; Punggak-myeon; Iseo-myeon; Gangnam-myeon; Maejeon-myeon; Geumcheon-myeon; Unmun-myeon		
Cheongsong County	Cheongsong-eup; Juwangsan-myeon; Bunam-myeon; Hyeondong-myeon; Hyeongseo-myeon; Andeok-myeon; Pacheon-myeon; Jinbo-myeon		
Chilgok County	Waegwan-eup; Buksam-eup; Seokjeok-eup; Jicheon-myeon; Dongmyeong-myeon; Gasan-myeon; Yakmok-myeon; Gisan-myeon		
Goryeong County	Daegaya-eup; Deokgok-myeon; Unsu-myeon; Seongsan-myeon; Dasan-myeon; Gaejin-myeon; Ugok-myeon; Ssangnim-myeon		
Gunwi County	Gunwi-eup; Sobo-myeon; Hyoryeong-myeon; Bugye-myeon; Ubo-myeon; Uiheung-myeon; Sanseong-myeon; Samgugyusa-myeon		
Seongju County	Seongju-eup; Seonnam-myeon; Yongam-myeon; Suryun-myeon; Gacheon-myeon; Geumsu-myeon; Daega-myeon; Byeokjin-myeon; Chojeon-myeon; Wolhang-myeon		
Uiseong County	Uiseong-eup; Danchon-myeon; Jeomgok-myeon; Oksan-myeon; Sagok-myeon; Chunsan-myeon; Gaeum-myeon; Geumseong-myeon; Bongyang-myeon; Bian-myeon; Gucheon-myeon; Danmil-myeon; Danbuk-myeon; Angye-myeon; Dain-myeon; Sinpyeong-myeon; Anpyeong-myeon; Ansa-myeon		
Uljin County	Uljin-eup; Pyeonghae-eup; Buk-myeon; Geumgangsong-myeon; Geunnam-myeon; Maehwa-myeon; Giseong-myeon; Onjeong-myeon; Jukbyeon-myeon; Hupo-myeon		
Ulleung County	Ulleung-eup; Buk-myeon; Seo-myeon		
Yecheon County	Yecheon-eup; Yongmun-myeon; Hyoja-myeon; Eunpung-myeon; Gamcheon-myeon; Bomun-myeon; Homyeong-myeon; Yucheon-myeon; Yonggung-myeon; Gaepo-myeon; Jibo-myeon; Pungyang-myeon		
Yeongdeok County	Yeongdeok-eup; Changsu-myeon; Byeonggok-myeon; Yeonghae-myeon; Chuksan-myeon; Jipum-myeon; Ganggu-myeon; Dalsan-myeon; Namjeong-myeon		
Yeongyang County	Yeongyang-eup; Ibam-myeon; Cheonggi-myeon; Irwol-myeon; Subi-myeon; Seokbo-myeon		

== See also ==
- List of cities in South Korea
