= Tapjeong-dong =

- Country: South Korea
- Region: Gyeongju

Government
  - Type: Gyeongju City

Area
  - Total: 19.68 km^{2} (7.60 sq mi)

Population (2008)
  - Total: 5,630
  - Density: 286/km^{2} (741/sq mi)
- Dialect: Gyeongsang dialect

Korean name
- Hangul: 탑정동
- Hanja: 塔正洞
- RR: Tapjeong-dong
- MR: T'apchŏng-dong

Tapjeong-dong (Korean: 탑정동) was an administrative dong or a neighbourhood in the administrative subdivisions of the Gyeongju City, North Gyeongsang province, South Korea until January 2009. It consisted of four legal dong including Tap-dong, Sajeong-dong, Yul-dong, and Bae-dong.

It was bordered by Jungang-dong and Hwangnam-dong on the east, Seondo-dong and Geoncheon-eup on the west, Naenam-myeon on the south and Seonggeon-dong on the north. Its 19.68 square kilometers were home to about 5,630 people. The Poseokjeong and Hongnyunsa temple sites were situated in the district.

== See also ==
- Subdivisions of Gyeongju
- Administrative divisions of South Korea
