= Seondo-dong =

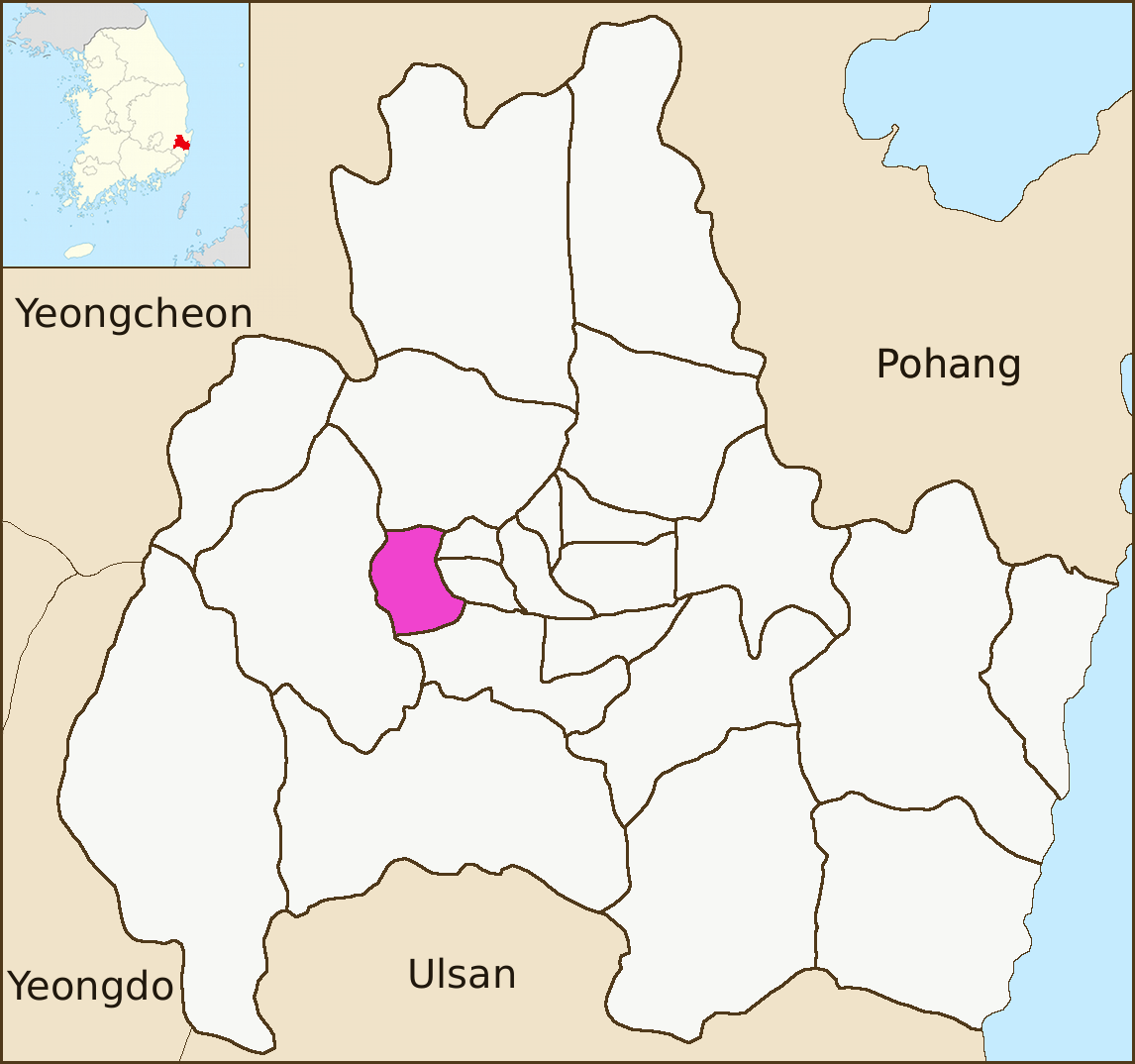
- Country: South Korea
- Region: Gyeongju

Government
  - Type: Gyeongju City

Area
  - Total: 28.00 km^{2} (10.81 sq mi)

Population (2008)
  - Total: 13,587
  - Density: 485.3/km^{2} (1,257/sq mi)
- Dialect: Gyeongsang dialect

Korean name
- Hangul: 선도동
- Hanja: 仙桃洞
- RR: Seondo-dong
- MR: Sŏndo-dong

Seondo-dong (Korean: 선도동) is an administrative dong or neighbourhood in the administrative subdivisions of the Gyeongju City, North Gyeongsang province, South Korea. It consists of four legal dongs such as Seoak-dong, Chunghyo-dong, Hyohyeon-dong, and Gwangmyeong-dong. It is bordered by Seonggeon-dong and Tapjeong-dong on the east, Geoncheon-eup on the south and west and Hyeongok-myeon on the north. Its 28.00 square kilometers are home to about 13,587 people. This population is served by an elementary school, a middle school and a joint middle-high school, two high schools, a junior college, a university and a vocational school.

== See also ==
- Subdivisions of Gyeongju
- Administrative divisions of South Korea
