= Wolseong-dong, Gyeongju =

Coordinates: 35°04′N 126°49′E

Wolseong-dong
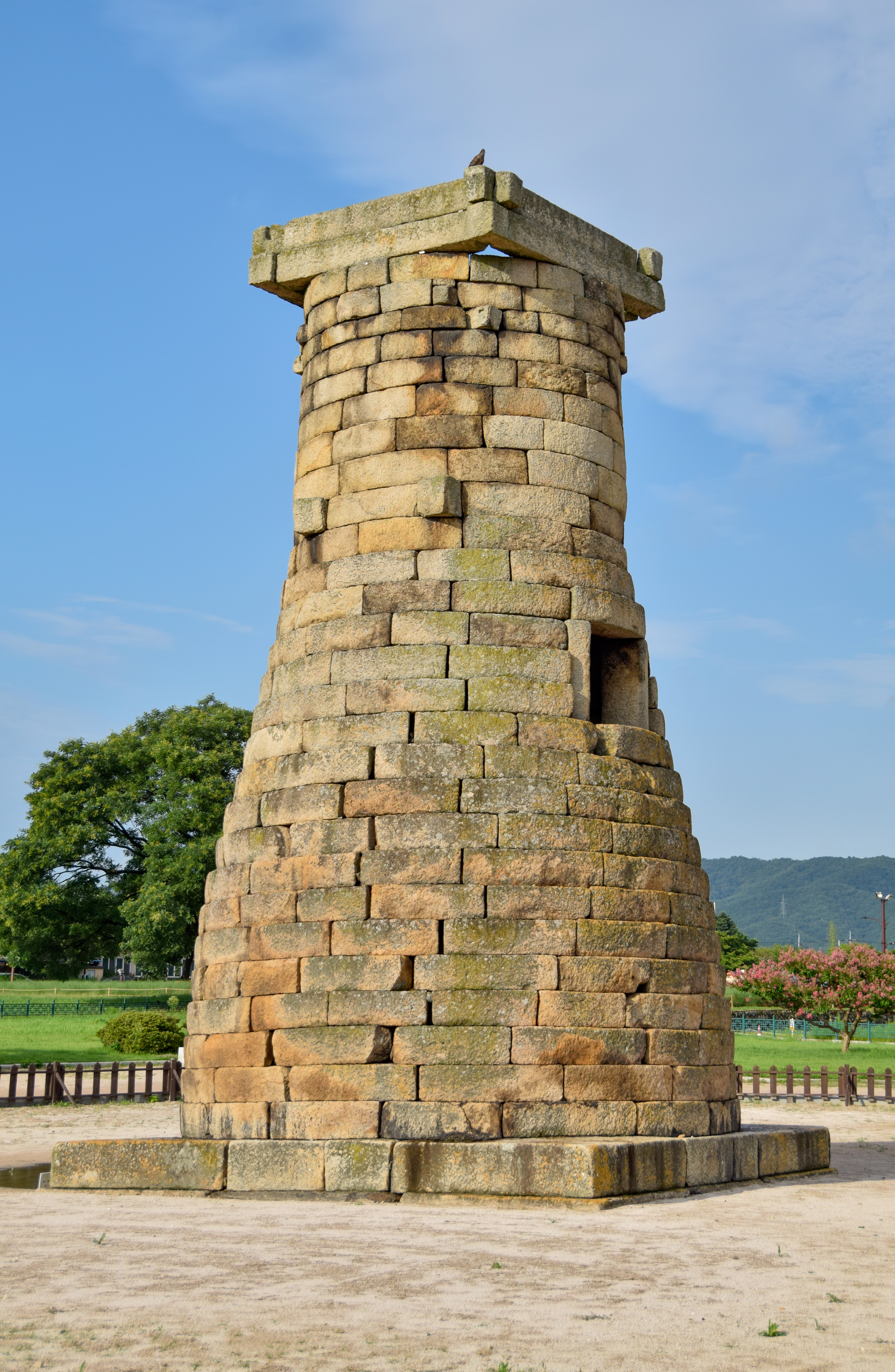
- Cheomseongdae located in Wolseong-dong, Gyeongju

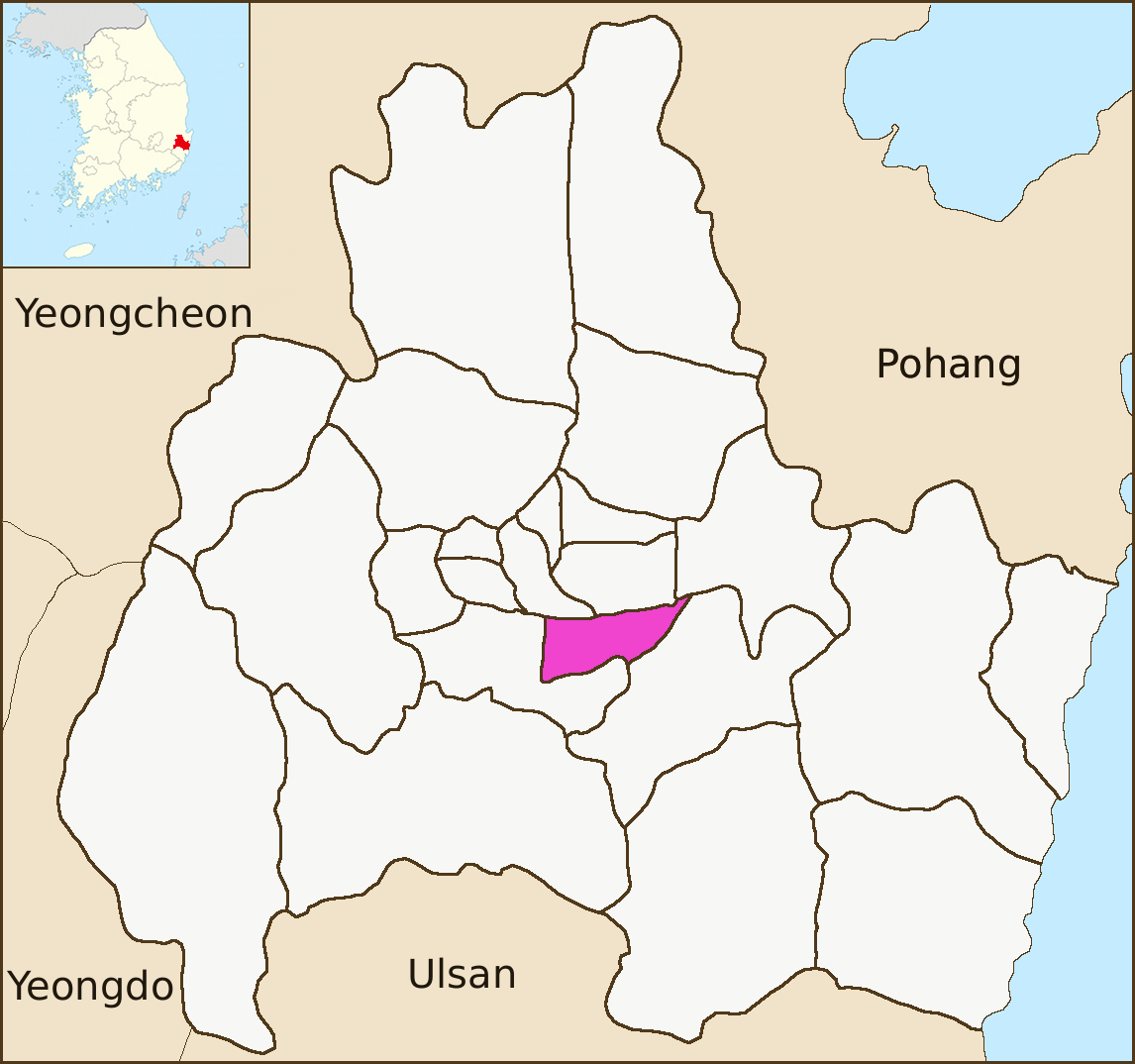
- Country: South Korea
- Region: Gyeongju

Government
  - Type: Gyeongju City

Area
  - Total: 31.43 km^{2} (12.14 sq mi)

Population (2008)
  - Total: 6,269
  - Density: 199.5/km^{2} (516.6/sq mi)
- Dialect: Gyeongsang dialect

Korean name
- Hangul: 월성동
- Hanja: 月城洞
- RR: Wolseong-dong
- MR: Wŏlsŏng-dong

Wolseong-dong (Korean: 월성동) is an administrative dong or a neighbourhood in the administrative subdivisions of the Gyeongju City, North Gyeongsang province, South Korea. It consists of nine legal dong including Inwang-dong, Gyo-dong, Dongbang-dong, Doji-dong, Namsan-dong, Pyeong-dong, Guhwang-dong, Bomun-dong and Baeban-dong

It is bordered by Jeongnae-dong and Bodeok-dong on the east, Hwango-dong and Hwangnam-eup on the west, Naenam-myeon on the south and Dongcheon-dong on the north. Its 31.43 square kilometers are home to about 6,269 people. The Gyeongju National Museum, Cheomseongdae, Hwangnyongsa temple site, Gyerim forest, Banwolseong and many cultural and historical sites are situated in the district.

The population is served by two elementary schools and a joint middle-high school.

== See also ==
- Subdivisions of Gyeongju
- Administrative divisions of South Korea
