= Cheonbuk-myeon =

Cheonbuk-myeon in South Korea may refer to:

- Cheonbuk-myeon, Gyeongju in Gyeongsangbuk-do
- Cheonbuk-myeon, Boryeong in Chungcheongnam-do
