= Bulguk =

Bulguk may refer to:

- Bulguk-dong (Bulguk district in Korea)
- Bulguksa (Bulguk temple in Korea)
