= Seonggeon-dong =

Neighborhood in Gyeongju, South Korea

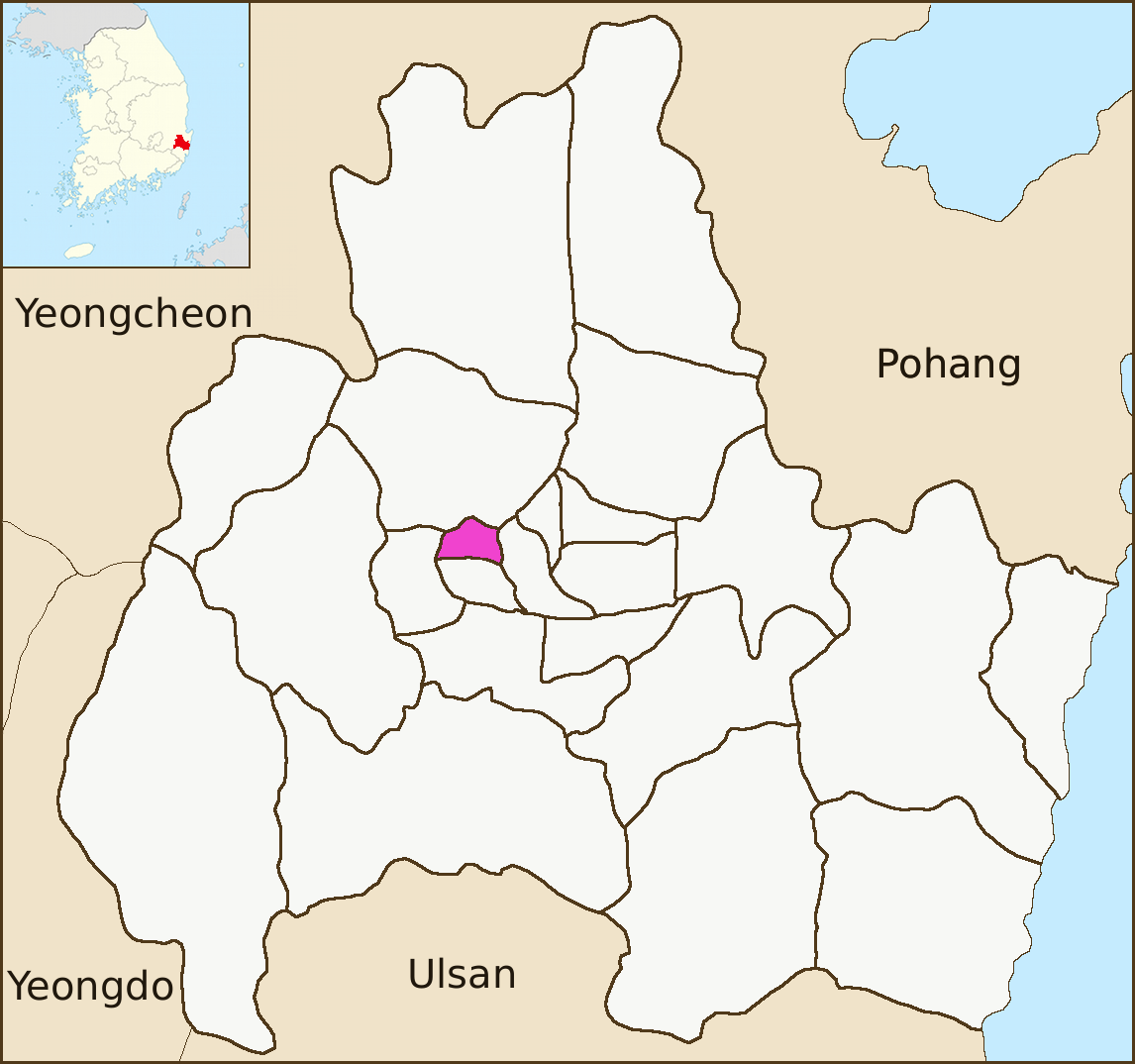
- Country: South Korea
- Region: Gyeongju

Government
  - Type: Gyeongju City

Area
  - Total: 6.42 km^{2} (2.48 sq mi)

Population (2008)
  - Total: 18,219
  - Density: 2,840/km^{2} (7,350/sq mi)
- Dialect: Gyeongsang dialect

Korean name
- Hangul: 성건동
- Hanja: 城乾洞
- RR: Seonggeon-dong
- MR: Sŏnggŏn-dong

Seonggeon-dong (Korean: 성건동) is an administrative dong or a neighbourhood in the administrative subdivisions of the Gyeongju City, North Gyeongsang province, South Korea. It consists of four legal dongs including Seonggeon-dong and Seokjang-dong. It is bordered by Dongcheon-dong on the east, Geoncheon-eup on the west and Jungbu-dong on the south and Hyeongok-myeon on the north. Its 6.42 square kilometers are home to about 18,219 people. The Gyeongju branch campus of Dongguk University is situated in the district and it has an elementary school and a high school

== Origin of the name ==
The name Seonggeon is derived from the term geonbang (乾方), which refers to the northwest direction in traditional East Asian geomancy. The name reflects the area's location to the northwest of the fortress (seong) that once stood in the region.

Historically, the area outside the west gate (Mangmimun) of Gyeongju Eupseong Fortress was referred to as West Seonggeon, while the area outside the north gate (Gongjinmun) was known as North Seonggeon. The broader area of present-day Seonggeon-dong encompasses the region extending west of these gates, including the area along the Hyeongsan River to the west and the Bukcheon stream, which flows into the Hyeongsan River from the north.

== See also ==
- Subdivisions of Gyeongju
- Administrative divisions of South Korea
