= Yonggang-dong, Gyeongju =

Yonggang-dong
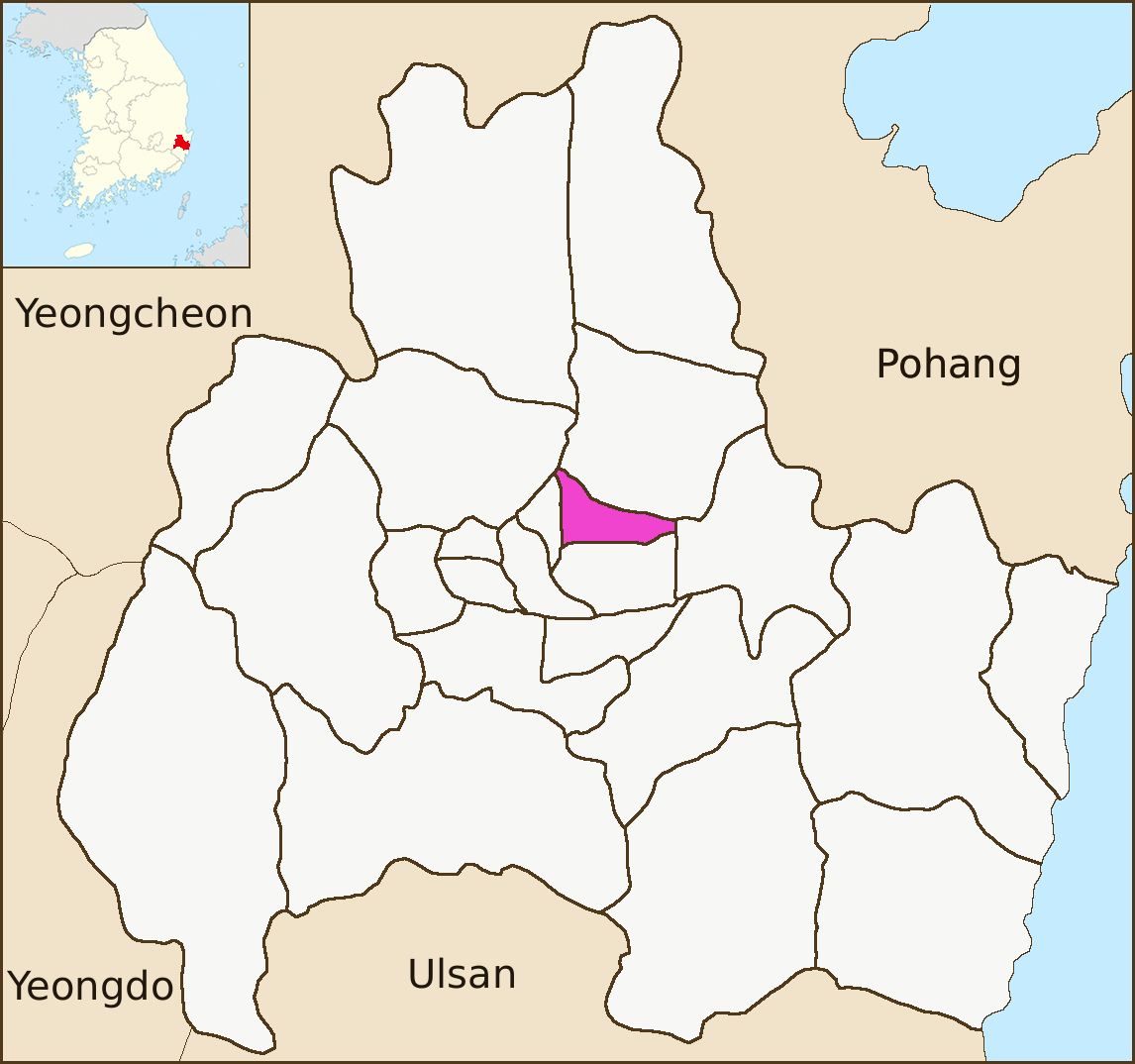
- Country: South Korea
- Region: Gyeongju

Government
  - Type: Gyeongju City

Area
  - Total: 5.06 km^{2} (1.95 sq mi)

Population (2008)
  - Total: 15,817
  - Density: 3,130/km^{2} (8,100/sq mi)
- Dialect: Gyeongsang dialect

Korean name
- Hangul: 용강동
- Hanja: 龍江洞
- RR: Yonggang-dong
- MR: Yonggang-dong

Yonggang-dong (Korean: 용강동) is both an administrative and legal dong or a neighbourhood in the administrative subdivisions of the Gyeongju City, North Gyeongsang province, South Korea. It is bordered by Bukgun-dong on the east, Deoksan-ri of Cheonbuk-myeon on the northeast, Hwangseong-dong and Dongcheon-dong on the south and Geumjang-ri of Hyeongok-myeon on the south. Its 5.06 square kilometers are home to about 15,817 people. It has two elementary schools, a middle school and a high school

== See also ==
- Subdivisions of Gyeongju
- Administrative divisions of South Korea
