= Seo-myeon, Gyeongju =

Seo-myeon
- myeon
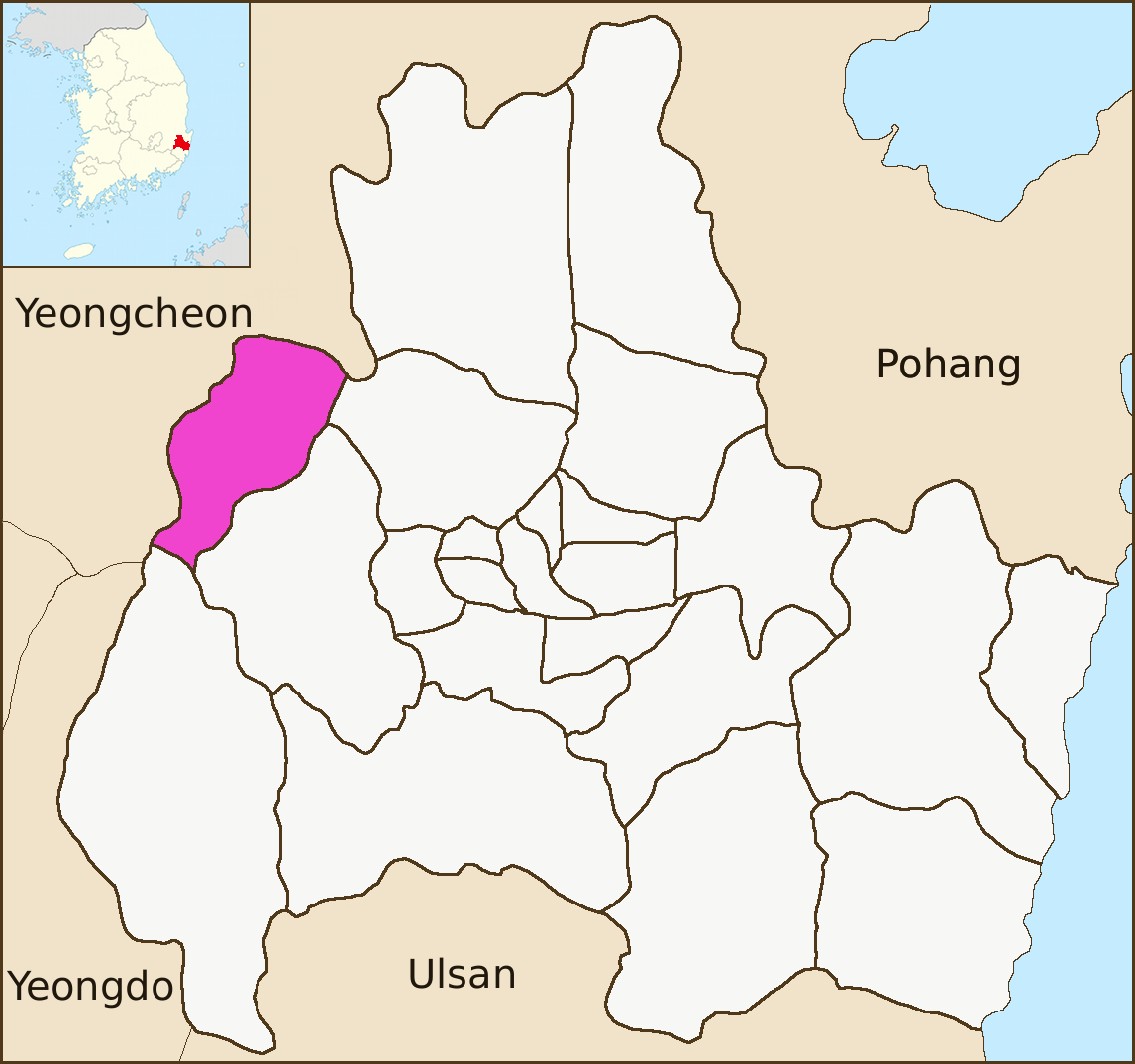

- Location within South Korea
- Coordinates: 35.885573°N 129.064465°E
- Country: South Korea
- Region: Gyeongju
- Administrative divisions: 13 administrative ri (8 legal ri), 61 ban

Government
  - Type: Gyeongju City

Area
  - Total: 52.12 km^{2} (20.12 sq mi)

Population (2006)
  - Total: 4,166
  - Density: 80/km^{2} (210/sq mi)
- Dialect: Gyeongsang dialect

Korean name
- Hangul: 서면
- Hanja: 西面
- RR: Seo-myeon
- MR: Sŏ-myŏn

Seo-myeon (Korean: 서면) is a myeon or a township in the subdivision of the Gyeongju City, North Gyeongsang province, South Korea. It is bordered by its neighborhoods including Hyeongok-myeon and Geoncheon-eup on the east, Sannae-myeon on the south and Yeongcheon City on the west and north. Its 52.12 square kilometers are home to about 4,166 people. This population is served by one elementary school and one joint middle school.

== Administrative divisions ==
- Dogye-ri (도계리)
- Do-ri (도리)
- Sara-ri (사라리)
- Seoo-ri (서오리)
- Simgok-ri (심곡리)
- Undae-ri (운대리)
- Ihwa-ri (이화리)
- Cheonchon-ri (천촌리)

== See also ==
- Subdivisions of Gyeongju
- Administrative divisions of South Korea
