= Munmudaewang-myeon =

- myeon
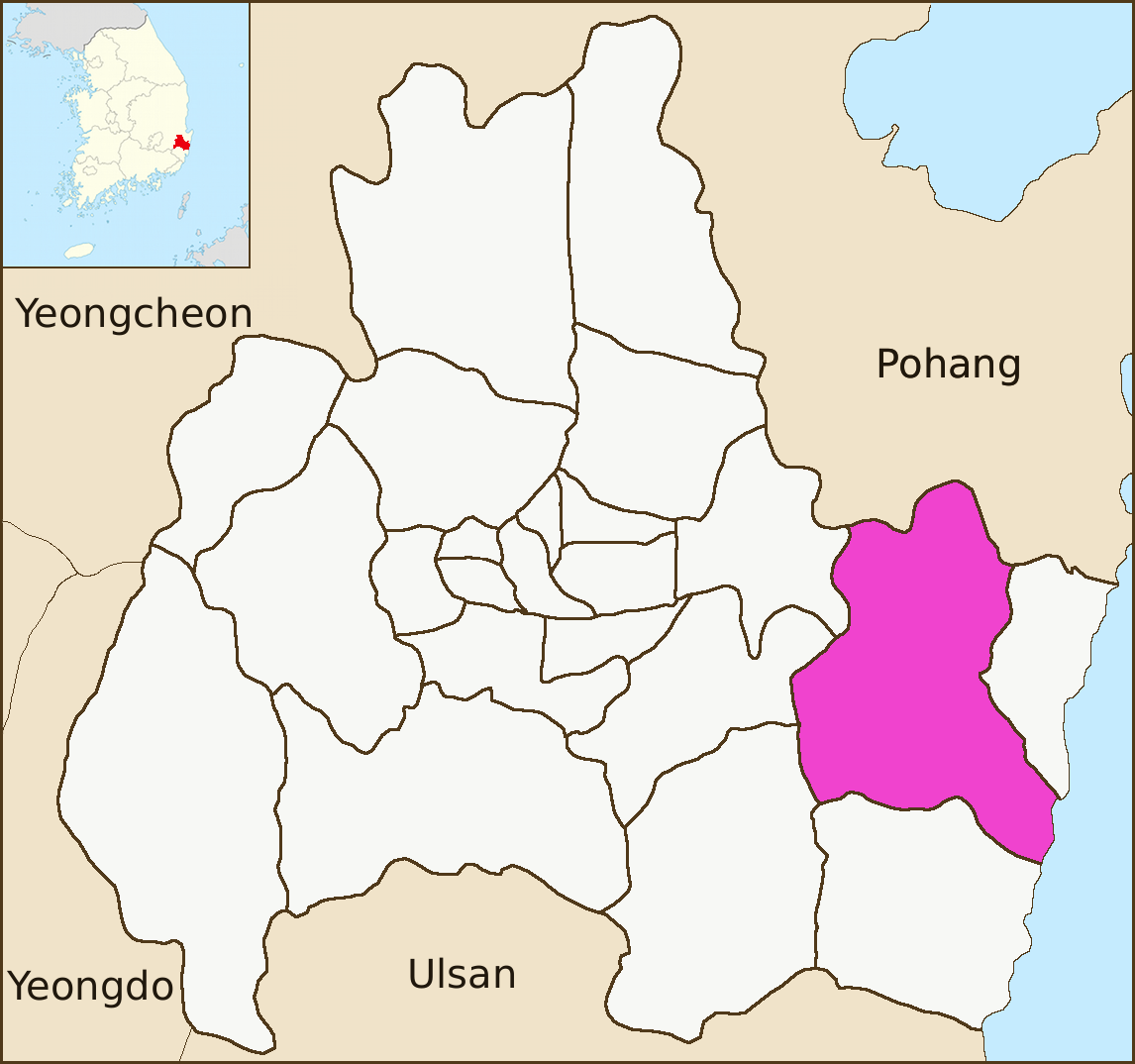
- Country: South Korea
- Region: Gyeongju
- Administrative divisions: 21 administrative ri (15 legal ri), 90 ban

Government
  - Type: Gyeongju

Area
  - Total: 120.06 km^{2} (46.36 sq mi)

Population (2006)
  - Total: 4,558
  - Density: 38/km^{2} (98/sq mi)
- Dialect: Gyeongsang dialect

Korean name
- Hangul: 문무대왕면
- Hanja: 文武大王面
- RR: Munmudaewang-myeon
- MR: Munmudaewang-myŏn

Munmudaewang-myeon (Korean: 문무대왕면) is a myeon or a township in the administrative subdivisions of Gyeongju, North Gyeongsang Province, South Korea. It is bordered by Gampo-eup and Sea of Japan (East Sea) on the east, Yangnam-myeon on the south, Bulguk-dong, Bodeok-dong and Oedong-eup on the west and Ocheon-eup and Janggi-myeon of the Pohang on the north. Its 120.06 square kilometers are home to about 4,558 people. This population is served by one joint elementary-middle school.

== Administrative divisions ==
- Gugil-ri (구길리)
- Gwoni-ri (권이리)
- Dusan-ri (두산리)
- Beopgok-ri (범곡리)
- Bonggil-ri (봉길리)
- Songjeon-ri (송전리)
- Andong-ri (안동리)
- Eoil-ri (어일리)
- Waeup-ri (와읍리)
- Yongdang-ri (용당리)
- Yongdong-ri (용동리)
- Ipcheon-ri (입천리)
- Janghang-ri (장항리)
- Jukjeon-ri (죽전리)
- Hoam-ri (호암리)

== See also ==
- Administrative divisions of South Korea
- Subdivisions of Gyeongju
