= Subdivisions of Gyeongju =

The primary subdivisions of Gyeongju in South Korea consist of 4 eup, 8 myeon, and 11 dong. These units are the same into which all of the cities and counties of South Korea are divided. The dong units occupy the area of the city center, which was formerly occupied by Gyeongju-eup. Eup refers to a substantial village, whereas the myeon are more rural. The current divisions are as follows, using the numbers given on the map:

== Subdivisions ==
| Map | # | Place | Population (2007) | House hold | Area (km^{2}) | # | Place | Population | House hold | Area (km^{2}) |
|---|---|---|---|---|---|---|---|---|---|---|
Map of the administrative divisions of Gyeongju.
| Map of the administrative divisions of Gyeongju. | 1 | Sannae-myeon | 3,561 | 1,779 | 142.6 | 13 | Seondo-dong | 13,813 | 2,831 | 28.0 |
| Map of the administrative divisions of Gyeongju. | 2 | Seo-myeon | 4,773 | 1,779 | 52.1 | 14 | Seonggeon-dong | 18,378 | 7,562 | 6.4 |
| Map of the administrative divisions of Gyeongju. | 3 | Hyeongok-myeon | 16,829 | 5,726 | 55.7 | 15 | Hwangseong-dong | 29,660 | 9,415 | 3.8 |
| Map of the administrative divisions of Gyeongju. | 4 | Angang-eup | 33,802 | 12,641 | 138.6 | 16 | Yonggang-dong | 15,959 | 5,244 | 5.1 |
| Map of the administrative divisions of Gyeongju. | 5 | Gangdong-myeon | 8,834 | 3,659 | 81.4 | 17 | Bodeok-dong | 2,296 | 977 | 81.0 |
| Map of the administrative divisions of Gyeongju. | 6 | Cheonbuk-myeon | 6,185 | 2,328 | 58.2 | 18 | Bulguk-dong | 9,001 | 3,722 | 37.4 |
| Map of the administrative divisions of Gyeongju. | 7 | Yangbuk-myeon | 4,535 | 2,026 | 120.1 | 19 | Hwangnam-dong | 8,885 | 3,875 | 20.5 |
| Map of the administrative divisions of Gyeongju. | 8 | Gampo-eup | 7,099 | 3,084 | 44.9 | 20 | Jungbu-dong | 7,003 | 3,022 | 0.9 |
| Map of the administrative divisions of Gyeongju. | 9 | Yangnam-myeon | 7,131 | 2,941 | 85.1 | 21 | Hwango-dong | 10,225 | 4283 | 1.5 |
| Map of the administrative divisions of Gyeongju. | 10 | Oedong-eup | 19,006 | 6,965 | 109.8 | 22 | Dongcheon-dong | 26,721 | 9,228 | 5.3 |
| Map of the administrative divisions of Gyeongju. | 11 | Naenam-myeon | 6,142 | 2,526 | 122.1 | 23 | Wolseong-dong | 6,522 | 4,842 | 31.4 |
| Map of the administrative divisions of Gyeongju. | 12 | Geoncheon-eup | 11,217 | 4,533 | 92.4 | | | | | |

== Eup ==
Angang-eup (No.4) is the second-largest subdivision of Gyeongju City. Its 139 square kilometers are home to about 35,700 people. Situated next to Gangdong-myeon in the city's northern tip, it is a significant town in its own right. Angang Station is a regular stop on the Donghae Nambu Line. The town center lies on the Hyeongsan River, near where it meets the small Chilpyeongcheon stream.

Gampo-eup (No.8) also contains a piece of Gyeongju National Park: the Daebon section which covers the shoreline near the watery grave of King Munmu. 7,900 people live in Gampo-eup, served by three elementary schools and a joint middle-high school. Important local products include persimmons as well as anchovies, seaweed, and squid.

Oedong-eup (No.10) is linked by road and rail to the neighboring metropolis of Ulsan. Thanks to this, it has been a center of the development of Gyeongju's automotive parts industry. Three industrial complexes are located here. Roughly 18,300 people live in Oedong-eup. This population is served by six elementary schools, a middle school, and a high school.

Geoncheon-eup (No.12)

== Myeon ==
Sannae-myeon (No.1) - its name means "within the mountains." Sannae-myeon covers 142.25 km^{2} and is home to 3,695 people. It has an elementary school and a joint middle-high school.

Seo-myeon (No.2) - its name means "Western myeon." An elementary school and middle school are located in Seo-myeon, serving a local population of 4,400.

Hyeongok-myeon (No.3) played a significant role in the history of Chondogyo, a Korean religion. Choe Je-u, the founder of Chondogyo, used Gumi Mountain as the base for his missionary activities in the early 1860s. The Gumi Mountain area is now part of Gyeongju National Park. Two elementary schools and a high school are located in Hyeongok-myeon, serving a population of 11,500.

Gangdong-myeon (No.5) its name means "east of the river," although in fact much of it lies north of the Hyeongsan River. It is home to 9,000 people. Two elementary schools are located here, as is Uiduk University. The Yangdong Folk Village, a tourist attraction preserving the culture of the late Joseon dynasty, also lies within Gangdong-myeon.

Cheonbuk-myeon (No.6) is home to about 6,100 people. It is home to two elementary schools, as well as Silla Industrial High School. The area is strongly agricultural. In addition to grain crops, apples are widely cultivated.

Yangbuk-myeon (No.7) stretches from central Gyeongju to the coast of the Sea of Japan (East Sea). Despite its large area, it is home to only 4,500 people. This is in part because much of it is taken up by the Toham-san section of Gyeongju National Park. Yangbuk-myeon is home to two elementary schools, a high school, and a joint elementary-middle school.

Yangnam-myeon (No.9) is the southernmost of the three coastal subdivisions of Gyeongju. The Wolseong Nuclear Power Plant is located on the coast. It provides about 5% of South Korea's electricity. About 6,800 people live in this district.

Naenam-myeon (No.11)

== Dong ==
Bodeok-dong (No.17)

Bulguk-dong (No.18)

Dongcheon-dong (No.22) is the site of Gyeongju City Hall.

Hwangnam-dong (No.24) is known across South Korea as the birthplace of Gyeongju bread-dong, a popular bean-paste pastry also often called "Hwangnam bread."

Hwango-dong (No.21)

Hwangseong-dong (No.15)

Jungbu-dong (No.20)

Seondo-dong (No.13)

Seongdong-dong (No.25)

Seonggeon-dong (No.14)

Tapjeong-dong (No.19)

Wolseong-dong (No.23)

Yonggang-dong (No.16)

== See also ==
- Subdivisions of South Korea

== Notes ==
1. As of April 2004. "일반현황". Angang-eup (Gyeongju City website).
2. As of April 2004. "일반현황". Gangdong-myeon (Gyeongju City website).
3. "교육기관". Gangdong-myeon (Gyeongju City website).
4. "기본현황". Cheonbuk-myeon (Gyeongju City website).
5. "교육기관". Cheonbuk-myeon (Gyeongju City website).
6. "기본현황". Yangbuk-myeon (Gyeongju City website).
7. "교육기관". Yangbuk-myeon (Gyeongju City website).
8. "Gampo -eup website". Gyeongju city website.
9. Official site.
10. "KHNP Fact Sheet". CANDU Owners Group website. Archived from the original on May 15, 2009.
11. "기본현황". Yangnam-myeon (Gyeongju City website).
12. "6. Industrial and Agricultural Complex". Statistical yearbook of Gyeongju 2004. Archived from the original on September 22, 2008.
13. "기본현황". Oedong-eup (Gyeongju City website).
14. "교육기관". Oedong-eup (Gyeongju City website).
