= Yangnam-myeon =

- myeon
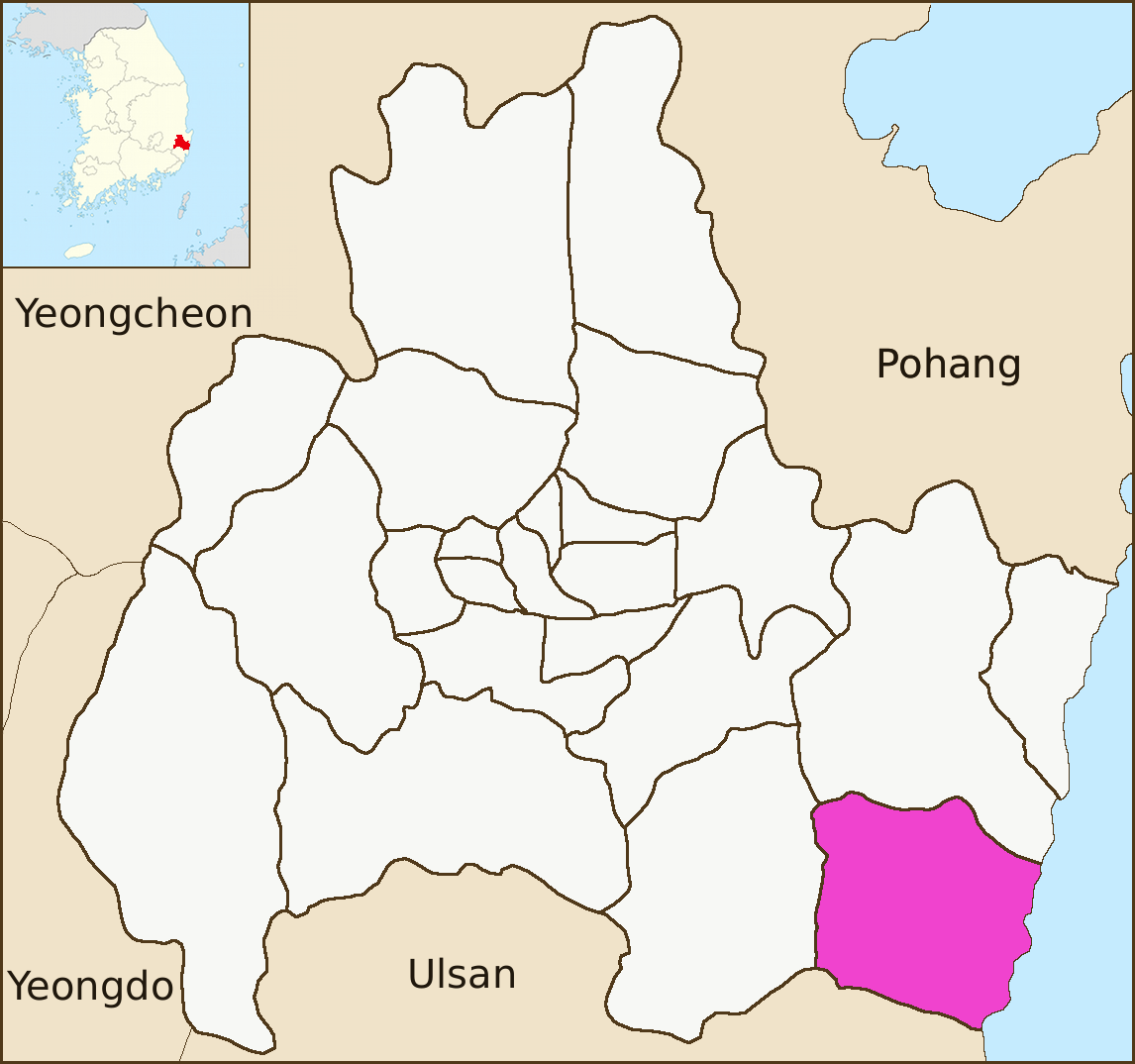

- Location within South Korea
- Coordinates: 35°40′40″N 129°27′43″E
- Country: South Korea
- Region: Gyeongju
- Administrative divisions: 22 administrative ri (15 legal ri), 76 ban

Government
  - Type: Gyeongju City

Area
  - Total: 85.06 km^{2} (32.84 sq mi)

Population (2006)
  - Total: 7,131
  - Density: 84/km^{2} (220/sq mi)
- Dialect: Gyeongsang dialect

Korean name
- Hangul: 양남면
- Hanja: 陽南面
- RR: Yangnam-myeon
- MR: Yangnam-myŏn

Yangnam-myeon (Korean: 양남면) is a myeon or a township in the administrative subdivisions of the Gyeongju City, North Gyeongsang province, South Korea. It is bordered by the Sea of Japan (East Sea) on the east, the Ulju County of Ulsan Metropolitan City on the south, Oedong-eup on the west and Yangbuk-myeon on the north. Its 85.06 square kilometers are home to about 7,131 people. The Wolseong Nuclear Power Plant is situated in the myeon.

== Administrative divisions ==
- Gigu-ri (기구리)
- Nasan-ri (나산리)
- Naa-ri (나아리)
- Sanggye-ri (상계리)
- Sangna-ri (상라리)
- Seodong-ri (서동리)
- Seogeup-ri (석읍리)
- Seokchon-ri (석촌리)
- Suryeom-ri (수렴리)
- Sindae-ri (신대리)
- Sinseo-ri (신서리)
- Eupcheon-ri (읍천리)
- Haseo-ri (하서리)
- Hwanseo-ri (환서리)
- Hyodong-ri (효동리)

== See also ==
- Subdivisions of Gyeongju
- Administrative divisions of South Korea
