= Jungbu-dong, Gyeongju =

Jungbu-dong

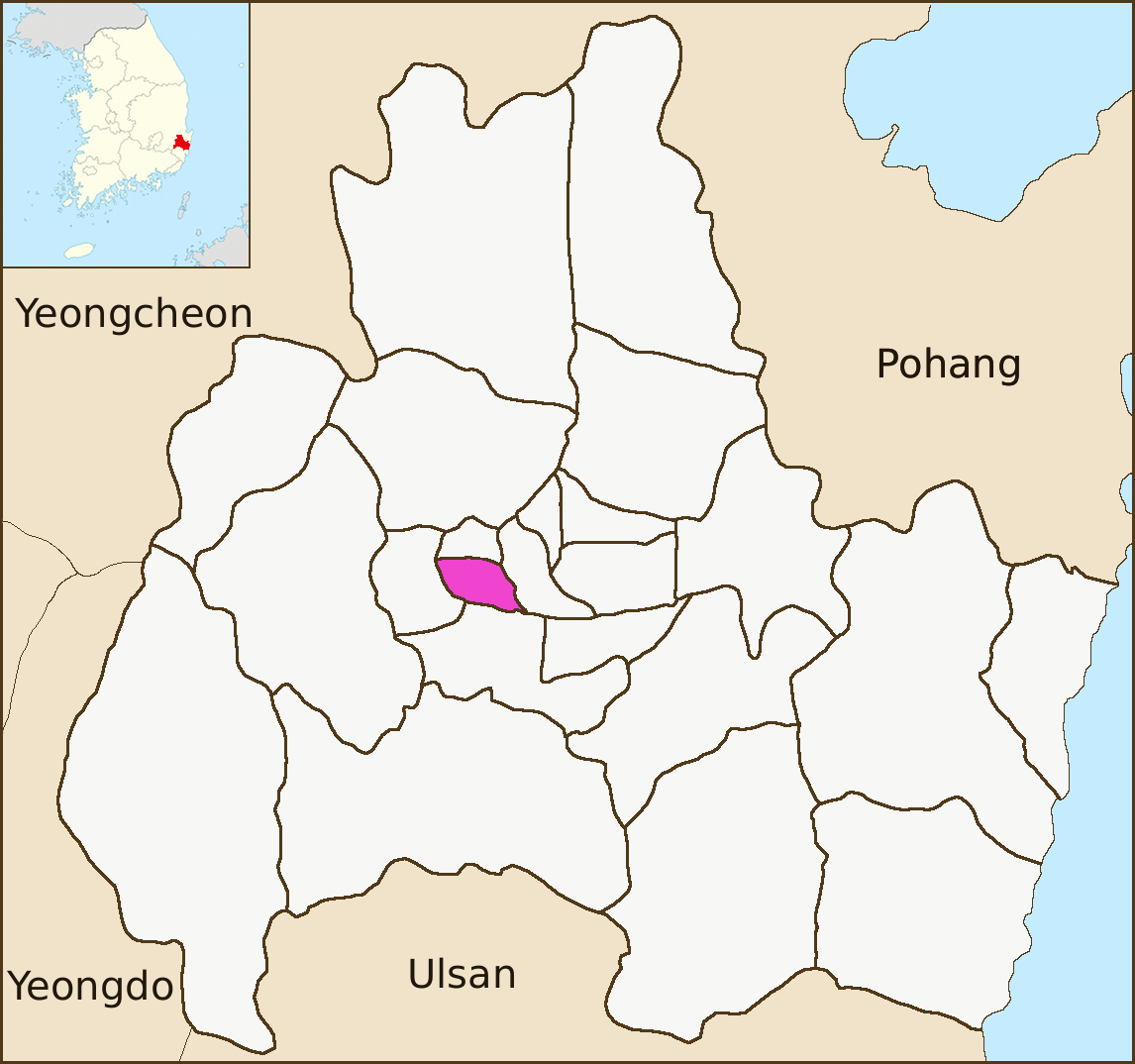
- Country: South Korea
- Region: Gyeongju

Government
  - Type: Gyeongju City

Area
  - Total: 0.93 km^{2} (0.36 sq mi)

Population (2008)
  - Total: 6,894
  - Density: 7,400/km^{2} (19,000/sq mi)
- Dialect: Gyeongsang dialect

Korean name
- Hangul: 중부동
- Hanja: 中部洞
- RR: Jungbu-dong
- MR: Chungbu-dong

Jungbu-dong (Korean: 중부동) is a dong or a neighbourhood of the Gyeongju City, North Gyeongsang province, South Korea. It is bordered by Songdong-dong and Hwango-dong on the east, Seonggeon-dong on the west, Hwangnam-dong on the south and Hwangseong-dong on the north. Its 0.93 square kilometers are home to about 6,894 people. It is an administrative dong that consists of five legal dongs such as Seobu-dong, Dongbu-dong, Bukbu-dong, Noseo-dong, and Nodong-dong.

Jungbu-dong has two elementary schools and one middle school.

== See also ==
- Subdivisions of Gyeongju
- Administrative divisions of South Korea
