= Sannae-myeon, Gyeongju =

Sannae-myeon
- myeon
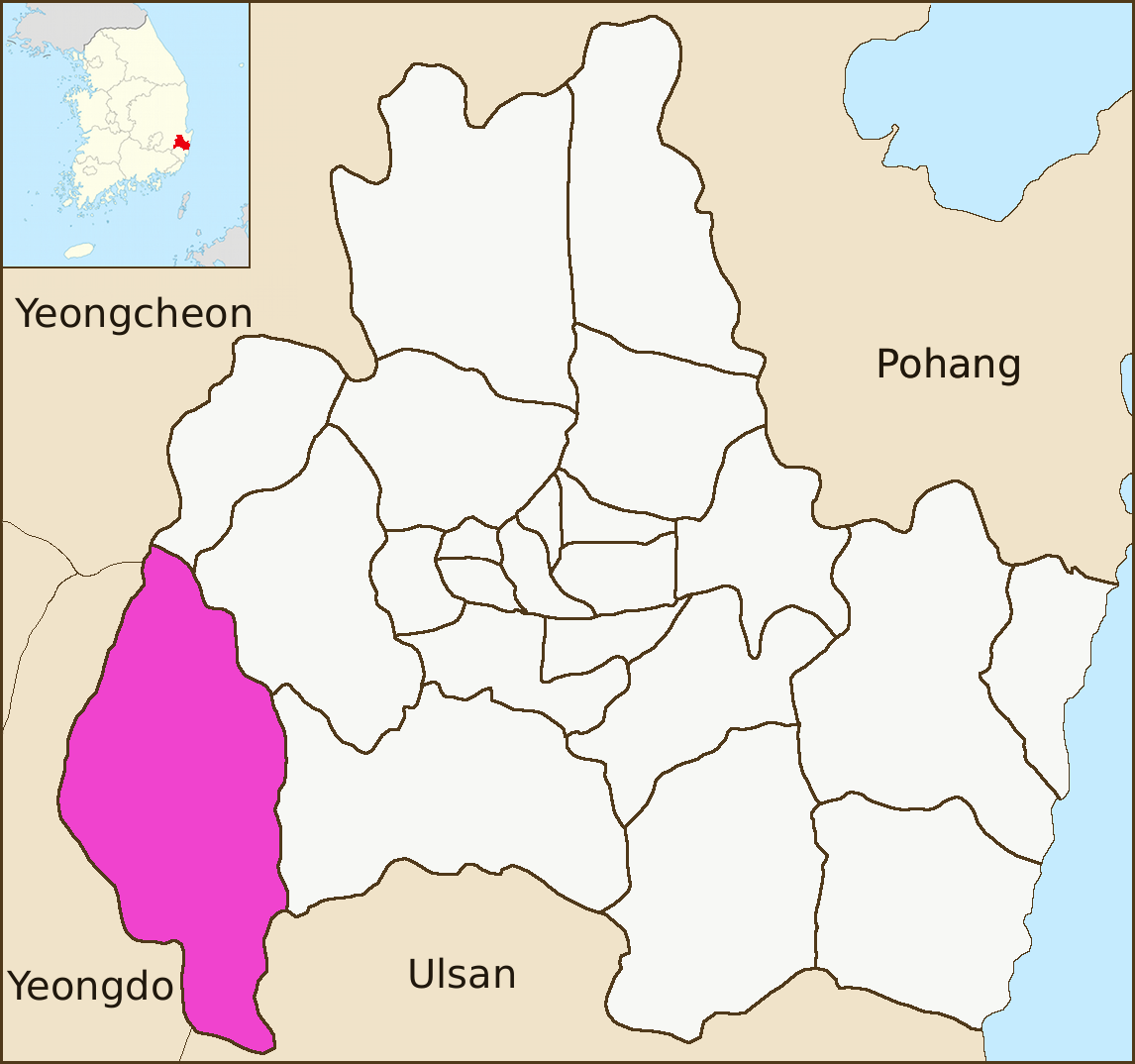

- Location within South Korea
- Country: South Korea
- Region: Gyeongju
- Administrative divisions: 19 administrative ri (9 legal ri), 71 ban

Government
  - Type: Gyeongju City

Area
  - Total: 143.03 km^{2} (55.22 sq mi)

Population (2012)
  - Total: 3,325
  - Density: 23.25/km^{2} (60.21/sq mi)
- Dialect: Gyeongsang dialect

Korean name
- Hangul: 산내면
- Hanja: 山內面
- RR: Sannae-myeon
- MR: Sannae-myŏn

Sannae-myeon (Korean: 산내면) is a myeon or a township in the subdivision of Gyeongju City, North Gyeongsang province, South Korea. As of July 2024, it has a population of 3,203 and covers an area of 142.55 square kilometers.

Located approximately 26 kilometers southwest of central Gyeongju, Sannae-myeon is a mountainous area, with elevations ranging from 200 to 550 meters above sea level. About 83% of the land is classified as forest. It borders Sangbuk-myeon of Ulju-gun, Ulsan to the south, Naenam-myeon of Gyeongju to the southeast, Unmun-myeon of Cheongdo County to the west, and Bukan-myeon of Yeongcheon to the north.

The Dongchangcheon stream flows through the township and eventually feeds into the Unmun Dam, a major water source for Daegu. Due to its mountainous environment, the area supports a variety of freshwater fish species, including lenok, Korean bullhead, minnows, and pond smelt.

== Administrative divisions ==
Sannae-myeon is further divided into the following ri (administrative divisions):

- Daehyeon 1-ri (대현1리)
- Daehyeon 2-ri (대현2리)
- Daehyeon 3-ri (대현3리)
- Gamsan 1-ri (감산1리)
- Gamsan 2-ri (감산2리)
- Ilbu 1-ri (일부1리)
- Ilbu 2-ri (일부2리)
- Naechil 1-ri (내칠1리)
- Naechil 2-ri (내칠2리)
- Nae-il 1-ri (내일1리)
- Nae-il 2-ri (내일2리)
- Oechil 1-ri (외칠1리)
- Oechil 2-ri (외칠2리)
- Sin-won 1-ri (신원1리)
- Sin-won 2-ri (신원2리)
- Uigok 1-ri (의곡1리)
- Uigok 2-ri (의곡2리)
- Ura 1-ri (우라1리)
- Ura 2-ri (우라2리)

== See also ==
- Subdivisions of Gyeongju
- Administrative divisions of South Korea
