= Hyeongok-myeon =

- myeon
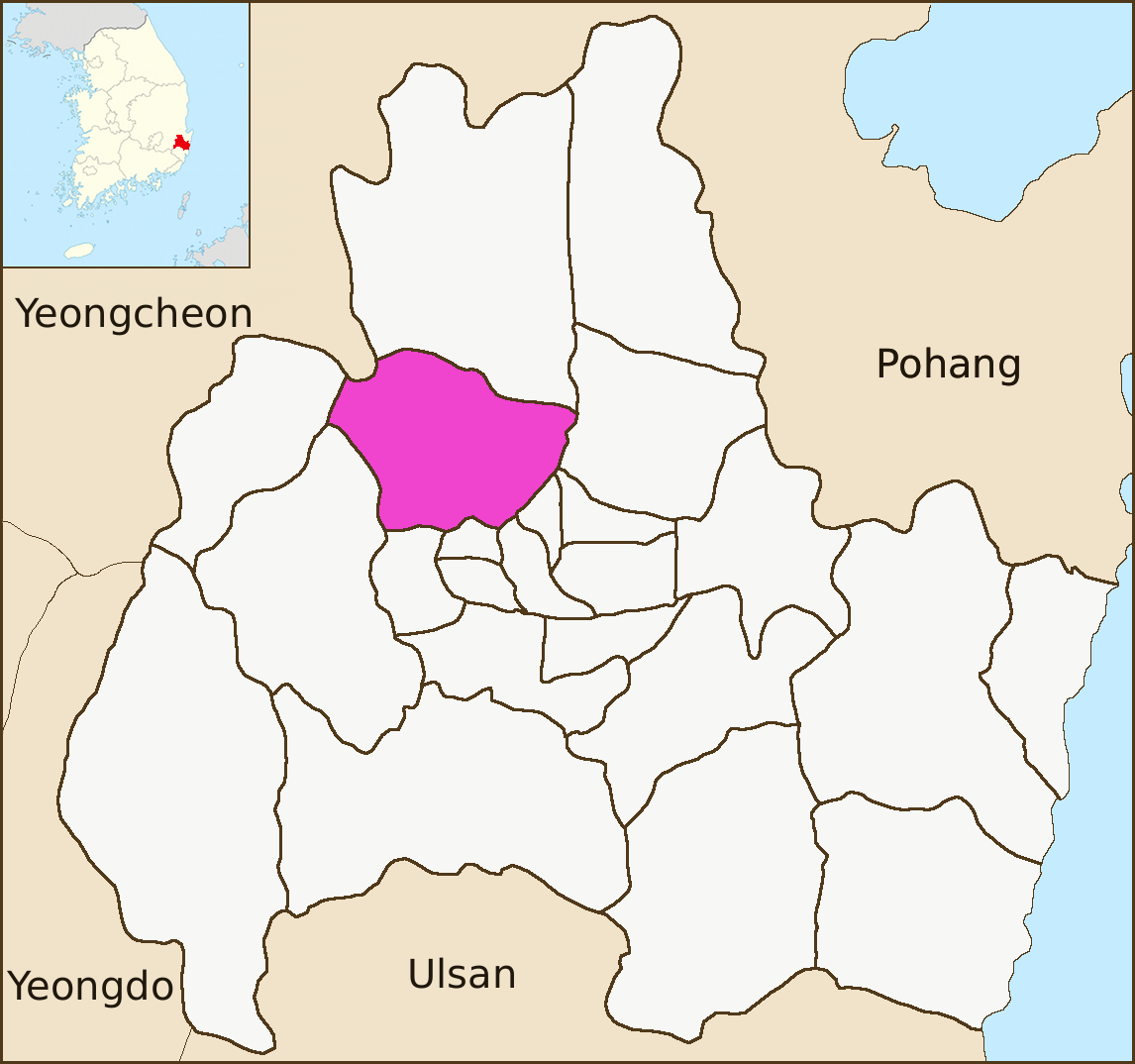

- Location within South Korea
- Coordinates: 35.89373°N 129.1699°E
- Country: South Korea
- Region: Gyeongju
- Administrative divisions: 27 administrative ri (10 legal ri), 129 ban

Government
  - Type: Gyeongju City

Area
  - Total: 55.74 km^{2} (21.52 sq mi)

Population (2006)
  - Total: 13,658
  - Density: 80/km^{2} (210/sq mi)
- Dialect: Gyeongsang dialect

Korean name
- Hangul: 현곡면
- Hanja: 見谷面
- RR: Hyeongok-myeon
- MR: Hyŏn'gok-myŏn

Hyeongok-myeon (Korean: 현곡면) is a myeon or a township in the administrative subdivisions of Gyeongju City, North Gyeongsang province, South Korea. It is bordered by Hyeongsan River, Cheonbuk-myeon and Yonghwang-dong to the east, Bodeok-dong to the south, Geoncheon-eup to the southwest, Seo-myeon to the west and Angang-eup to the north. It has an area of 55.74 square kilometers and is home to 13,658 people. This population is served by three elementary schools, one middle school and one high school.

== Administrative divisions ==
- Gajeong-ri (가정리)
- Geumjang-ri (금장리)
- Namsa-ri (남사리)
- Lawon-ri (라원리)
- Laetae-ri (래태리)
- Mugwan-ri (무관리)
- Sanggu-ri (상구리)
- Sohyeon-ri (소현리)
- Oryu-ri (오류리)
- Hagu-ri (하구리)

== See also ==
- Subdivisions of Gyeongju
- Administrative divisions of South Korea
