= Hwangseong-dong, Gyeongju =

Hwangseong-dong
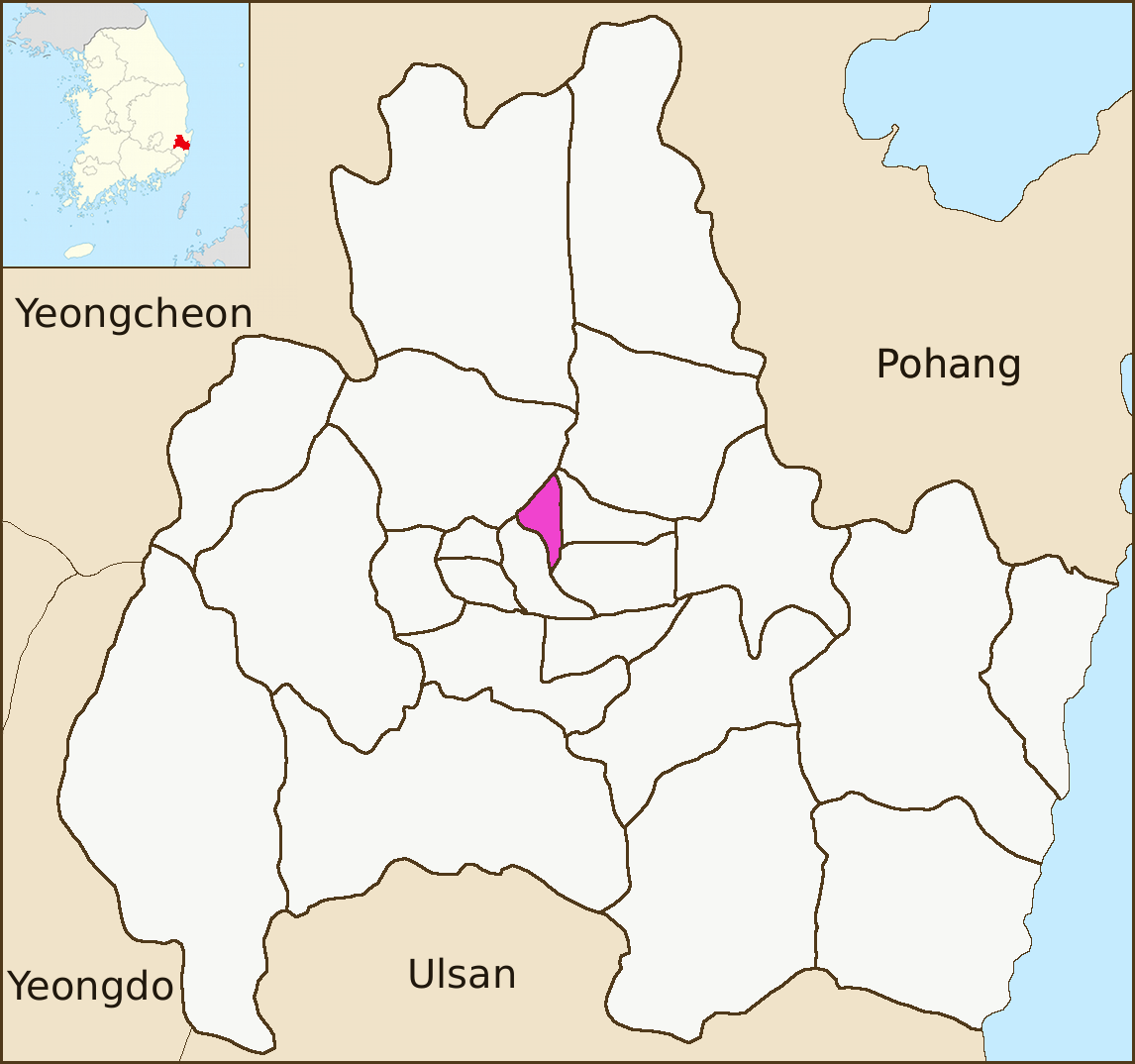
- Coordinates: 35°51′35″N 129°13′06″E
- Country: South Korea
- Region: Gyeongju

Government
  - Type: Gyeongju City

Area
  - Total: 3.84 km^{2} (1.48 sq mi)

Population (2008)
  - Total: 29,140
  - Density: 7,590/km^{2} (19,700/sq mi)
- Dialect: Gyeongsang dialect

Korean name
- Hangul: 황성동
- Hanja: 隍城洞
- RR: Hwangseong-dong
- MR: Hwangsŏng-dong

Hwangseong-dong (Korean: 황성동) is both an administrative and legal dong or a neighbourhood in the administrative subdivisions of the Gyeongju City, North Gyeongsang province, South Korea. It is bordered by Yonggang-dong on the east, Hyeongok-myeon on the west and north and Seongnae-dong on the south. Its 3.84 square kilometers are home to about 29,140 people. It has two elementary schools, three middle schools and one high school

== Origin of the name ==
The name Hwangseong is believed to have originated from the presence of a fortress (seong) that existed in the area during the Silla period. The term Hwangseong (皇城) translates to "Imperial Fortress" or "Royal Castle."

Historically, the area was referred to as Goseong-dong (古城洞), meaning "Old Fortress Neighborhood." According to local elder accounts, the remnants of the former fortress are presumed to have been an earthen structure (toseong). Traces of the fortress are reported to remain faintly visible in the area stretching from behind the traditional archery range within Hwangseong Park, past the Memorial Tower, and toward the public stadium. The terrain features a higher elevation to the south and a lower elevation to the north. Over time, the visible remains of the structure have continued to diminish.

== See also ==
- Subdivisions of Gyeongju
- Administrative divisions of South Korea
