= Hwangnam-dong =

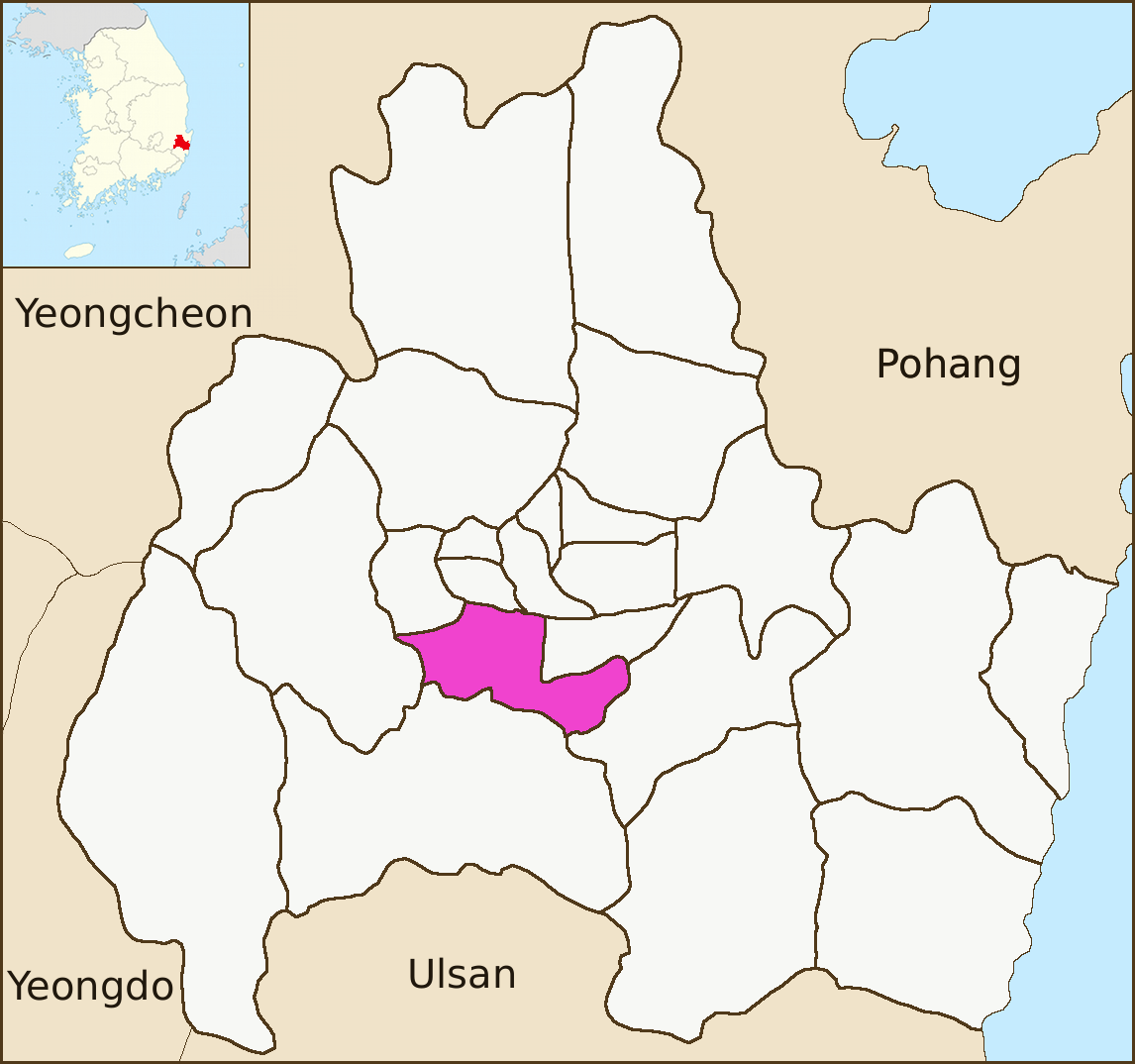
- Country: South Korea
- Region: Gyeongju

Government
  - Type: Gyeongju City

Area
  - Total: 20.5 km^{2} (7.9 sq mi)

Population (2008)
  - Total: 8,885
  - Density: 433/km^{2} (1,120/sq mi)
- Dialect: Gyeongsang dialect

Korean name
- Hangul: 황남동
- Hanja: 皇南洞
- RR: Hwangnam-dong
- MR: Hwangnam-dong

Hwangnam-dong (Korean: 황남동) is a dong or a neighbourhood of the Gyeongju City, North Gyeongsang province, South Korea. It is bordered by Dodong-dong on the east, Tapjeong-dong on the west, Naenam-myeon on the south and Jungang-dong on the north. Its 20.5 square kilometers are home to about 8,885 people. It is both an administrative and legal dong.

The area contains the tourist attraction and shopping street Hwangnidan-gil.

Hwangnam-dong has one elementary school.

== See also ==
- Subdivisions of Gyeongju
- Administrative divisions of South Korea
