= Cheonbuk-myeon, Gyeongju =

Cheonbuk-myeon
- myeon
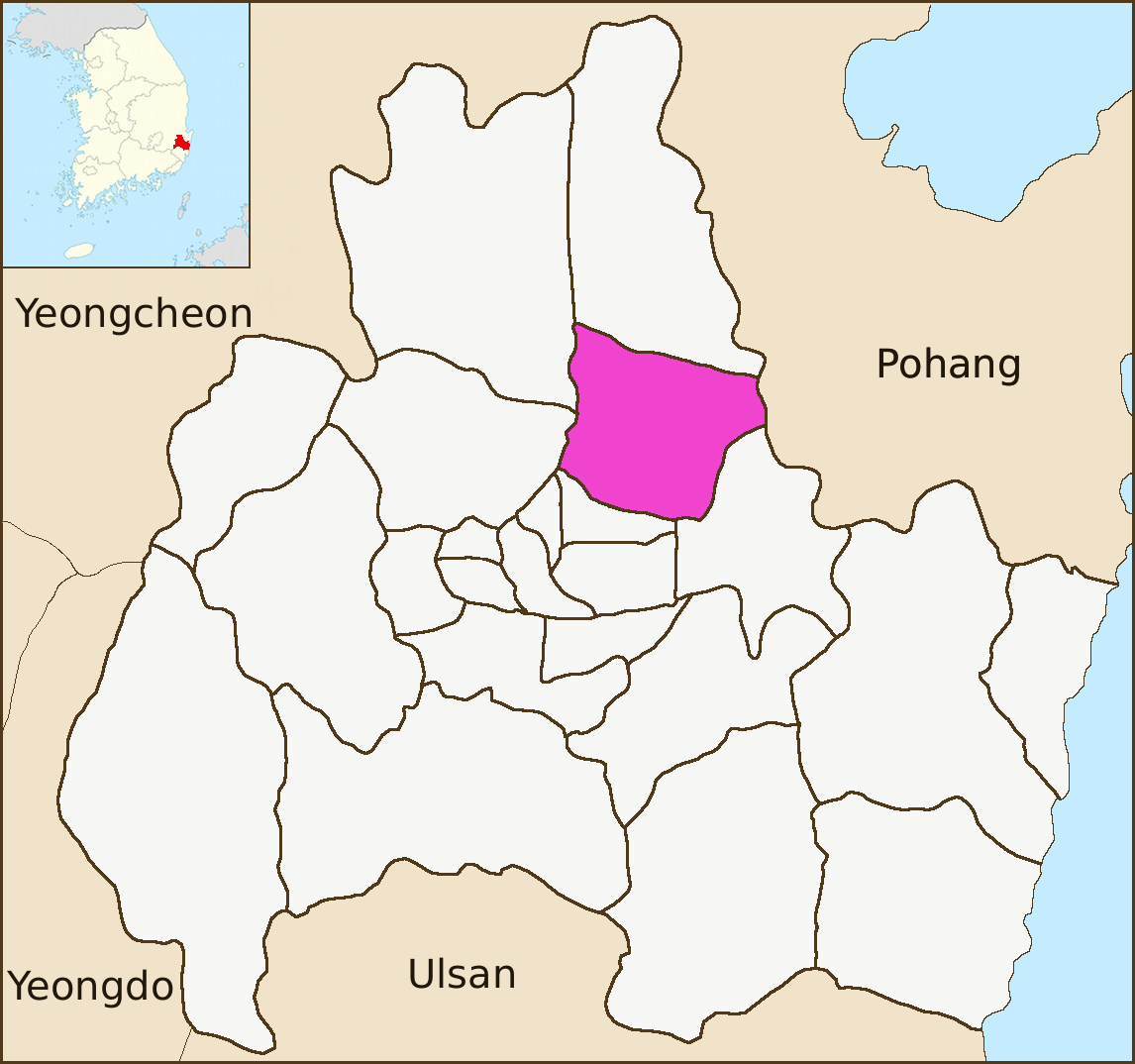

- Location within South Korea
- Coordinates: 35.90403°N 129.27461°E
- Country: South Korea
- Region: Gyeongju
- Administrative divisions: 17 administrative ri (9 legal ri), 74 ban

Government
  - Type: Gyeongju City

Area
  - Total: 58.15 km^{2} (22.45 sq mi)

Population (2006)
  - Total: 6,140
  - Density: 106/km^{2} (270/sq mi)
- Dialect: Gyeongsang dialect

Korean name
- Hangul: 천북면
- Hanja: 川北面
- RR: Cheonbuk-myeon
- MR: Ch'ŏnbuk-myŏn

Cheonbuk-myeon (Korean: 천북면) is a myeon, or township, in the administrative subdivisions of the Gyeongju City, North Gyeongsang province, South Korea. It is bordered by Pohang city to the east, Bodeok-dong to the south, Angang-eup and Hyeongok-myeon to the Hyeongsan River to the west and Gangdong-myeon to the north. Its 58.15 square kilometres (22.45 sq mi) are home to about 6,140 people. There are two elementary schools and one high school.

== Administrative divisions ==
- Galgok-ri (갈곡리)
- Deoksan-ri (덕산리)
- Dongsan-ri (동산리)
- Moa-ri (모아리)
- Mulcheon-ri (물천리)
- Seongji-ri (성지리)
- Sinang-ri (신당리)
- Oya-ri (오야리)
- Hwasan-ri (화산리)

== See also ==
- Subdivisions of Gyeongju
- Administrative divisions of South Korea
