= Bulguk-dong =

Coordinates: 35.775°N 129.301°E

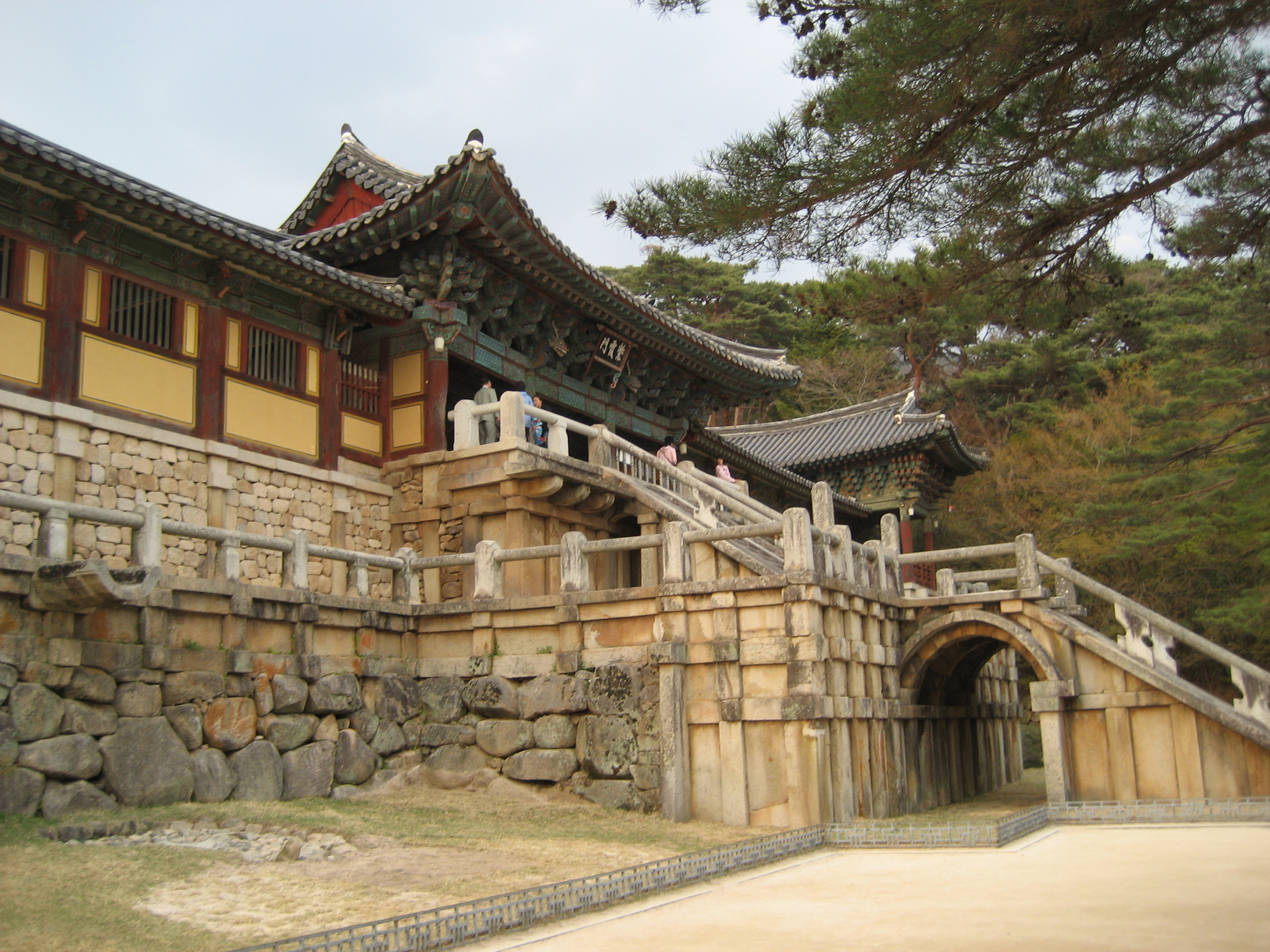
- Bulguksa temple in Bulguk-dong

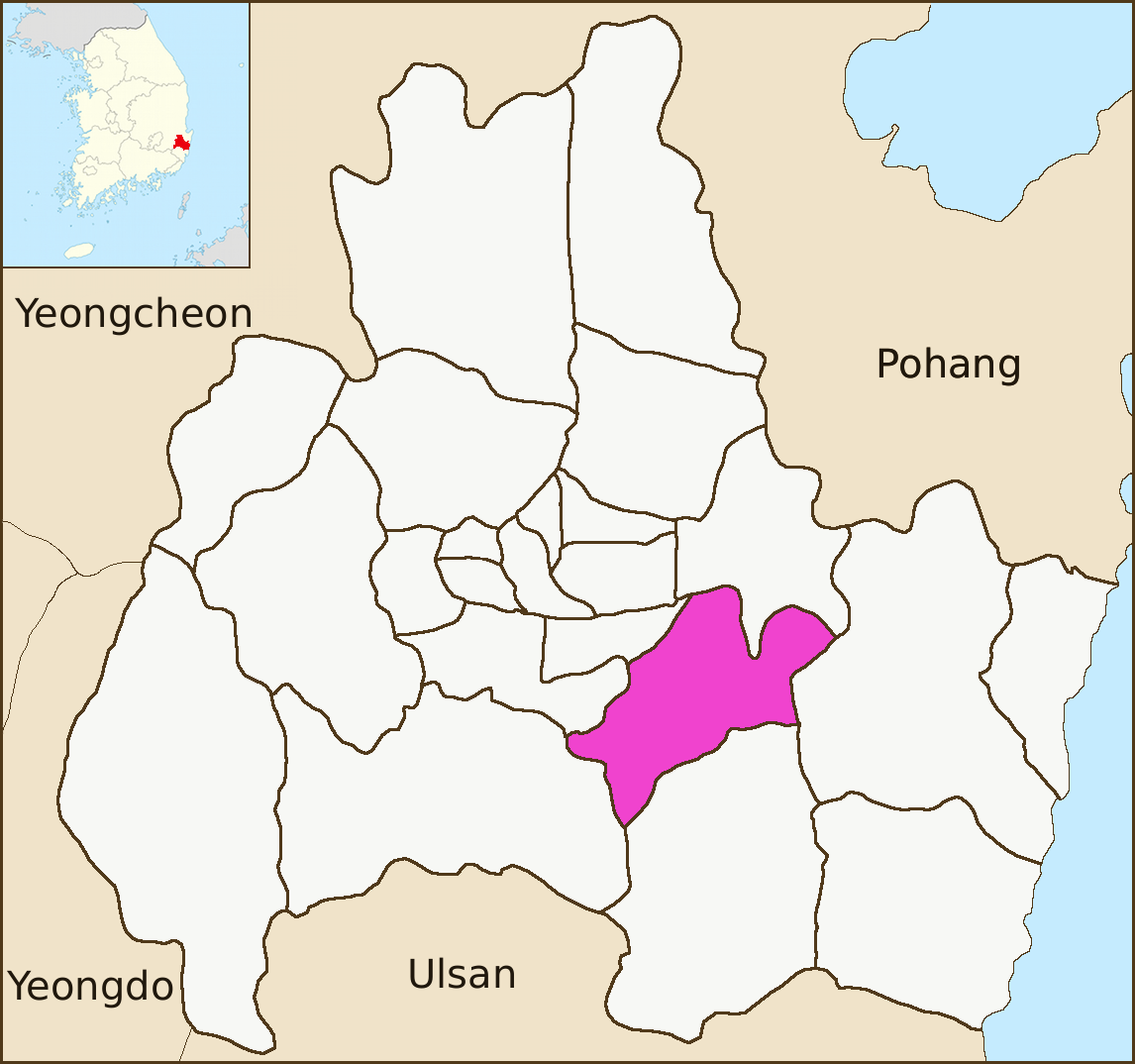
- Country: South Korea
- Region: Gyeongju

Government
  - Type: Gyeongju City

Area
  - Total: 37.34 km^{2} (14.42 sq mi)

Population (2008)
  - Total: 8,893
  - Density: 238.2/km^{2} (616.8/sq mi)
- Dialect: Gyeongsang dialect

Korean name
- Hangul: 불국동
- Hanja: 佛國洞
- RR: Bulguk-dong
- MR: Pulguk-tong

Bulguk-dong (Korean: 불국동) is an administrative dong (neighborhood) in the administrative subdivisions of the Gyeongju, South Korea. It consists of seven legal dong including Gujeong-dong, Sirae-dong, Si-dong, Joyang-dong, Jinhyeon-dong, Ma-dong and Ha-dong.

It is bordered by Tohamsan on the east, Dodong-dong on the west, Oedong-eup on the south and Bodeok-dong on the north. Its 37.34 square kilometers are home to about 8,893 people. Bulguksa temple and Seokguram grotto are situated in the district.

== Origin of the name ==
The name Bulguk originates from Bulguksa, a Buddhist temple that is designated as a UNESCO World Heritage Site. The term "Bulguk" translates to "Land of Buddha" and reflects the Buddhist concept of the Pure Land. It embodies a synthesis of key Buddhist philosophies, including those of the Pure Land (Jeongto), the Lotus Sutra (Beophwa), and the Avatamsaka (Hwaeom) schools.

== See also ==
- Subdivisions of Gyeongju
- Administrative divisions of South Korea
