= Hwango-dong =

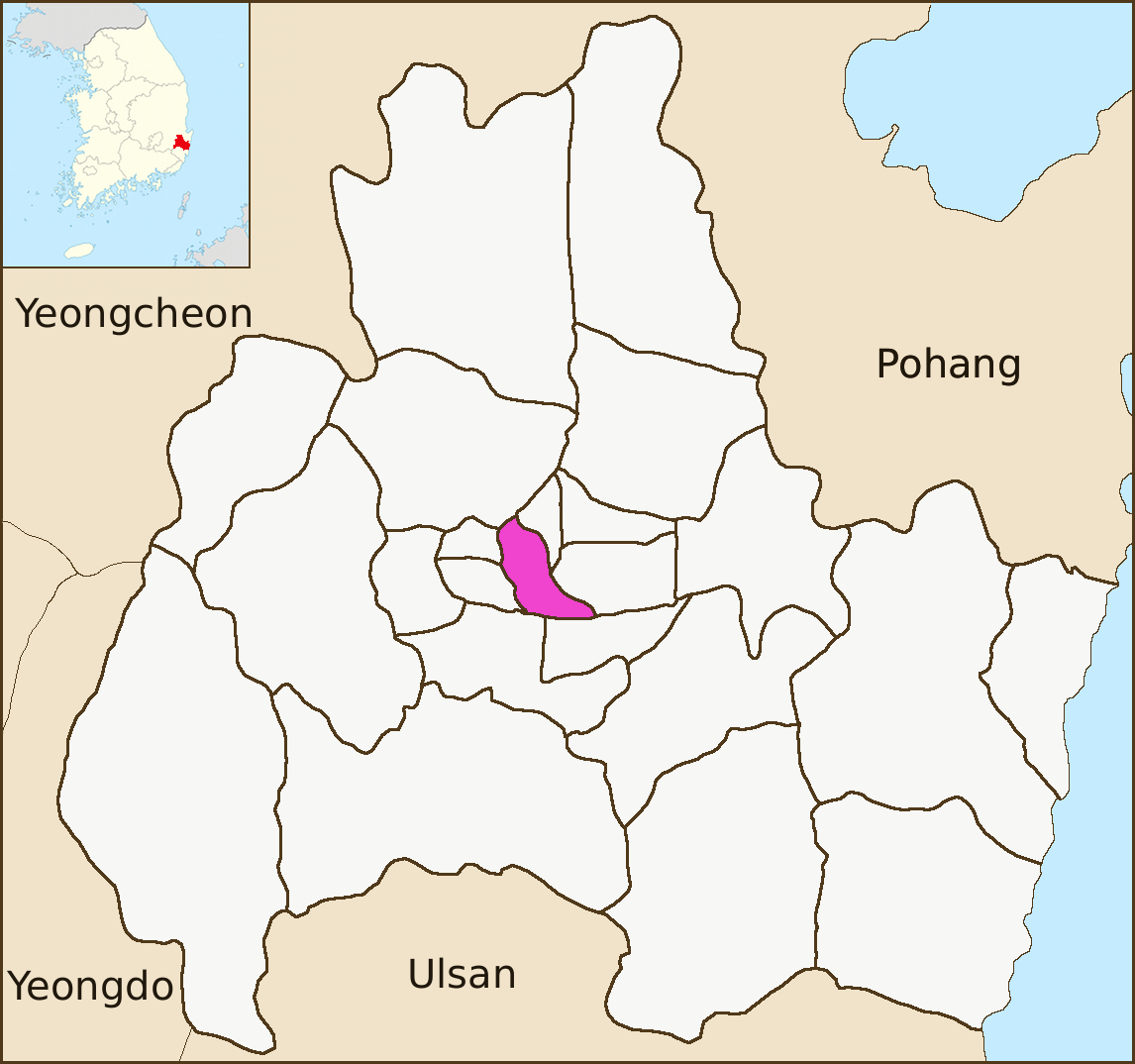
- Coordinates: 35°50′34″N 129°13′05″E
- Country: South Korea
- Region: Gyeongju

Government
  - Type: Gyeongju City

Area
  - Total: 1.5 km^{2} (0.58 sq mi)

Population (2008)
  - Total: 10,225
  - Density: 6,800/km^{2} (18,000/sq mi)
- Dialect: Gyeongsang dialect

Korean name
- Hangul: 황오동
- Hanja: 皇吾洞
- RR: Hwango-dong
- MR: Hwango-dong

Hwango-dong (Korean: 황오동) is a dong or a neighbourhood of the Gyeongju City, North Gyeongsang province, South Korea. It is located in the central Gyeongju and is bordered by Bohwang-dong on the east, Jangang-dong on the west, Hwangnam-dong on the south and Seongdong-dong on the north. Its 1.5 square kilometers are home to about 10225 people. It is both an administrative dong and legal dong.

The city's main railway station was located in the district. Hwango-dong has a middle school and a high school.

== Etymology ==
The name Hwang-o is believed to be a combination of Hwangchon (meaning "village near the royal palace of Silla") and Hwangobang, referring to the fifth administrative district among the six divisions mentioned in the Donggyeong Japgi (a historical record).

== See also ==
- Subdivisions of Gyeongju
- Administrative divisions of South Korea
