= Bodeok-dong =

Coordinates: 35.835°N 129.287°E

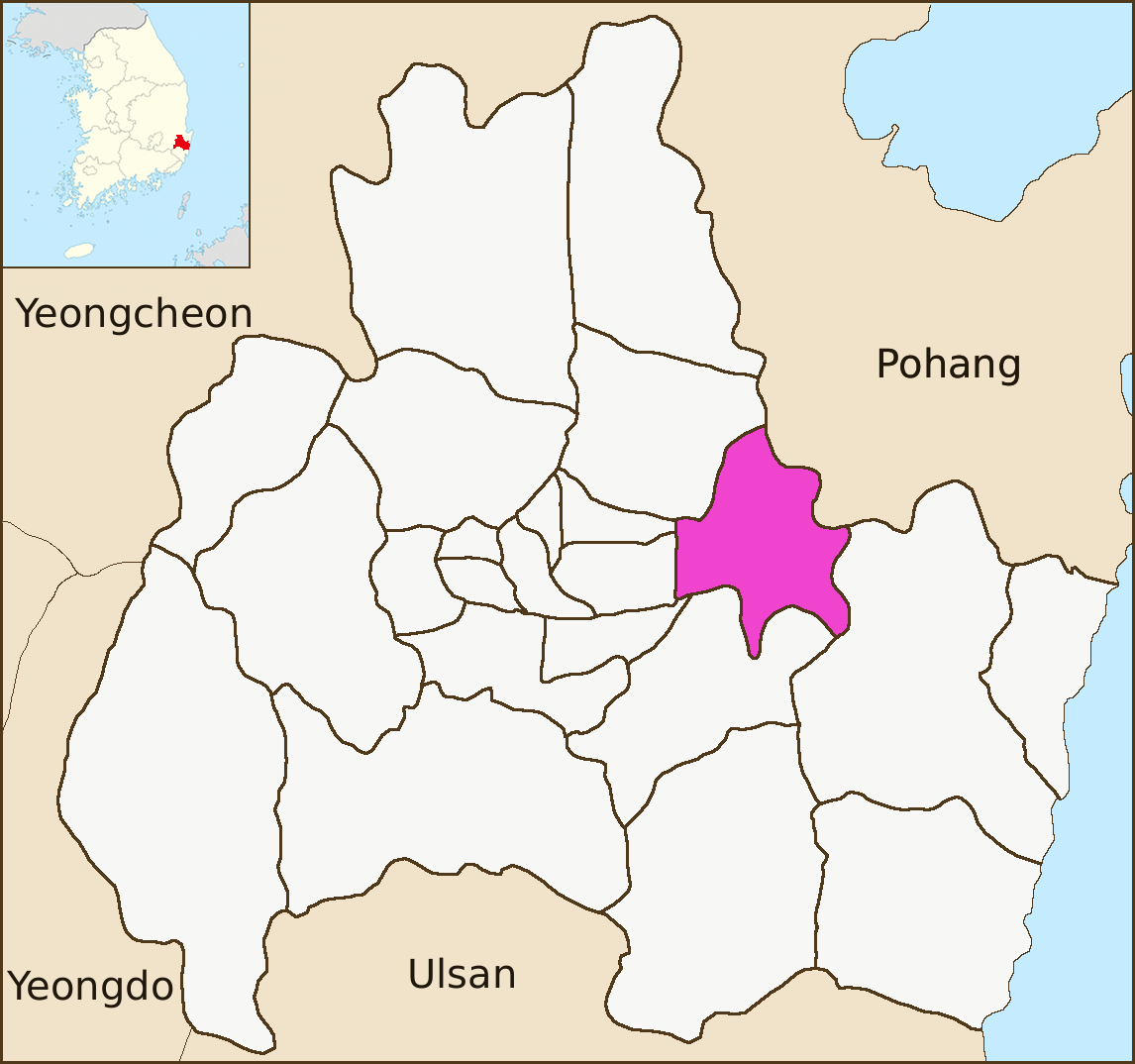
- Country: South Korea
- Region: Gyeongju

Government
  - Type: Gyeongju City

Area
  - Total: 80.97 km^{2} (31.26 sq mi)

Population (2008)
  - Total: 2,194
  - Density: 27.10/km^{2} (70.18/sq mi)
- Dialect: Gyeongsang dialect

Korean name
- Hangul: 보덕동
- Hanja: 普德洞
- RR: Bodeok-dong
- MR: Podŏk-tong

Bodeok-dong (Korean: 보덕동) is an administrative dong or a neighbourhood in the administrative subdivisions of the Gyeongju City, North Gyeongsang province, South Korea. It consists of seven legal dong including Cheongun-dong, Sinpyeong-dong, Bukgun-dong, Sogok-dong, Deok-dong, Hwangnyeong-dong and Amgok-dong

It is bordered by Yangbuk-myeon on the east, Wolseong-dong and Dongcheon-dong on the west, Bulguk-dong on the south and Cheonbuk-myeon and Pohang city on the north. Its 80.97 square kilometers are home to about 2,194 people. The population is served by one elementary school.

== See also ==
- Subdivisions of Gyeongju
- Administrative divisions of South Korea
