= Dongcheon-dong, Gyeongju =

Dongcheon-dong
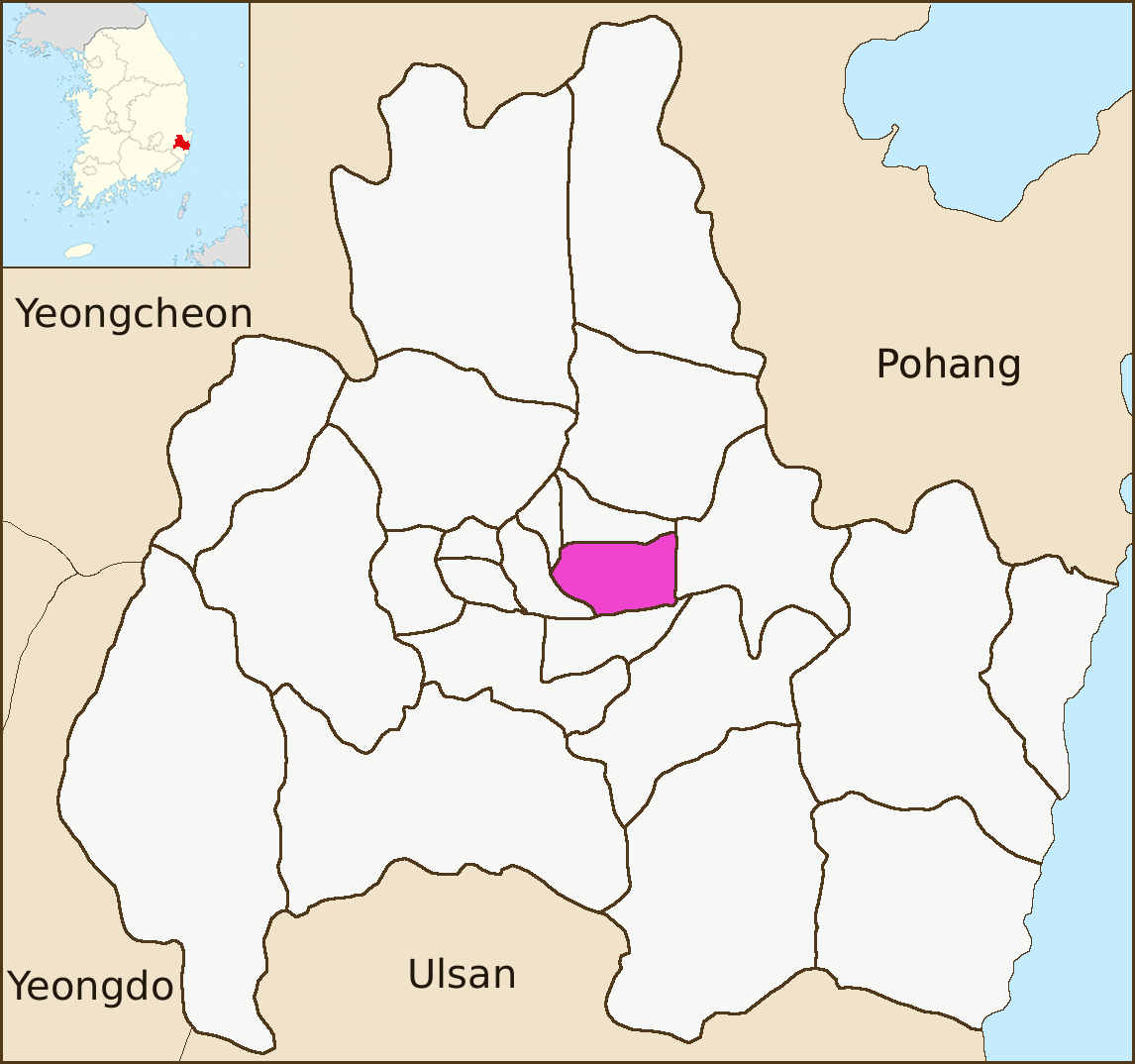
- Country: South Korea
- Region: Gyeongju

Government
  - Type: Gyeongju City

Area
  - Total: 5.26 km^{2} (2.03 sq mi)

Population (2008)
  - Total: 26,507
  - Density: 5,040/km^{2} (13,100/sq mi)
- Dialect: Gyeongsang dialect

Korean name
- Hangul: 동천동
- Hanja: 東川洞
- RR: Dongcheon-dong
- MR: Tongch'ŏn-dong

Dongcheon-dong (Korean: 동천동) is both an administrative and legal dong or a neighbourhood of the Gyeongju City, North Gyeongsang province, South Korea. It is bordered by Bodeok-dong on the east, Yonggang-dong and Seongdong-dong on the west, Bohwang-dong on the south and Cheonbuk-myeon on the north. Its 5.26 square kilometers are home to about 26,507 people. After the liberation of Korea, returnees from abroad were numerous; a village for them was constructed in present-day Dongcheon-dong.

Dongcheon-dong has one elementary school and Gyeonghui School established for the mentally disabled.

== See also ==
- Subdivisions of Gyeongju
- Administrative divisions of South Korea
