= Angang-eup =

Angang
- eup
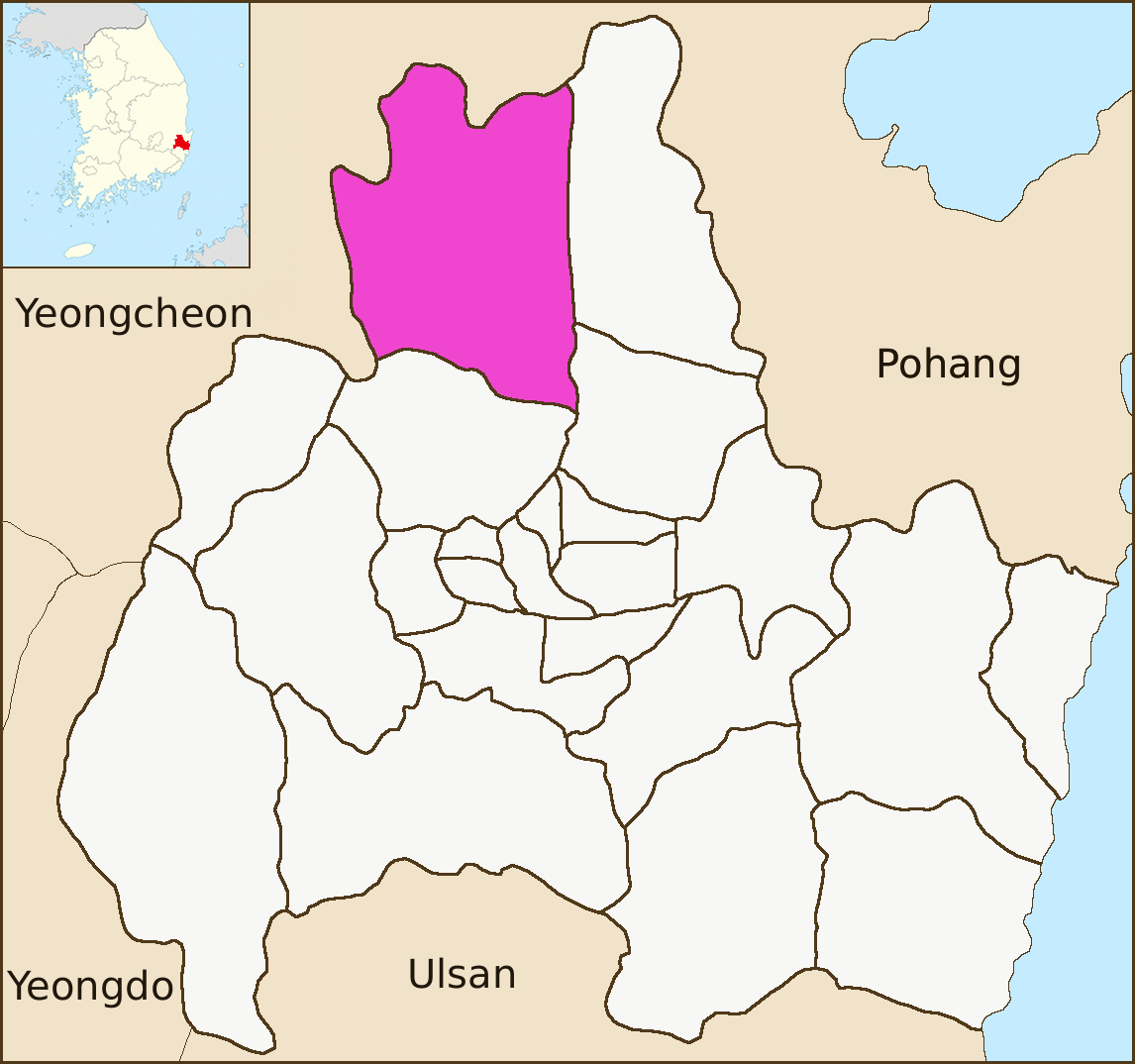

- Location within South Korea
- Coordinates: 35.990°N 129.227°E
- Country: South Korea
- Administrative divisions: 45 administrative ri (15 legal ri), 362 ban

Government
  - Type: Gyeongju City

Area
  - Total: 139.08 km^{2} (53.70 sq mi)

Population (2008)
  - Total: 33,333
  - Density: 240/km^{2} (620/sq mi)
- Dialect: Gyeongsang dialect

Korean name
- Hangul: 안강읍
- Hanja: 安康邑
- RR: Angang-eup
- MR: An'gang-ŭp

Angang-eup (Korean: 안강읍) is an eup, or town, and the second-largest subdivision of Gyeongju City. Its 139 square kilometers are home to about 33,300 people and is served by six elementary schools and two joint middle-high schools. Situated next to Gangdong-myeon in the city's northern tip, it is a significant town in its own right. Angang Station is a regular stop on the Donghae Nambu Line. The town center lies on the Hyeongsan River, near where it meets the small Chilpyeongcheon stream. Important local products include rice, apples, and grapes.

== Etymology ==
The area now known as Angang was originally an uninhabited riverine region. Over time, changes in the flow of the Chilpyeongcheon (Chilpyeong Stream) led to the formation of residential settlements. During the reign of King Gyeongdeok of the Silla dynasty, the name "Angang" was adopted, reportedly reflecting a desire for stability and tranquility among local residents.

== Administrative divisions ==
- Gapsan-ri (갑산리)
- Ganggyo-ri (강교리)
- Geomdan-ri (검단리)
- Geungye-ri (근계리)
- Nodang-ri (노당리)
- Daedong-ri (대동리)
- Duryu-ri (두류리)
- Sabang-ri (사방리)
- Sandae-ri (산대리)
- Angang-ri (안강리)
- Yangwol-ri (양월리)
- Oksan-ri (옥산리)
- Uktong-ri (육통리)
- Cheongnyeong-ri (청령리)
- Hagok-ri (하곡리)

== See also ==
- Subdivisions of Gyeongju
- Administrative divisions of South Korea
