= Hyeongsan River =

River in southeastern South Korea

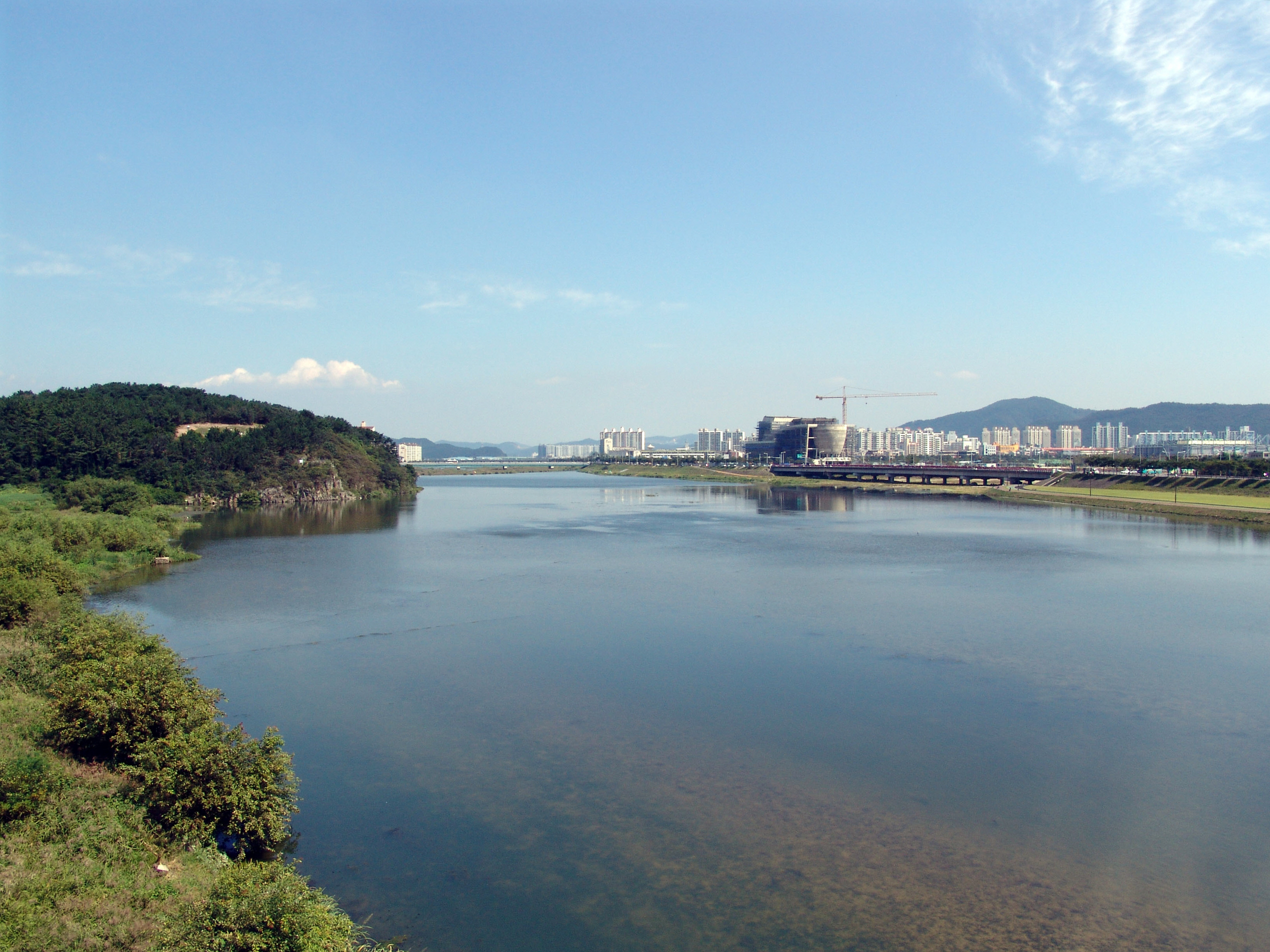
- Hyeongsan River from Dong Bridge in Gyeongju, Korea.

Korean name
- Hangul: 형산강
- Hanja: 兄山江
- RR: Hyeongsangang
- MR: Hyŏngsan'gang

The Hyeongsan River is a river in southeastern South Korea. It flows from Baeyanggol Valley (배양골), Wolpyeong-ri (월평리/月坪里), Dudong-myeon (두동면/斗東面), Ulju County in Ulsan to the Sea of Japan, covering a distance of about 62 km. The Hyeongsan watershed covers roughly 1,167 km^{2} (Jo 1987:35).

The Hyeongsan flows north from near the northern border of Greater Ulsan into Gyeongju, where it enters the Gyeongju Basin and is joined by the Bukcheon stream (북천/北川), a major tributary. It continues north into Pohang, and in Angang-eup of Pohang it is joined by the Gigyecheon flowing from the north and turns abruptly eastward. From there runs east and slightly north until it meets the Sea of Japan at Pohang Harbor. The estuary of the Hyeongsan has been covered by the massive industrial development around the port of Pohang, including the POSCO steel mill.

== History ==
The Hyeongsan is primarily notable for the Silla civilization which arose within its valley, centered at Gyeongju.

Middle Jeulmun Pottery Period potsherds have been unearthed in the Hyeongsan Basin. Several significant Mumun settlements arose along the river after 1100 BC, notably Wolsan-ri and Hwangseong-dong (FPCP 2005; GNRICH 2003).

== Economy ==
Today the Hyeongsan continues to play a role in local transport, as it has for thousands of years. Although very little boat traffic is found on the river, the river valley still provides an important transportation corridor. Highways connecting Ulsan, Gyeongju and Pohang follow the river's course, as does the Donghae Nambu Line passenger railway from Gyeongju to Pohang.

The sprawling industrial facilities of Pohang Iron and Steel (POSCO) and INI Steel are located in Pohang just south of the mouth of the Hyeongsan. The eastern bank of the river in the suburbs north of the old city of Gyeongju are the home to many industrial facilities.

== Gallery ==
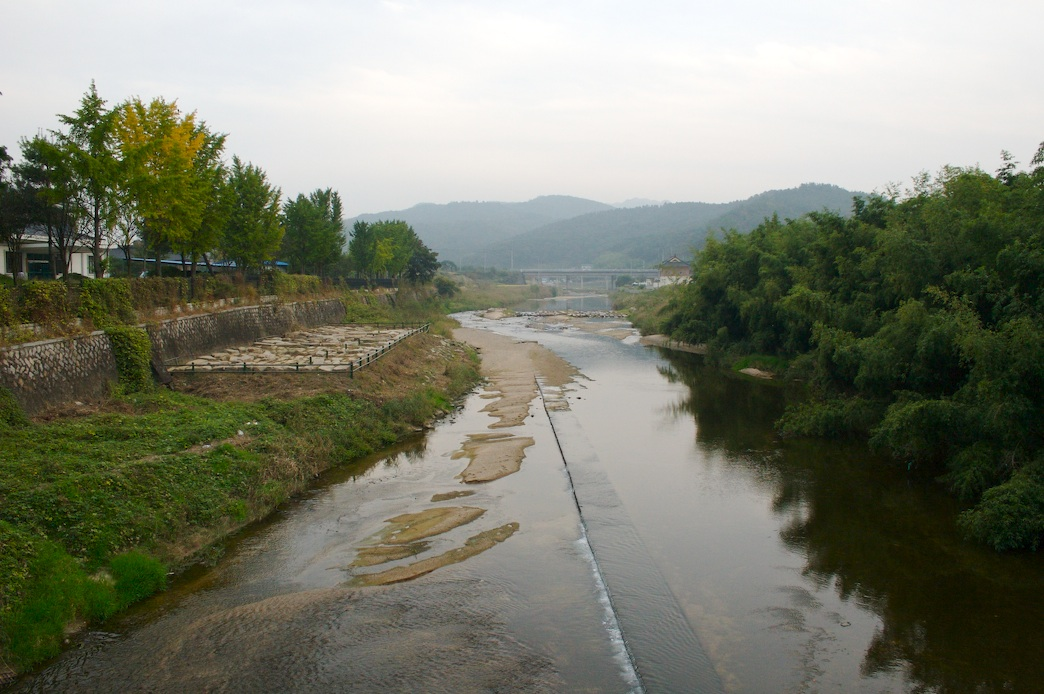
Namcheon Stream in Gyeongju, a tributary steam of Hyeongsan River

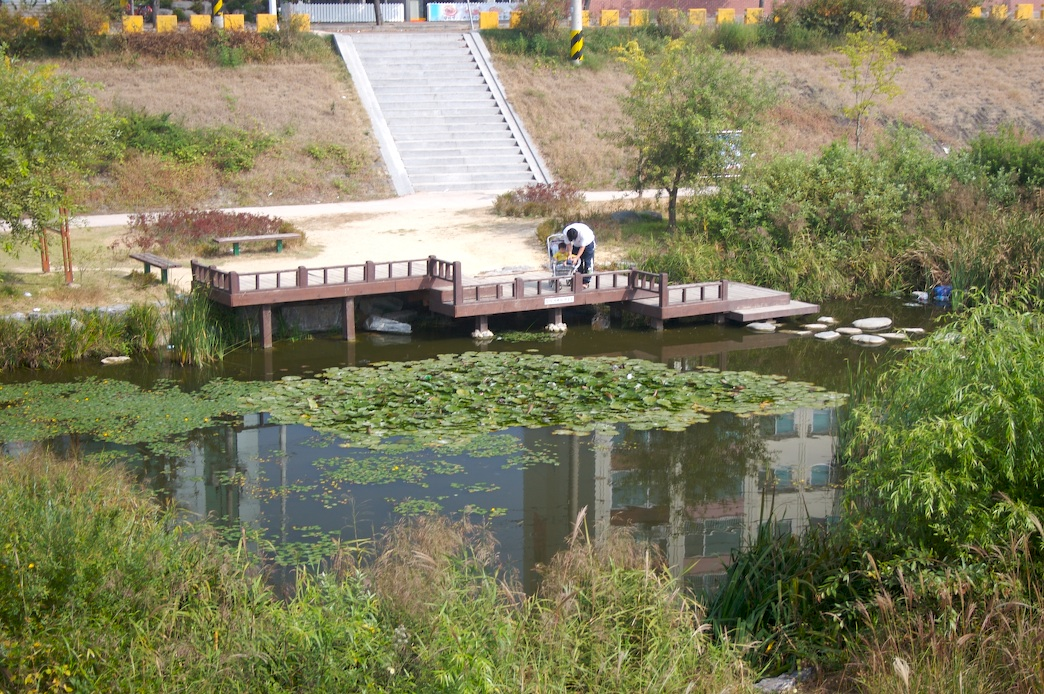
Bukcheon Stream in Gyeongju, a tributary steam of Hyeongsan River

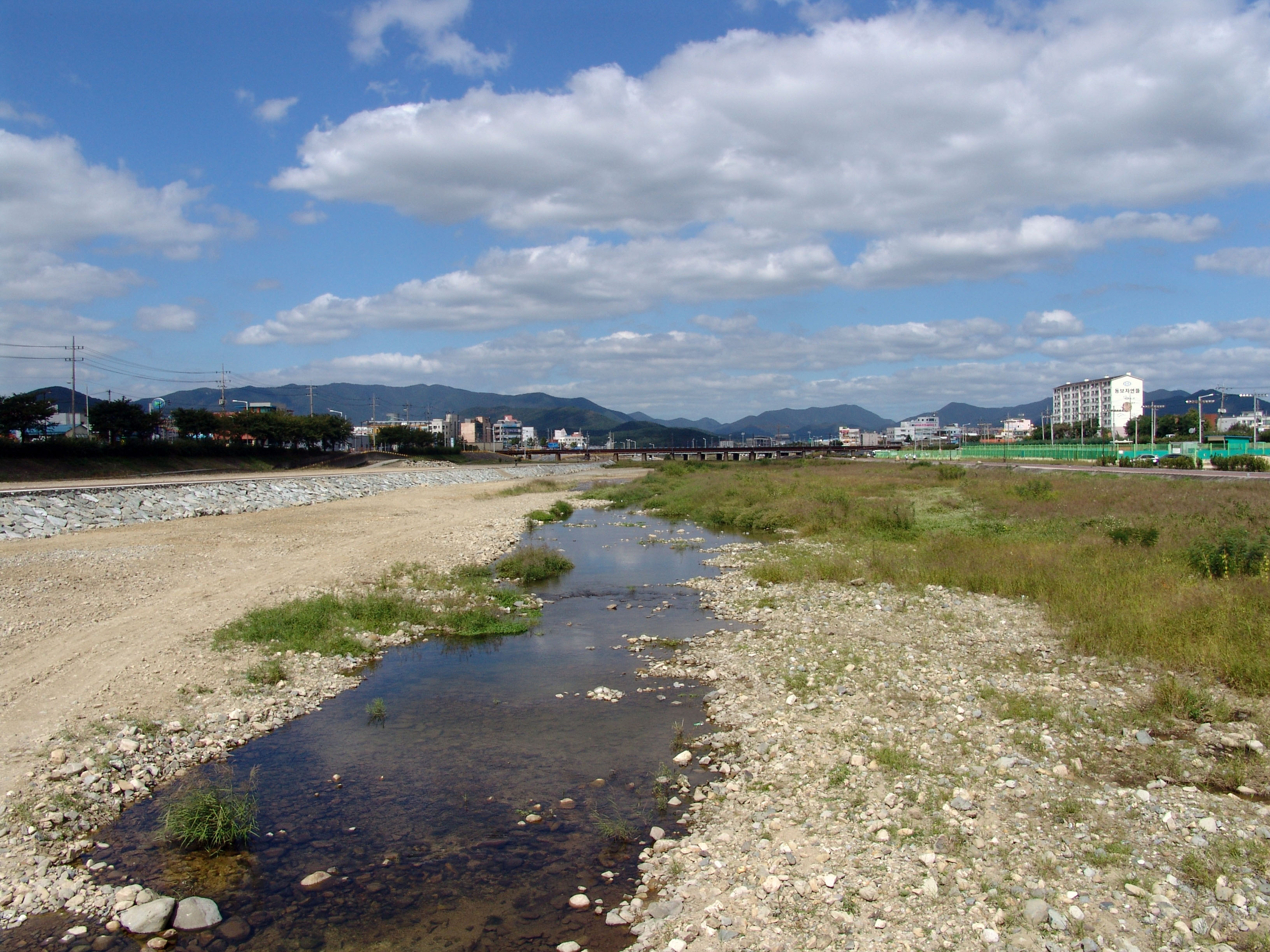
Bukcheon Stream from Subukjamsugyo Bridge.

== See also ==
- Rivers of Asia
- Rivers of Korea
- Geography of South Korea
