= Oedong =

- eup
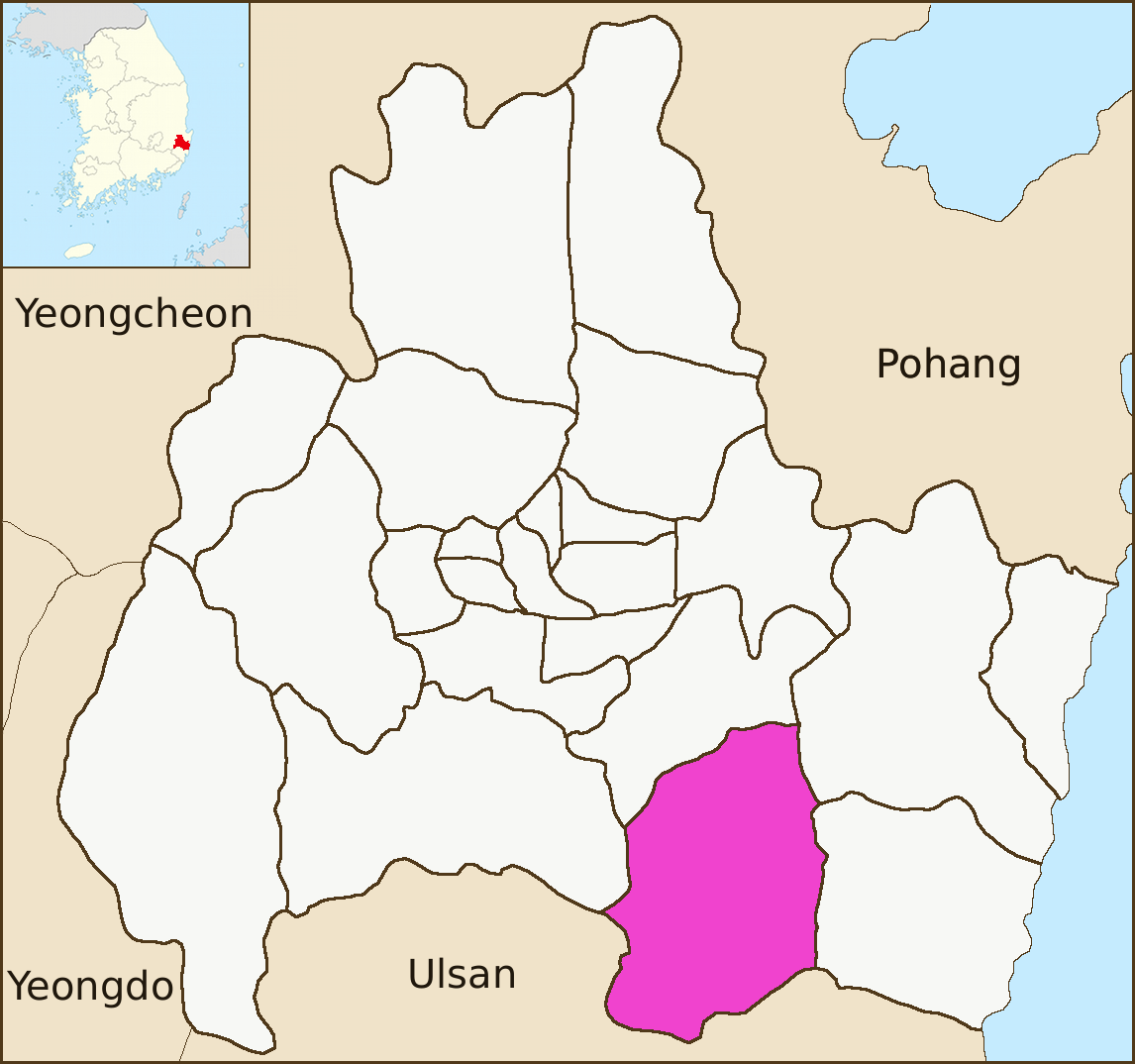
- Country: South Korea
- Administrative divisions: 31 administrative ri (17 legal ri), 200 ban

Government
  - Type: Gyeongju City

Area
  - Total: 110.34 km^{2} (42.60 sq mi)

Population (2006)
  - Total: 17,539
  - Density: 159/km^{2} (410/sq mi)
- Dialect: Gyeongsang dialect

Korean name
- Hangul: 외동읍
- Hanja: 外東邑
- RR: Oedong-eup
- MR: Oedong-ŭp

Oedong-eup (Korean: 외동읍) is an eup or a town in the subdivision of the Gyeongju City, North Gyeongsang province, South Korea. Its 139 square kilometers are home to about 17, 500 people. It is linked by road and rail to the neighboring metropolis of Ulsan. Due to the feature, the town has been a center of the development of Gyeongju's automotive parts industry. Three industrial complexes are located here. This population is served by six elementary schools, a middle school, and a high school

== Administrative divisions ==
- Gaegok-ri (개곡리)
- Gwaereung-ri (괘릉리)
- Gueo-ri (구어리)
- Naengcheon-ri (냉천리)
- Nokdong-ri (녹동리)
- Malbang-ri (말방리)
- Mohwa-ri (모화리)
- Munsan-ri (문산리)
- Bangeo-ri (방어리)
- Bukto-ri (북토리)
- Seokgye-ri (석계리)
- Singye-ri (신계리)
- Yeonan-ri (연안리)
- Ipsil-ri (입실리)
- Jenae-ri (제내리)
- Jukdong-ri (죽동리)
- Hwalseong-ri (활성리)

== See also ==
- Subdivisions of Gyeongju
- Administrative divisions of South Korea
