= Naenam-myeon =

- myeon
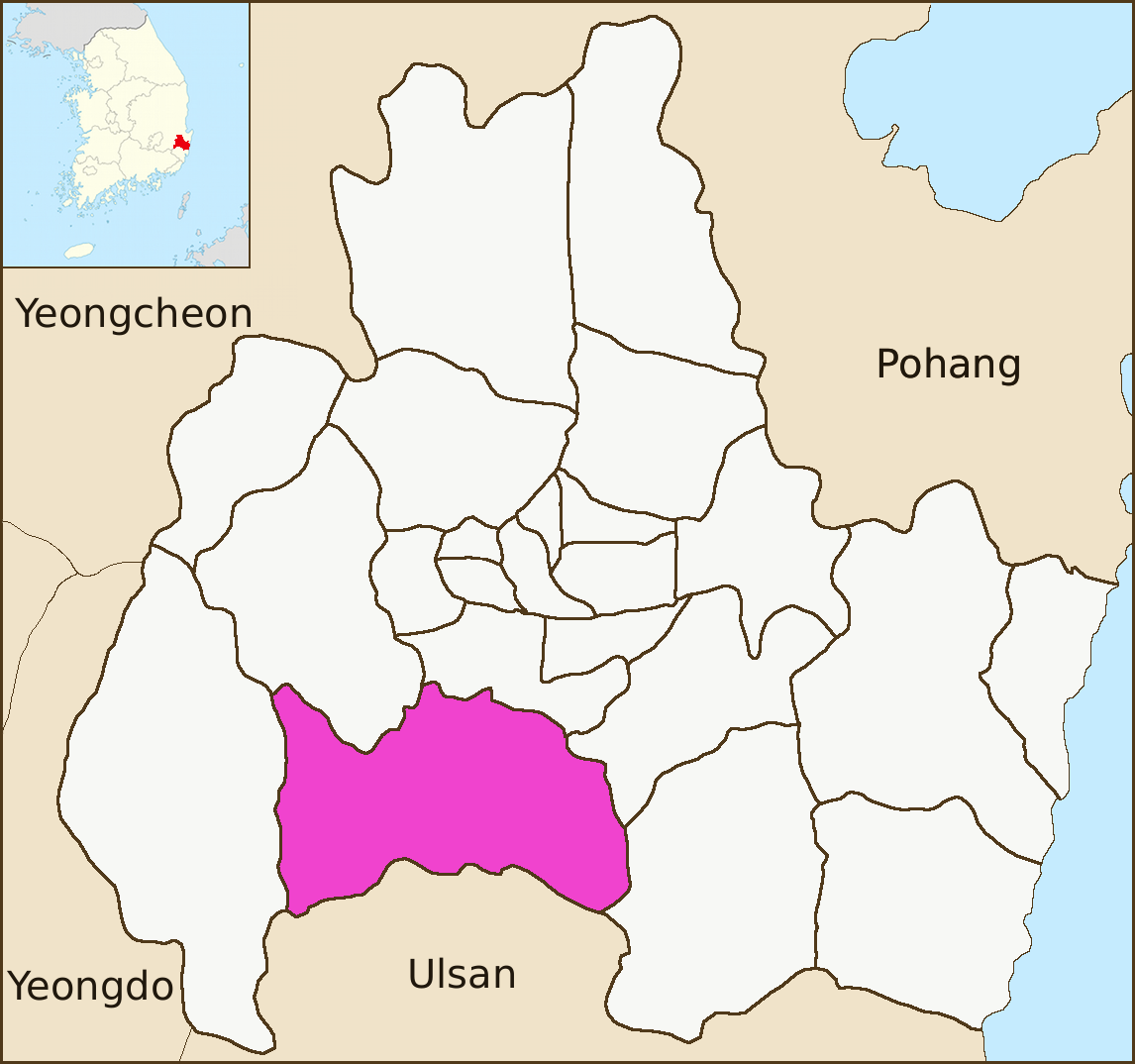

- Location within South Korea
- Coordinates: 35.752°N 129.198°E
- Country: South Korea
- Region: Gyeongju
- Administrative divisions: 34 administrative ri (13 legal ri), 114 ban

Government
  - Type: Gyeongju City

Area
  - Total: 122.05 km^{2} (47.12 sq mi)

Population (2006)
  - Total: 6,142
  - Density: 50/km^{2} (130/sq mi)
- Dialect: Gyeongsang dialect

Korean name
- Hangul: 내남면
- Hanja: 內南面
- RR: Naenam-myeon
- MR: Naenam-myŏn

Naenam-myeon (Korean: 내남면) is a myeon or a township in the administrative subdivisions of the Gyeongju City, North Gyeongsang province, South Korea. It is bordered by Geumo Mountains on the east, Jusa Mountains on the south. Its 122.05 square kilometers are home to about 6,142 people. This population is served by one elementary school and one high school.

== Administrative divisions ==
- Nogok-ri (노곡리)
- Deokcheon-ri (덕천리)
- Mangseong-ri (망성리)
- Myeonggye-ri (명계리)
- Bakdal-ri (박달리)
- Buji-ri (부지리)
- Biji-ri (비지리)
- Sangsin-ri (상신리)
- Ansim-ri (안심리)
- Yongjang-ri (용장리
- Wolsan-ri (월산리)
- Ijo-ri (이조리)
- Hwagok-ri (화곡리)

== See also ==
- Subdivisions of Gyeongju
- Administrative divisions of South Korea
