= Geoncheon =

- eup
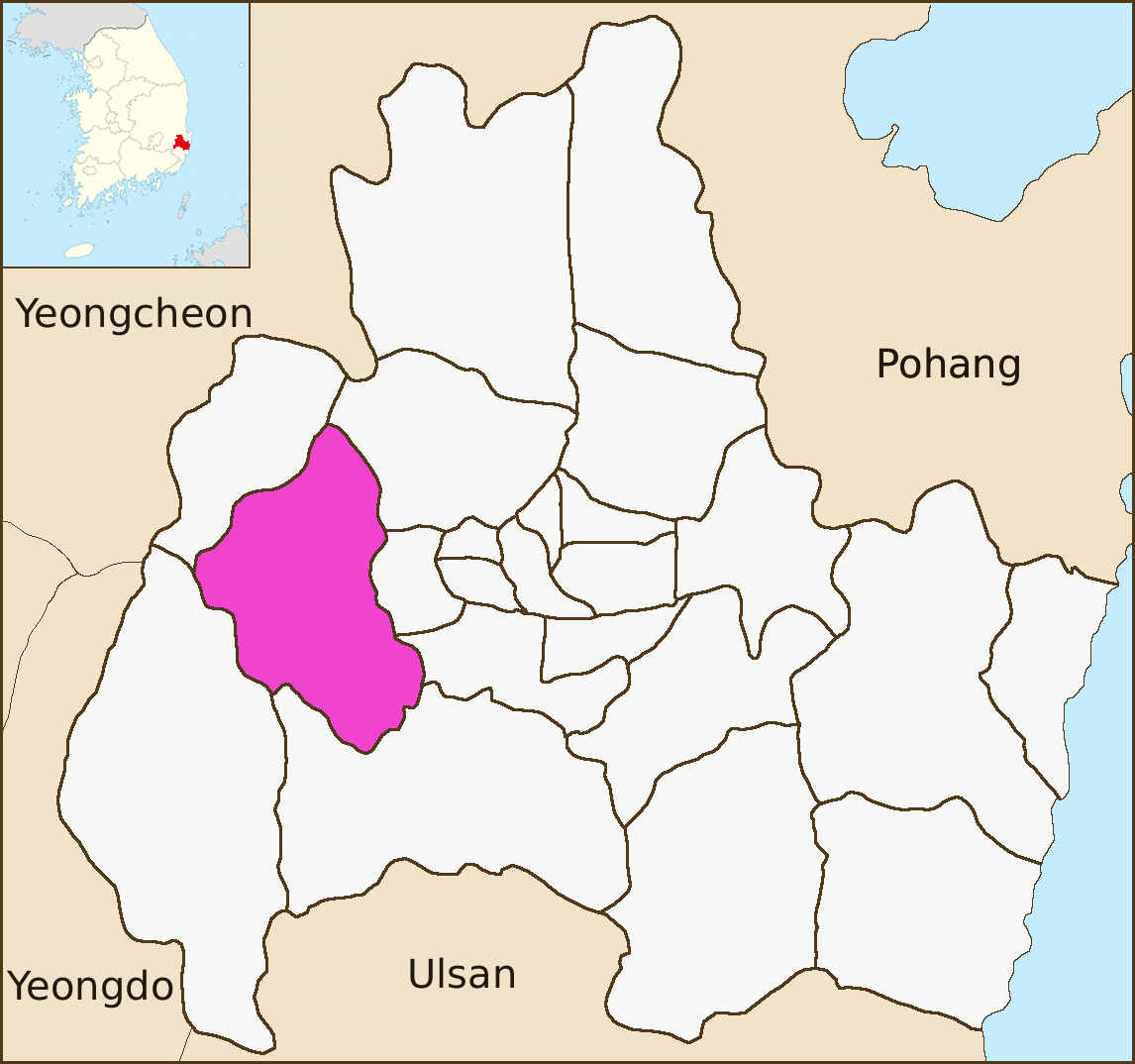
- Country: South Korea
- Region: Gyeongju
- Administrative divisions: 24 administrative ri (11 legal ri)

Government
  - Type: Gyeongju City

Area
  - Total: 90.46 km^{2} (34.93 sq mi)

Population (2008)
  - Total: 10,844
  - Density: 120/km^{2} (310/sq mi)
- Dialect: Gyeongsang dialect

Korean name
- Hangul: 건천읍
- Hanja: 乾川邑
- RR: Geoncheon-eup
- MR: Kŏnch'ŏn-ŭp

Geoncheon-eup (Korean: 건천읍) is an eup or a town in the subdivision of the Gyeongju City, North Gyeongsang province, South Korea. Its 90.46 square kilometers are home to about 10,844 people. This population is served by three elementary schools, and one joint middle-high school.

== Administrative divisions ==
- Geoncheon-ri (건천리)
- Geumcheok-ri (금척리)
- Daegok-ri (대곡리)
- Moryang-ri (모량리)
- Bangnae-ri (방내리)
- Seungseon-ri (승선리)
- Sinpyeong-ri (신평리)
- Yongmyeong-ri (용명리)
- Jojeon-ri (조전리)
- Cheonpo-ri (천포리)
- Hwacheon-ri (화천리)

== See also ==
- Subdivisions of Gyeongju
- Administrative divisions of South Korea
