= 新聞 =

新闻/新聞 is an East Asian language vocabulary.

- Shimbun: "Journals" or "newspapers" in Japanese.
- Sinmun (disambiguation) (신문): "Journals" or "newspapers" in Korean.
- Tân văn: "Journals" or "newspapers" in Vietnamese.
  - Lục Tỉnh Tân Văn, Vietnamese newspaper.
- Xinwen: "news" in Chinese.
  - Xinwen Lianbo: daily news programme produced by China Central Television.
