= Seoak Seowon =

Korean private school

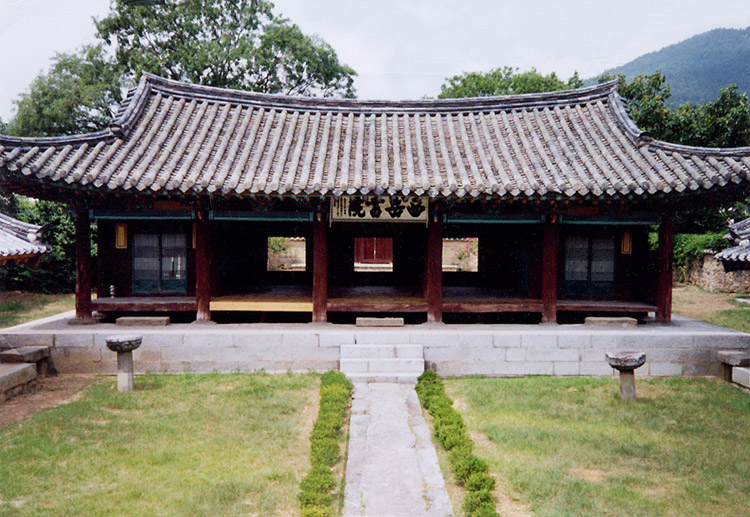

- Location within South Korea
- Coordinates: 35°49′39″N 129°11′19″E

- Seoak Seowon
- Hangul: 서악서원
- Hanja: 西岳書院
- RR: Seoak seowon
- MR: Sŏak sŏwŏn

The Seoak Seowon is a seowon located in the neighborhood of Seoak-dong, Gyeongju, North Gyeongsang Province, South Korea. Seowon was a type of local academy during the Joseon Dynasty (1392–1897). It was established by local Confucian scholars especially Yi Jeong (李楨 1578 - 1607) in 1651, the second year of King Hyojong's reign, to commemorate the virtue and scholarly achievements of scholar Seol Chong, and Ch'oe Ch'i-wŏn and General Kim Yu-sin. The enshrined people played important roles in the unification of Three Kingdoms of Korea into Unified Silla.

== See also ==
- Oksan Seowon, Gyeongju
- Korean Confucianism
