= Gyo-dong, Gyeongju =

Neighborhood in Gyeongju, South Korea

- Hangul: 교동
- Hanja: 校洞
- RR: Gyo-dong
- MR: Kyo-dong

Gyo-dong (Korean: 교동) is a dong or neighborhood in the city of Gyeongju, North Gyeongsang province, South Korea. It is one of the legal dong under the jurisdiction of its administrative dong, Wolseong-dong. The name, Gyo-dong originates from the fact that the area once had a hyanggyo, a government-managed Confucian academy, during the Goryeo and Joseon dynasties. It belonged to Bunae-myeon, Gyeongju County (Gyeongju-gun) during the late period of the Joseon Dynasty. Gyo-dong was variously called Hyanggyotgol, Gyochon or Gyori at the time.

Dorurang Mountain (Dorurangsan) with a height of 95 meters, lies across Gyo-dong, and nearby neighborhoods, Inwang-dong, and Tap-dong.

Cultural properties in Gyo-dong include not only tangible heritage such as Gyeongju Hyanggyo (Gyeognju Confucian Academy), Choe Sik's house, Gyeongju Samuso (Gyeongju's local council for government officers), and the Cheongwan temple site (Cheongwansaji), but also Gyeongju Gyo-dong beopju (a rice wine), which has been designated as an Important Intangible Cultural Property.

== See also ==
- Yangdong Village of Gyeongju
- Hahoe Folk Village
