= Yi Ŏnjŏk =

Korean philosopher (1491–1553)

- Hangul: 이언적
- Hanja: 李彦迪
- RR: I Eonjeok
- MR: I Ŏnjŏk

Art name
- Hangul: 회재, 자계옹
- Hanja: 晦齋, 紫溪翁
- RR: Hoejae, Jagyeong
- MR: Hoejae, Chagyeong

Courtesy name
- Hangul: 복고
- Hanja: 復古
- RR: Bokgo
- MR: Pokko

Yi Ŏnjŏk (Korean: 이언적; Hanja: 李彦迪; 25 November 1491 – 23 November 1553), sometimes known by his art name Hoejae, was a Korean philosopher and politician during the Joseon dynasty. He was a public official and intellectual of the middle era of the Joseon period of Korea. He was born and died in Gyeongju, then the capital of Gyeongsang province. Like most intellectuals from Gyeongsang in this period, he was a member of the Sarim faction. He contributed to the without ultimate-supreme ultimate (mugŭk-t'aegŭk) debate in classical Korean Confucianism.

A scion of the Yeoju Yi clan, he passed the literary section of the kwagŏ in 1514 and entered government service. He was twice expelled from service and then re-hired due to factional strife. He was exiled after Fourth Literati Purge of 1545. He spent the intervening periods teaching on Jaok Mountain in Gyeongju. After his death, the Oksan Seowon was erected on Jaok Mountain to venerate his memory. It still stands today in Angang-eup, Gyeongju City, North Gyeongsang, South Korea.

It was excoriated in Uijeongbu Yeongui Pavilion in 1568 and was established in Jongmyo Shrine in 1569 (King Seonjo 2), and was engaged in Mungmyeong in 1610 (Gwanghagun 2). In addition, the ancestral tablets were enshrined in 17 Seowon schools across the country, including Oksan Seowon in Gyeongju. Yi's main work is titled " Yi Ŏnjŏk's Old Baseon", and is designated as Treasure No. 586. Other writings are kept at Dok-rak and Oksan Seowon.

Through his adoptive son, Yi eventually became the maternal adoptive great-great-great-great-grandfather of Queen Inhyeon, the second wife of King Sukjong.

== Family ==
- Father
  - Yi Pŏn (이번; 李蕃; 1463 – February 1500)
- Mother
  - Lady Son of the Gyeongju Son clan (경주 손씨; 1469 – June 1548)
- Wife
  - Lady Pak of the Hamyang Pak clan (정경부인 함양 박씨; 1493 – ?); daughter of Pak Sungbu (박숭부, 朴崇阜; 1476-?)
- Issue
  - Adoptive son - Yi Ŭng-in (이응인; 李膺仁; 1535–1593); son of Yi T'ong (이통; 李應仁) and Lady Yi (이씨)
- Concubine and issue
  - Lady Sŏk of the Yangju Sŏk clan (양주 석씨; 1495 – ?); daughter of Sŏk Kwidong (석귀동)
    - Son - Yi Chŏn-in (이전인; 李全仁; 1516–1568)

== See also ==
- Korean philosophy
- History of Korea
