= Gampo-eup =

Gampo
- eup
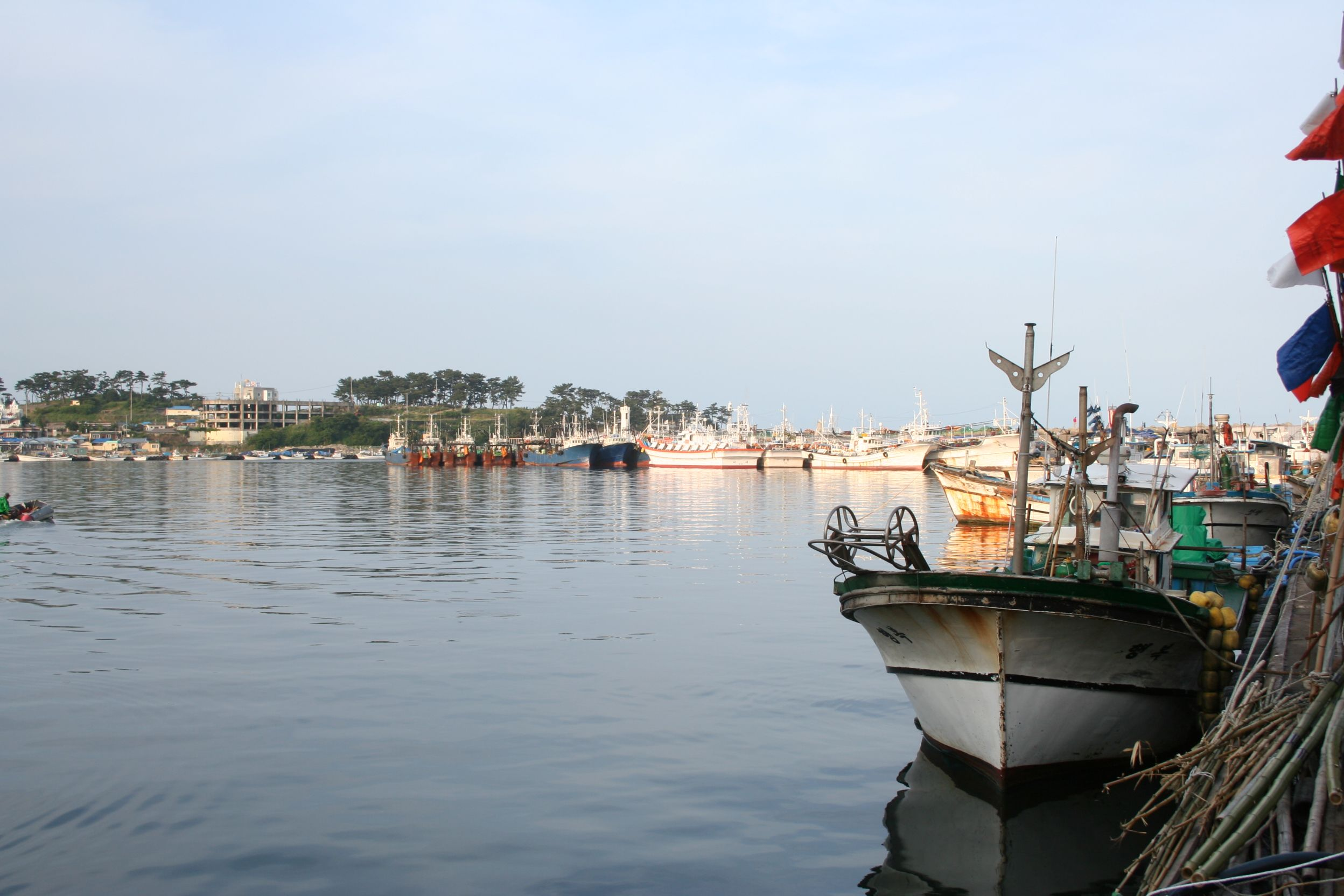
- Gampo Harbor

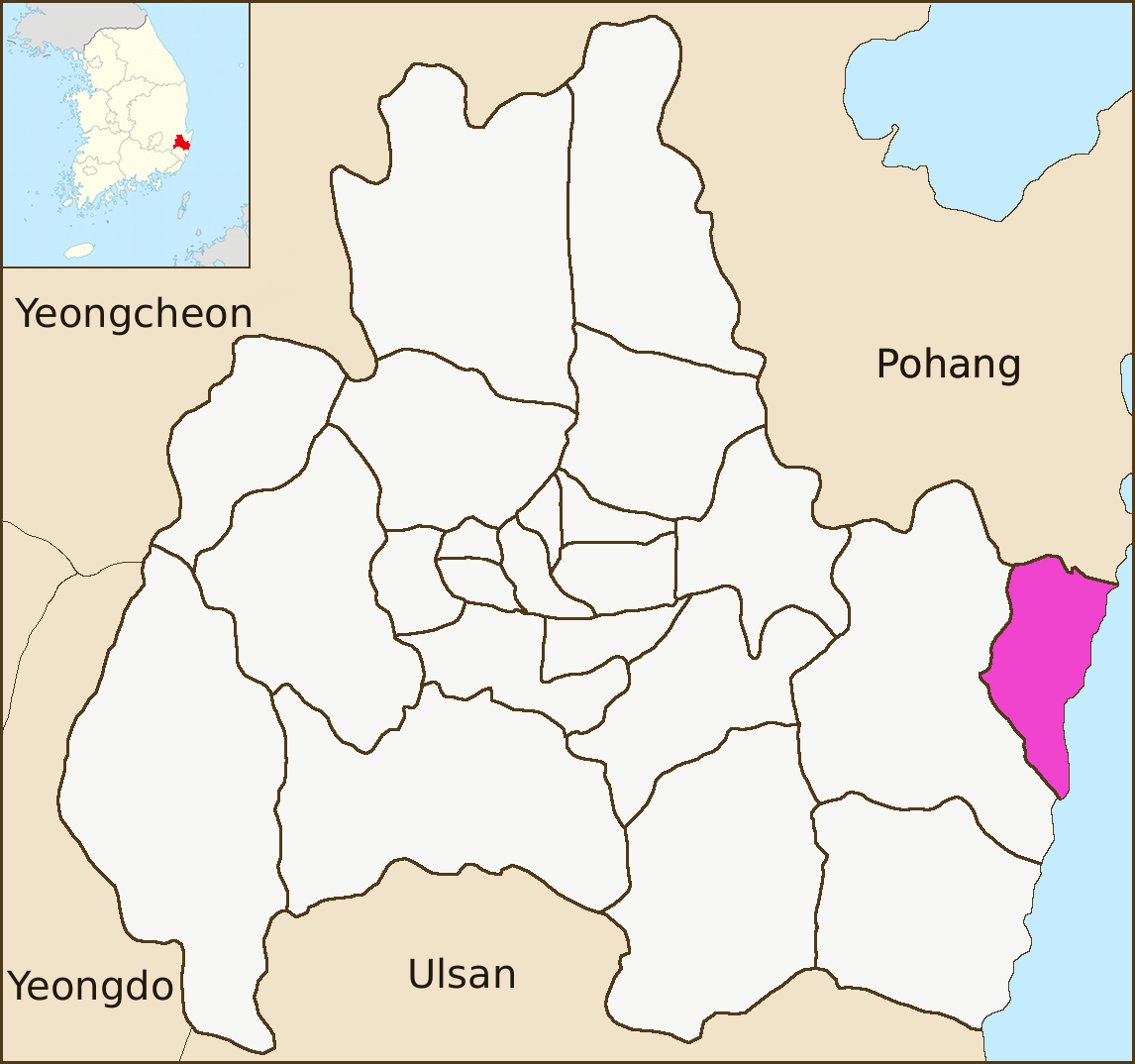
- Country: South Korea
- Administrative divisions: 20 administrative ri (9 legal ri), 111 ban

Government
  - Type: Gyeongju City

Area
  - Total: 44.83 km^{2} (17.31 sq mi)

Population (2007)
  - Total: 7,132
  - Density: 159/km^{2} (410/sq mi)
- Dialect: Gyeongsang dialect

Korean name
- Hangul: 감포읍
- Hanja: 甘浦邑
- RR: Gampo-eup
- MR: Kamp'o-ŭp

Gampo-eup (Korean: 감포읍) is an eup or a town of Gyeongju in South Korea. It contains part of Gyeongju National Park: the Daebon section which covers the shoreline near Daewangnueng, the watery grave of King Munmu of the Silla kingdom. 7,132 people live in Gampo-eup, served by two elementary schools and a joint middle-high school. Important local products include persimmons as well as anchovies, seaweed, and squid.

There are over 240 seafood restaurants in Gampo Harbor offering various dishes made with seafood caught in the sea, such as hoe (raw fish dishes), jeonboktang (an abalone soup), grilled seafood and others.

== See also ==
- Subdivisions of Gyeongju
- Administrative divisions of South Korea
