= Sinmun =

Sinmun may refer to:

== King ==
- Sinmun of Silla (r. 681–692), the thirty-first king of Silla, a Korean state that originated in the southwestern Korean peninsula

== Newspaper ==
- Gyeongju Sinmun, weekly newspaper published in the city of Gyeongju, North Gyeongsang province, South Korea
- Pyongyang Sinmun, North Korean newspaper founded on 1 June 1957 by Kim Il-sung
- Rodong Sinmun, North Korean newspaper and the official newspaper of the Central Committee of the Workers' Party of Korea
- Seoul Sinmun, daily newspaper based out of Seoul, South Korea
- Tongnip Sinmun (1896–1899), the first privately managed modern daily newspaper in Korea founded by Seo Jae-pil
