= Gyeongju Hyanggyo =

Pre-modern academy in Gyeongju, South Korea

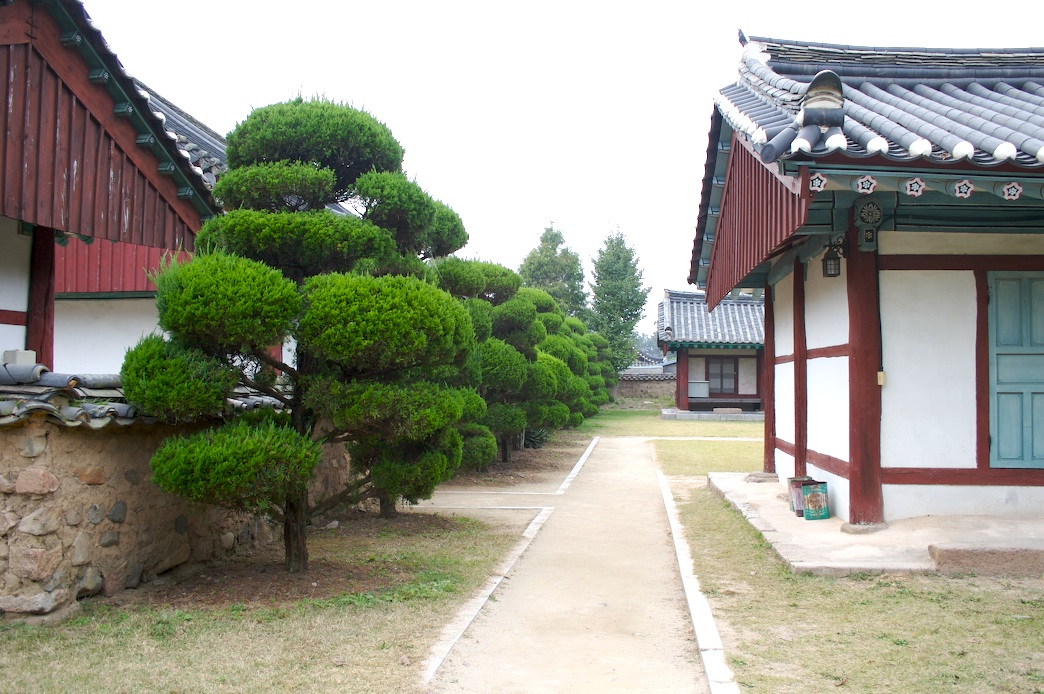

Korean name
- Hangul: 경주향교
- Hanja: 慶州鄕校
- RR: Gyeongju hyanggyo
- MR: Kyŏngju hyanggyo

The Gyeongju Hyanggyo is a hyanggyo or government-run provincial school during the Goryeo and Joseon periods, which is located in the neighborhood of Gyo-dong, Gyeongju, North Gyeongsang province, South Korea. The foundation date is unknown, but was established to enshrine the memorial tablet of a wise Confucian scholar and to commemorate him as well as to provide mid-leveled education to the local during the Goryeo period. The site was originally the place where the Gukhak, or national academy of the Silla kingdom was situated. The Gukhak was built in 682, the second year of King Sinmun's reign and is equivalent to current national universities. It is designated to the 191st Tangible Cultural Property of North Gyeongsang province.

== Gallery ==
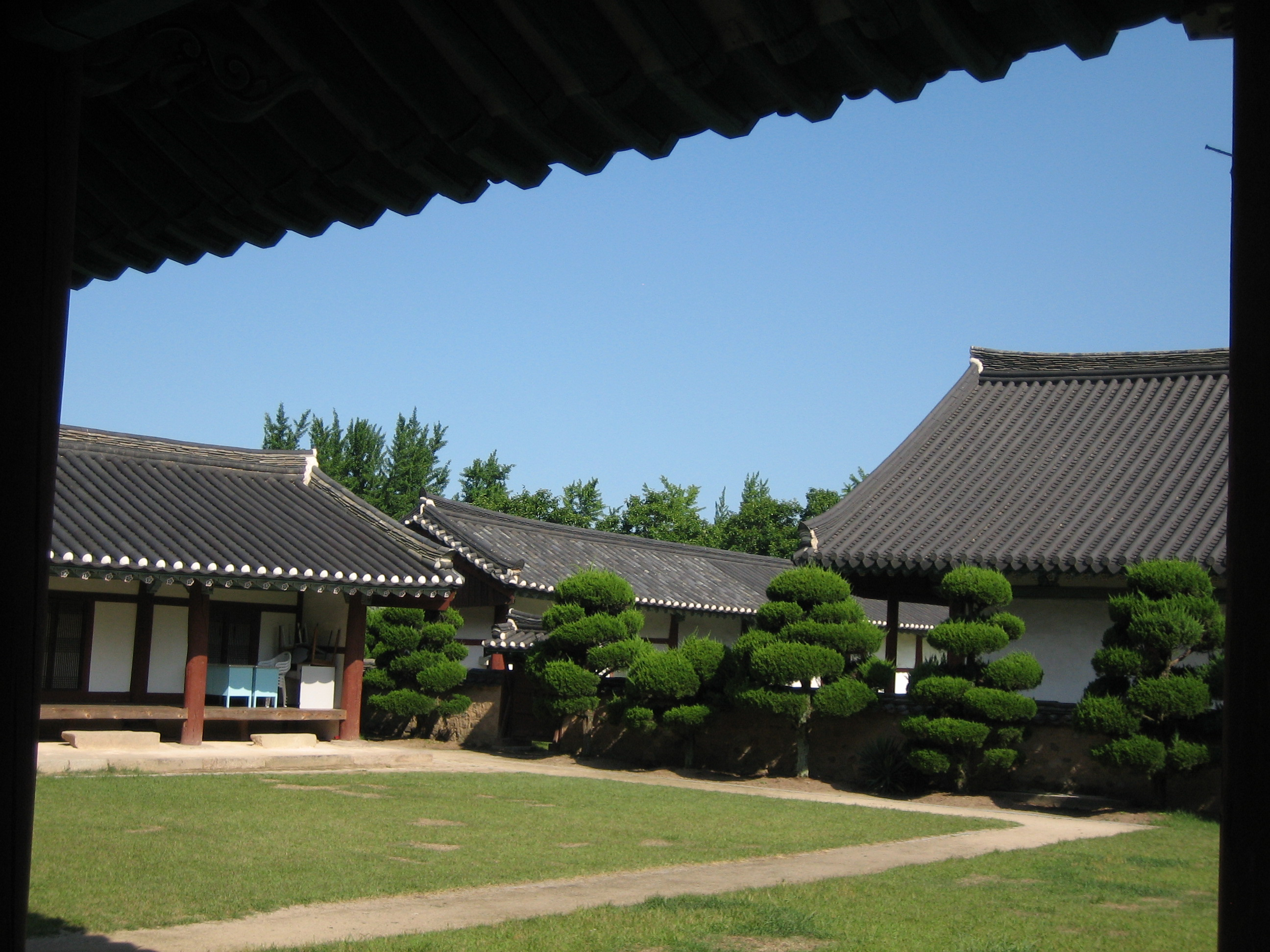

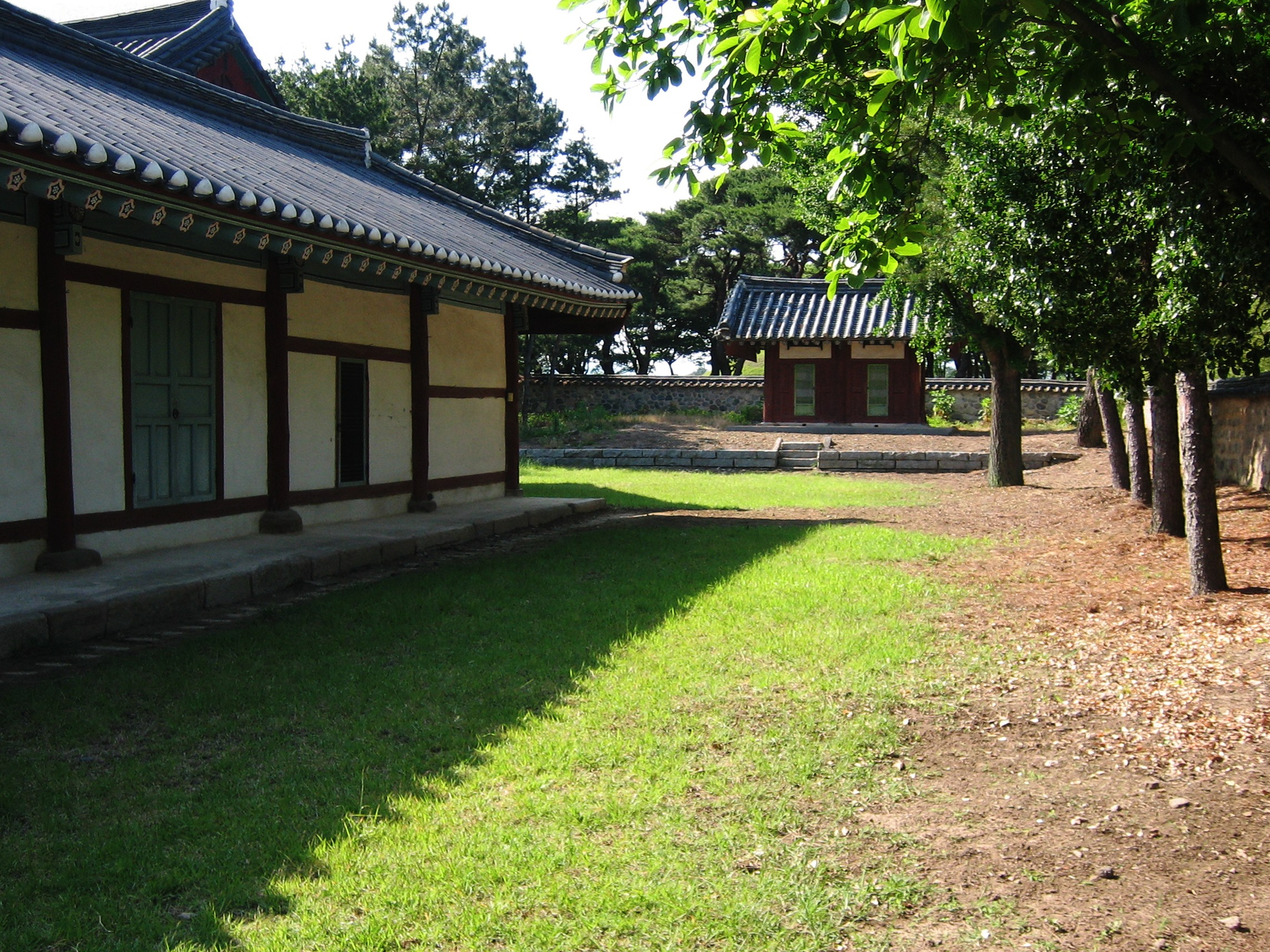

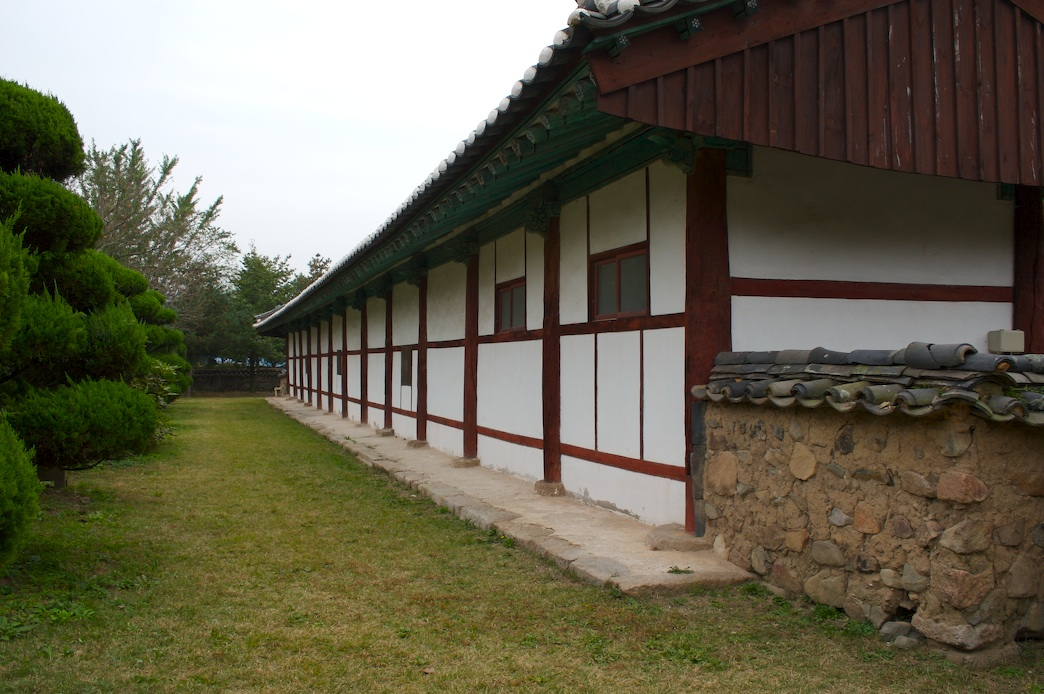

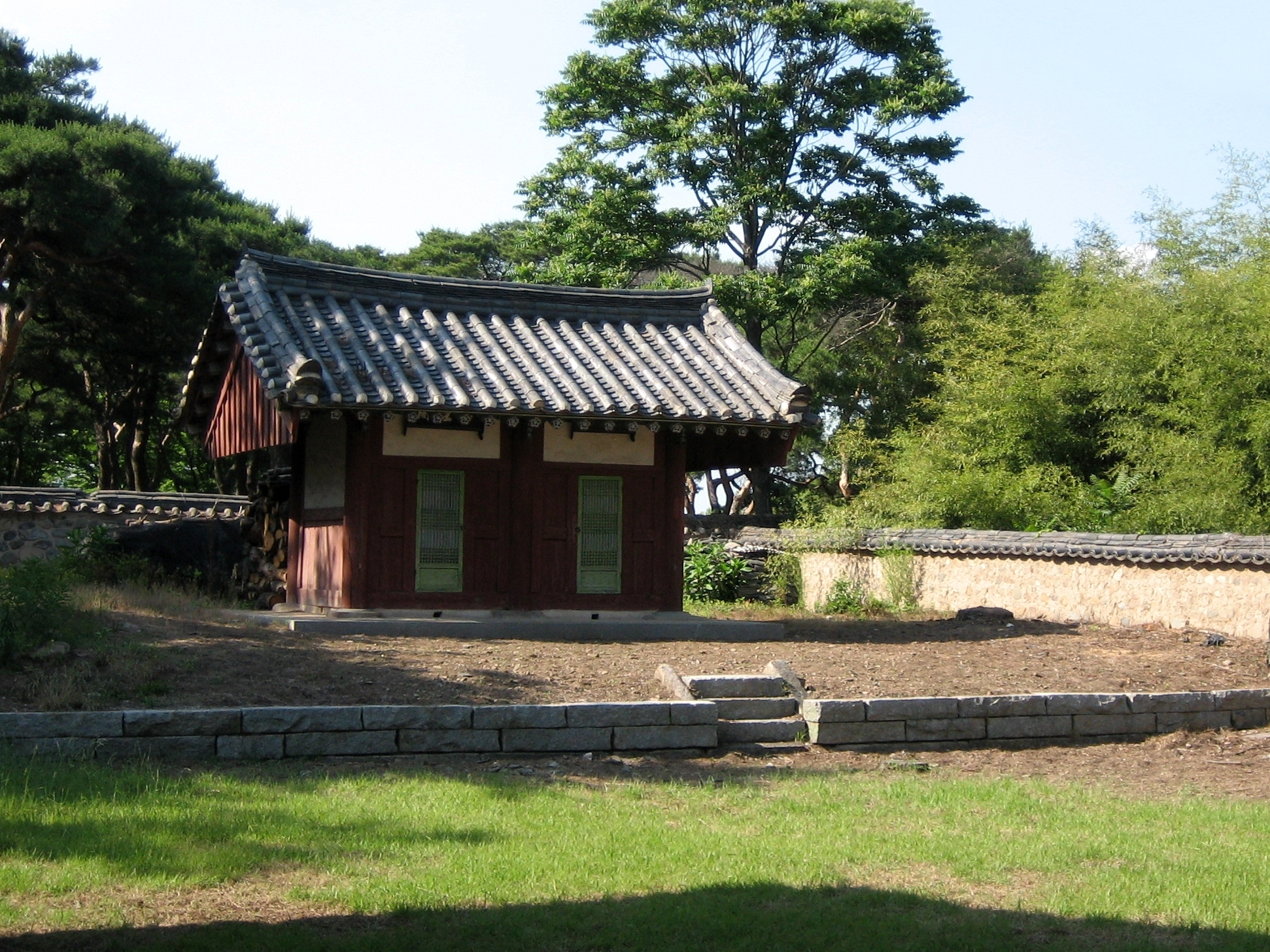

== See also ==
- Oksan Seowon, Gyeongju
- Korean Confucianism
