= Jusa Mountains =

Mountain range in South Korea

- Hangul: 주사산맥
- Hanja: 朱砂山脈
- RR: Jusasanmaek
- MR: Chusasanmaek

The Jusa Mountains are a minor range in southeastern South Korea. They run parallel to and immediately west of the Taebaek Mountains. Notable peaks include Danseok Mountain, which is part of Gyeongju National Park. The Jusa Mountains separate the Hyeongsan River basin on the east from the Geumho River basin on the west.

== See also ==
- Geography of South Korea
- Gyeongju
