= Gyeongju =

City in North Gyeongsang, South Korea

- Municipal City
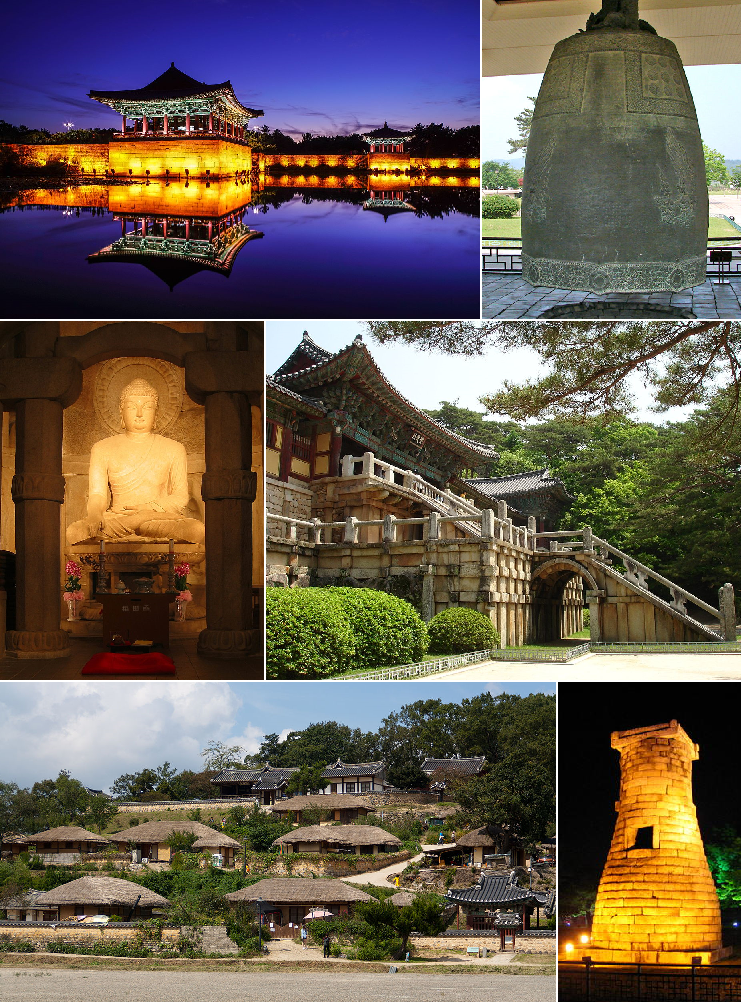
- Top left: Donggung Palace and Wolji Pond; Top right: Bell of King Seongdeok; middle left: Seokguram; middle right:Bulguksa temple; bottom left: Yangdong Folk Village; bottom right: Cheomseongdae.

- Flag Emblem of Gyeongju

- Location in South Korea
- Coordinates: 35°51′N 129°13′E
- Country: South Korea
- Region: North Gyeongsang Province
- Founded: 57 BC
- Administrative divisions: 4 eup, 8 myeon, 11 dong, 305 ri

Government
  - mayor: Ju Nak-young (주낙영)

Area
  - Total: 1,324.39 km^{2} (511.35 sq mi)

Population (September 2024)
  - Total: 245,365
  - Density: 212/km^{2} (550/sq mi)
  - Dialect: Gyeongsang
- Demonym: Gyeongjuite
- Time zone: UTC+9 (Korea Standard Time)
- Area code: +82-54
- Website: City of Gyeongju

Korean name
- Hangul: 경주시
- Hanja: 慶州市
- RR: Gyeongju-si
- MR: Kyŏngju-si

Gyeongju (Korean: 경주; pronounced [kjʌŋ.dʑu]), historically known as Sŏrabŏl (서라벌; pronounced [sʰʌ.ɾa.bʌɭ]), is a coastal city in the far southeastern corner of North Gyeongsang Province, South Korea. It is the second largest city by area in the province after Andong, covering 1,324 km^{2} (511 sq mi) with a population of 264,091 people as of December 2012. Gyeongju is 370 km (230 mi) southeast of Seoul, and 55 km (34 mi) east of Daegu. The city borders Cheongdo and Yeongcheon to the west, Ulsan to the south and Pohang to the north, while to the east lies the coast of the Sea of Japan. Numerous low mountains—outliers of the Taebaek range—are scattered around the city.

Gyeongju was the capital of the ancient kingdom of Silla (57 BC – 935 AD), which ruled about two-thirds of the Korean peninsula at its height between the 7th and 9th centuries, for close to one thousand years, where it was known as Sŏrabŏl. According to Samguk yusa, Sŏrabŏl had more than 170,000 households or between 800,000 and 900,000 inhabitants.

Later Silla was a prosperous and wealthy country, and Gyeongju was the fourth largest city in the world. A vast number of archaeological sites and cultural properties from this period remain in the city. Gyeongju is often referred to as "the museum without walls". Among such historical treasures, Seokguram grotto, Bulguksa temple, Gyeongju Historic Areas and Yangdong Folk Village are designated as World Heritage Sites by UNESCO. The many major historical sites have helped Gyeongju become one of the most popular tourist destinations in South Korea.

The city of Gyeongju was united with the nearby rural Gyeongju County in 1995 and is now an urban–rural complex. It is similar to 53 other small and medium-sized cities with a population under 300,000 people in South Korea. As well as its rich historical heritage, Gyeongju today is affected by the economic, demographic, and social trends that have shaped modern South Korean culture. Tourism remains the major economic driver, but manufacturing activities have developed due to its proximity to major industrial centers such as Ulsan and Pohang. Gyeongju is connected to the nationwide rail and highway networks, which facilitate industrial and tourist traffic.

== History ==
The early history of Gyeongju is closely tied to that of the Silla kingdom, of which it was the capital. Gyeongju first enters non-Korean records as Saro-guk, during the Samhan period. Korean records, probably based on the dynastic chronicles of Silla, record that Saro-guk was established in 57 BCE, when six small villages in the Gyeongju area united under Bak Hyeokgeose. As the kingdom expanded, it changed its name to Silla. During the Silla period, the city was called "Sŏrabŏl" (this toponym would eventually evolve into a Korean word for "capital city" as in Seoul), "Gyerim" (lit. Rooster's forest), or "Geumseong" (lit. City of Gold or Metal i.e. Impenetrable Fortress).

After the unification of the peninsula up to Taedong River in 668 AD, Gyeongju became the center of Korean political and cultural life. The city was home to the Silla court and the great majority of the kingdom's elite. Its prosperity became legendary, and was reported as far away as Persia according to the 9th century book The Book of Roads and Kingdoms. The historical text Samguk yusa give the city's population in its peak period as 178,936 households, suggesting that the total population was almost one million. Many of Gyeongju's most famous sites date from this Unified Silla period, which ended in the beginning of 10th century by Goryeo (918–1392).

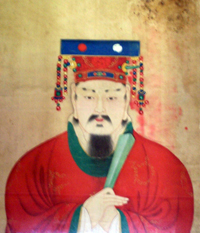
A portrait of the last king of Silla, King Gyeongsun (r. 927–935). After his surrender to King Taejo, Gyeongju lost its status as capital city.

In 940, the founder of Goryeo, King Taejo, changed the city's name to "Gyeongju", which literally means "Congratulatory district". In 987, as Goryeo introduced a system in which three additional capitals were established in politically important provinces outside Gaegyeong (nowadays Kaesong), and Gyeongju was designated as "Donggyeong" ("East Capital"). However, that title was removed in 1012, the third year of King Hyeongjong's reign, due to political rivalries at that time, though Gyeongju was later made the seat of Yeongnam Province. It had jurisdiction over a wide area, including much of central eastern Yeongnam, although this area was greatly reduced in the 13th century. Under the subsequent Joseon (1392–1910) dynasties, Gyeongju was no longer of national importance, but remained a regional center of influence. In 1601, the city ceased to be the provincial capital.

Over these centuries, the city suffered numerous assaults. In the 13th century, Mongol forces destroyed a nine-story wooden pagoda at Hwangnyongsa. During the Japanese invasions of Korea, the Gyeongju area became a heated battlefield, and Japanese forces burned the wooden structures at Bulguksa. Not all damage was due to invasions, however. In the early Joseon period, a great deal of damage was done to Buddhist sculptures on Namsan by Neo-Confucian radicals, who hacked arms and heads off statuary.

In the 20th century, the city remained relatively small, no longer ranking among the major cities of Korea. During the early 20th century, many archaeological excavations were conducted, particularly inside the tombs which had remained largely intact over the centuries. A museum, the forerunner of the present-day Gyeongju National Museum, was inaugurated in 1915 to exhibit the excavated artifacts.

Gyeongju emerged as a railroad junction in the later years of the Japanese occupation, as the Donghae Nambu Line and Jungang line were established in preparation for the Second Sino-Japanese War and to exploit the rich resources of the eastern part of the Korean peninsula. Following liberation in 1945, Korea was plunged into turmoil, and Gyeongju was no exception. Returnees from abroad were numerous; a village for them was constructed in present-day Dongcheon-dong. In a period marked by widespread conflict and unrest, the Gyeongju area became particularly notorious for the level of guerrilla activity in the mountains.

Despite the outbreak of the Korean War in 1950, most of Gyeongju was spared from the fighting, and remained under South Korean control throughout the conflict. However, for a brief time in late 1950 portions of the city stood on the front lines, as North Korean forces pushed the Pusan Perimeter southward from Pohang.

In the 1970s, Korea saw substantial industrial development, much of it centered in the Yeongnam region of which Gyeongju is a part. The POSCO steel mill in neighboring Pohang commenced operations in 1973, and the chemical manufacturing complex in Ulsan emerged in the same year. These developments helped to support the emergence of Gyeongju's manufacturing sector.

== Geography and climate ==
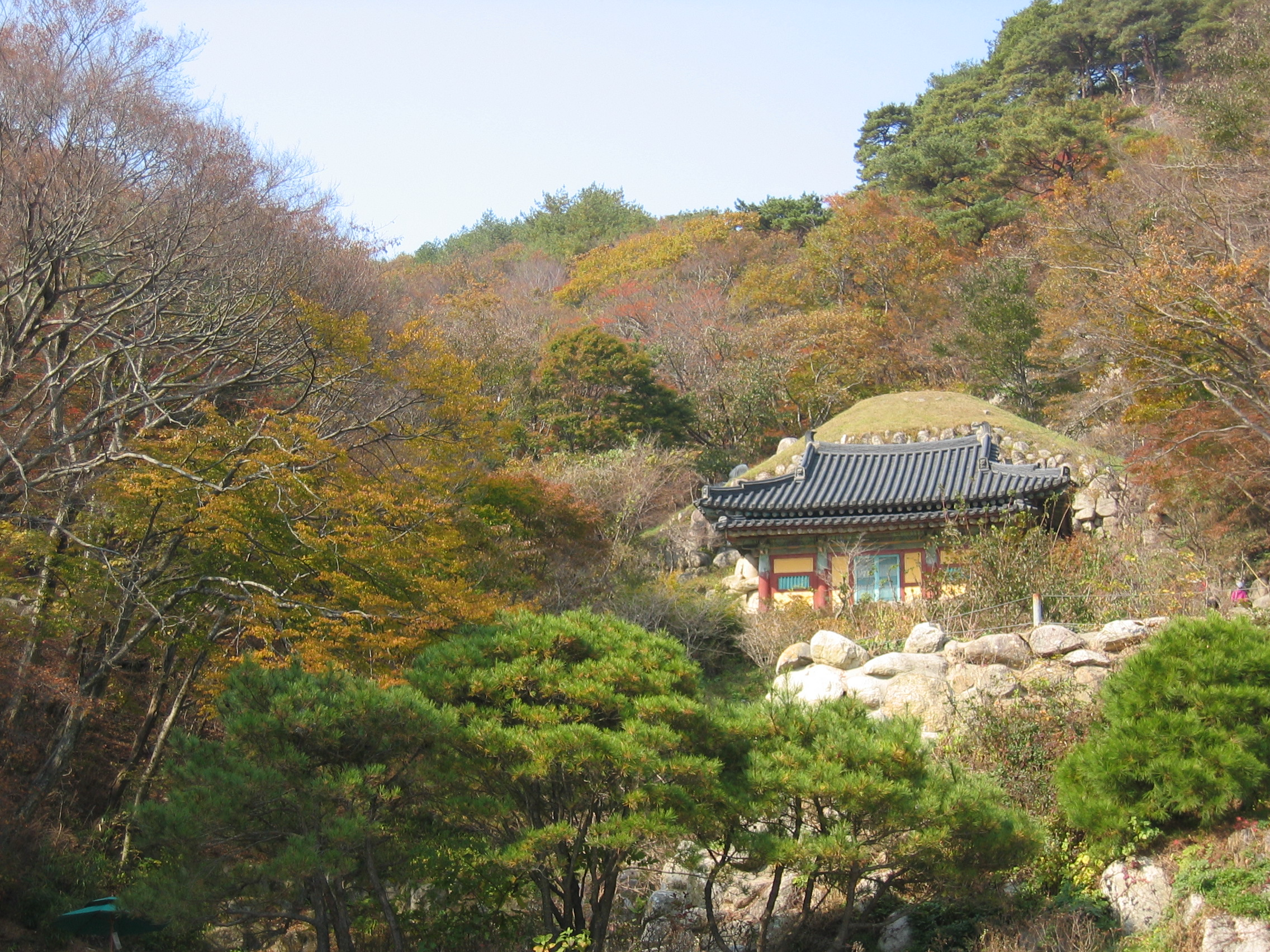
Seokguram grotto on the slopes of Tohamsan

Gyeongju lies in the southeastern corner of North Gyeongsang Province, and is bounded by the metropolitan city of Ulsan on the south. Within the province, its neighbors include Pohang on the north, Cheongdo County on the southwest, and Yeongcheon on the northwest. Gyeongju is located about 50 kilometers (31 mi) north of Busan. To the east, it has no neighbor but the sea.

Most of Gyeongju lies in the Gyeongsang Basin, but a few areas of the city belong to the Pohang Basin, such as Eoil-ri and Beomgok-ri in Yangbuk-myeon, and part of Cheonbuk-myeon. The Gyeongsang Basin areas consist of Bulguksa intrusive rock penetrating layers of sedimentary rocks, mainly granite and porphyry. By contrast, the Pohang Basin areas are made up of stratum that formed in the Tertiary period of the Cenozoic era, which consists of igneous rock, aqueous rock, porphyry, sandstone, and tuff.

Low mountains are widespread throughout Gyeongju. The highest of these are the Taebaek Mountains, which run along the city's western border. Gyeongju's highest point, Munboksan (문복산), is 1,015 meters (3,330 ft) above sea level. This peak lies in Sannae-myeon, on the border with Cheongdo. East of the Taebaek range, other western peaks such as Danseok Mountain lie within the Jusa subrange. The city's eastern peaks, including Tohamsan, belong to the Haean Mountains and Dongdae Mountains.

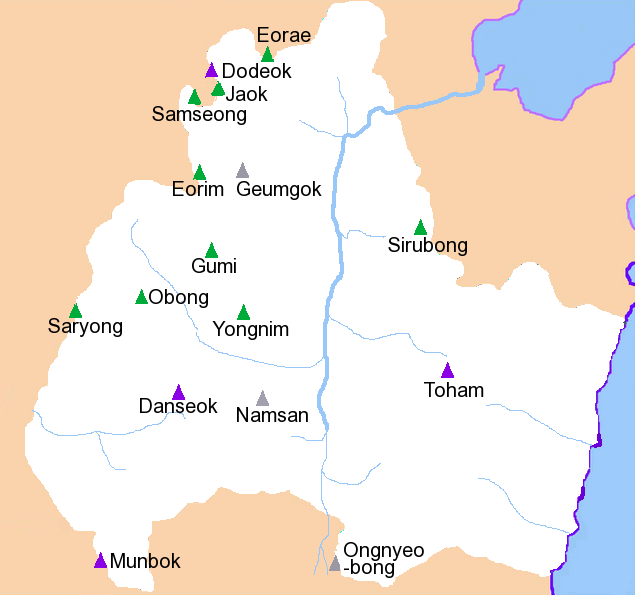
Principal mountains and drainage patterns of Gyeongju. Mountains of 500 to 700 m (1,600 to 2,300 ft) are in green, those taller than 700 m (2,300 ft) in violet. The rest three in gray are under 500 m (1,600 ft).

Gyeongju's drainage patterns are shaped by these lines of mountains. The Dongdae Mountains divide a narrow foothills area on their east, and various internal river systems to the west. Most of the city's interior is drained by the small Hyeongsan River, which flows north from Ulsan and meets the sea at Pohang Harbor. The Hyeongsan's chief tributaries include the Bukcheon and Namcheon, which join it in Gyeongju Basin. The southwestern corner of Gyeongju, on the far side of the Taebaek range, drains into the Geumho River, which then flows into the Nakdong. A small area of the south, just west of the Dongdae range, drains into the Taehwa River, which flows into the Bay of Ulsan.

The Gyeongju coastline runs for 36.1 kilometers (22.4 mi) between Pohang in the north and Ulsan in the south. There are no islands or large bays, only the small indentations made by the small streams flowing off the Dongdae ridgeline. Because of this, the city has no significant ports, though there are 12 small harbors. One such harbor in Gyeongju's southeast corner is home to the Ulsan base of the National Maritime Police. This base is responsible for security over a wide area of South Korea's east-central coast. The coastline of Gyeongju is also notable for its well-developed marine terraces, which provide important evidence of tectonic uplift and sea-level changes during the Quaternary period. These landforms, particularly around the Yangnam area, serve as a significant geological resource for studying the paleogeography of the East Sea coast.

=== Climate ===
Gyeongju has a cooler version of a humid subtropical climate (Köppen: Cfa), closely bordering a hot-summer humid continental climate Köppen: Dfa) using the 0°C isotherm. Due to its coastal location, Gyeongju has a slightly milder climate than the more inland regions of Korea. In general, however, the city's climate is typical of South Korea. It has hot summers and cool winters, with a monsoon season between late June and early August. As on the rest of Korea's east coast, autumn typhoons are not uncommon. The average annual rainfall is 1,091 millimeters (43.0 in), and the average annual high temperatures range from 8.6–31.1 °C (47–88 °F).

Gyeongju's historic city center lies on the banks of the Hyeongsan in Gyeongju Basin. This low-lying area has been subject to repeated flooding throughout recorded history, often as a result of typhoons. On average, chronicles report a major flood every 27.9 years, beginning in the 1st century. Modern flood control mechanisms brought about a dramatic reduction in flooding in the later 20th century. The last major flood occurred in 1991, when the Deokdong Lake reservoir overflowed due to Typhoon Gladys.

Climate data for Gyeongju (2011–2020 normals, extremes 2010–present)
Month	Jan	Feb	Mar	Apr	May	Jun	Jul	Aug	Sep	Oct	Nov	Dec	Year
Record high °C (°F)	16.8 (62.2)	24.2 (75.6)	26.6 (79.9)	32.5 (90.5)	36.2 (97.2)	36.5 (97.7)	39.7 (103.5)	39.8 (103.6)	35.1 (95.2)	31.5 (88.7)	29.4 (84.9)	19.3 (66.7)	39.8 (103.6)
Mean daily maximum °C (°F)	5.9 (42.6)	8.4 (47.1)	14.4 (57.9)	19.7 (67.5)	25.7 (78.3)	27.7 (81.9)	30.6 (87.1)	31.4 (88.5)	26.2 (79.2)	21.6 (70.9)	15.3 (59.5)	7.7 (45.9)	19.6 (67.3)
Daily mean °C (°F)	0.3 (32.5)	2.3 (36.1)	7.4 (45.3)	12.7 (54.9)	18.4 (65.1)	21.9 (71.4)	25.4 (77.7)	25.9 (78.6)	20.5 (68.9)	14.8 (58.6)	8.7 (47.7)	1.9 (35.4)	13.4 (56.1)
Mean daily minimum °C (°F)	−4.7 (23.5)	−3.1 (26.4)	1.0 (33.8)	6.0 (42.8)	11.7 (53.1)	17.0 (62.6)	21.4 (70.5)	21.9 (71.4)	16.2 (61.2)	9.3 (48.7)	3.0 (37.4)	−3.2 (26.2)	8.0 (46.4)
Record low °C (°F)	−14.7 (5.5)	−13.4 (7.9)	−6.6 (20.1)	−3.0 (26.6)	1.9 (35.4)	10.2 (50.4)	14.9 (58.8)	14.0 (57.2)	7.0 (44.6)	−0.6 (30.9)	−6.6 (20.1)	−11.7 (10.9)	−14.7 (5.5)
Average precipitation mm (inches)	32.2 (1.27)	30.8 (1.21)	59.7 (2.35)	96.1 (3.78)	55.3 (2.18)	100.6 (3.96)	190.1 (7.48)	191.9 (7.56)	194.1 (7.64)	108.2 (4.26)	37.8 (1.49)	24.4 (0.96)	1,121.2 (44.14)
Average precipitation days (≥ 0.1 mm)	5.1	6.8	7.6	9.8	7.7	9.6	12.8	13.7	12.2	6.7	6.8	5.4	104.2
Average relative humidity (%)	52.6	56.7	58.3	60.3	63.5	72.6	78.4	79.8	81.3	75.1	67.5	56.3	66.9
Mean monthly sunshine hours	197.2	179.1	226.7	218.8	240.0	182.1	162.9	180.9	147.5	178.5	161.8	186.2	2,261.7
Source: Korea Meteorological Administration

== Government ==
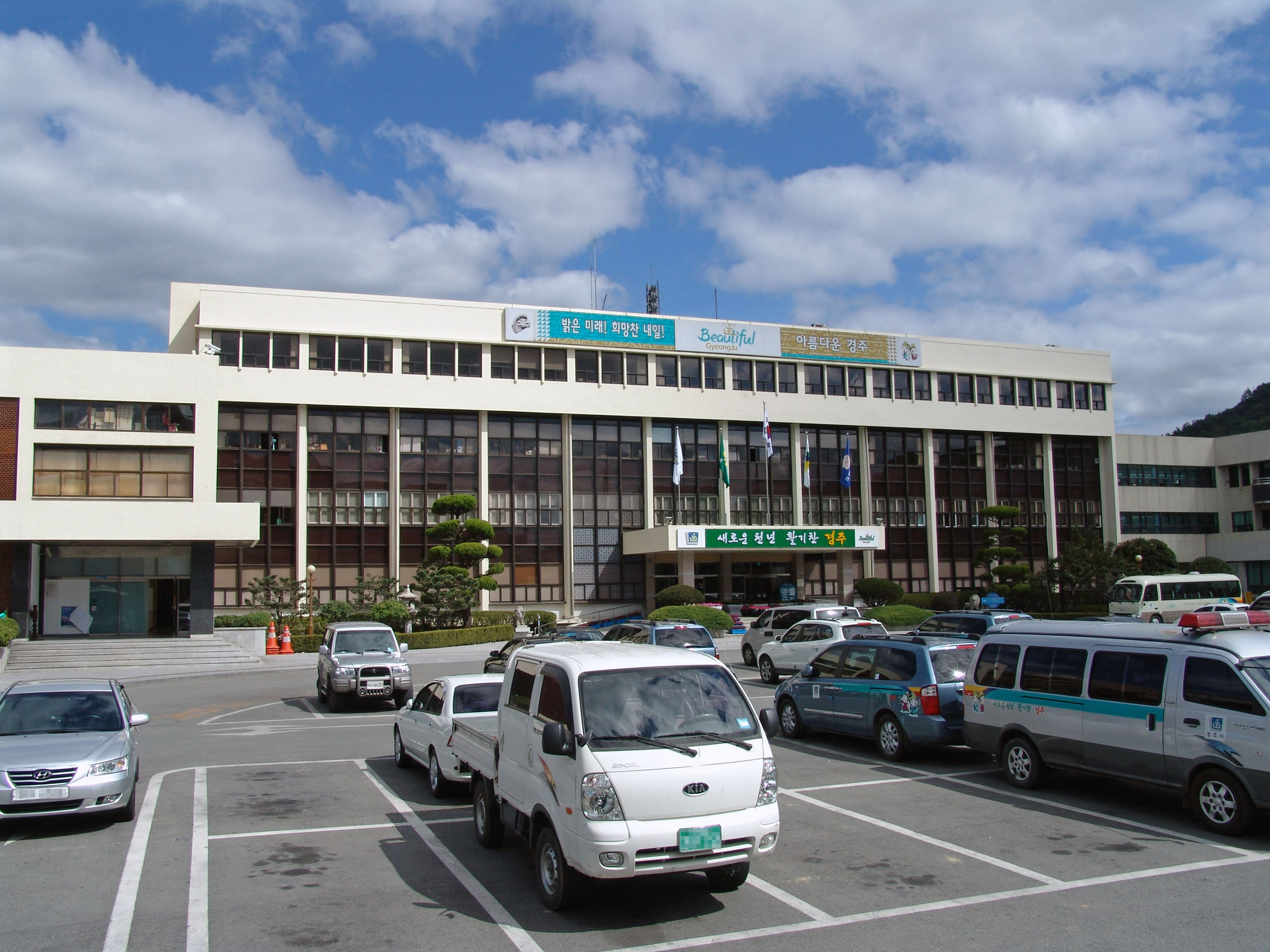
Gyeongju City Hall in Dongcheon-dong

The executive branch of the government is headed by a mayor and vice-mayor. As in other South Korean cities and counties, the mayor is elected directly, while the vice-mayor is appointed. As of 2019, the mayor is Joo Nak-young, who was elected on 13 June 2018, in the local elections. He is Gyeongju's fifth mayor to be directly elected, the sixth to preside over the city in its present form, and the 31st mayor since 1955. Like most heads of government in the Yeongnam region, he is a member of the conservative Liberty Korea Party.

The legislative branch consists of the Gyeongju City Council, with 21 members as of 2009. The present City Council was formed from the merger of the old Gyeongju City Council with the Wolseong County Council in 1991. Most subdivisions of Gyeongju elect a single member to represent them in the council, but Angang-eup is represented by two members because of its large population, and two of the representatives serve combined districts composed of two dong. Like the mayor, the council members were last elected in 2006, except for a small number elected in more recent by-elections.

The central administration is composed of a City Council committee, five departments, two subsidiary organs, a chamber (the auditor), and six business offices. The five departments are the Departments of Planning and Culture, Autonomous Administration, Industry and Environment, Construction and Public Works, and the National Enterprise Committee; these oversee a total of 29 subdivisions. The two subsidiary organs are the Health Care Center and Agro-technology Center; these belong directly to the central administration and have a total of 4 subdivisions. In addition, there are 23 local administrative subdivisions. Each of these subdivisions has a local office with a small administrative staff. As of December 2008, the city government employed 1,462 people.

== Subdivisions ==
The city is divided into 23 administrative districts: 4 eup, 8 myeon, and 11 dong. These are the standard subdivisions of cities and counties in South Korea. The dong or neighborhood units occupy the area of the city center, which was formerly occupied by Gyeongju-eup. Eup are typically substantial villages, whereas myeon are more rural.

The city's boundaries and designation changed several times in the 20th century. From 1895 to 1955, the area was known as Gyeongju-gun ("Gyeongju County"). In the first decades of the century, the city center was known as Gyeongju-myeon, signifying a relatively rural rea. In 1931, the downtown area was designated Gyeongju-eup, in recognition of its increasingly urban nature. In 1955, Gyeongju-eup became Gyeongju-si ("Gyeongju City"), the same name as today, but with a much smaller area. The remainder of Gyeongju-gun became "Wolseong County." The county and city were reunited in 1995, creating Gyeongju City as it is today.

Map of Gyeongju
Map of the coastal district previously mentioned. Its center, covering about a sixth of the area, is divided into 11 subdivisions. The surrounding regions are divided into eight subdivisions in a different color. The rest, four subdivisions in a third color, are scattered to the northeast, west, southeast and east respectively.
#	Place	Population (2007)	Households	Area (km^{2})	#	Place	Population	Households	Area (km^{2})
1	Sannae-myeon	3,561	1,779	142.6	13	Seondo-dong	13,813	2,831	28.0
2	Seo-myeon	4,773	1,779	52.1	14	Seonggeon-dong	18,378	7,562	6.4
3	Hyeongok-myeon	16,829	5,726	55.7	15	Hwangseong-dong	29,660	9,415	3.8
4	Angang-eup	33,802	12,641	138.6	16	Yonggang-dong	15,959	5,244	5.1
5	Gangdong-myeon	8,834	3,659	81.4	17	Bodeok-dong	2,296	977	81.0
6	Cheonbuk-myeon	6,185	2,328	58.2	18	Bulguk-dong	9,001	3,722	37.4
7	Munmudaewang-myeon	4,535	2,026	120.1	19	Hwangnam-dong*	8,885	3,875	20.5
8	Gampo-eup	7,099	3,084	44.9	20	Jungbu-dong	7,003	3,022	0.9
9	Yangnam-myeon	7,131	2,941	85.1	21	Hwango-dong*	10,225	4283	1.5
10	Oedong-eup	19,006	6,965	109.8	22	Dongcheon-dong	26,721	9,228	5.3
11	Naenam-myeon	6,142	2,526	122.1	23	Wolseong-dong	6,522	4,842	31.4
12	Geoncheon-eup	11,217	4,533	92.4					

Eup / Myeon / Dong	*Figures based on resident registration figures made available by local government offices. For more detailed source information, see Subdivisions of Gyeongju.

== Demographics ==
When the Silla kingdom reached the peak of its development, Gyeongju was estimated to have a million residents, four times the city's population in 2008. In recent years, Gyeongju has followed the same trends that have affected the rest of South Korea. Like the country as a whole, Gyeongju has seen its population age and the size of families shrink. For instance, the mean household size is 2.8 people. Because this has fallen in recent years, there are more households in the city as of 2008 (105,009) than there were in 2003, even though the population has fallen.

Like most of South Korea's smaller cities, Gyeongju has seen a steady drop in population in recent years. From 2002 to 2008, the city lost 16,557 people. This is primarily due to the migration of workers seeking employment in the major South Korean cities. In 2007, about 1,975 more people moved away from the city each year than moved in. During the same period, births exceeded deaths by roughly 450 per year, a significant number but not enough to offset the losses due to migration.

Gyeongju has a small but growing population of non-Koreans. In 2007, there were 4,671 foreigners living in the city. This number corresponds to 1.73% of the total population, more than double the figure from 2003. The growth was largely in immigrants from other Asian countries, many of whom were employed in the automotive parts industry. Countries of origin whose numbers have risen include the Philippines, China, Taiwan, Indonesia, and Vietnam. The number of residents from Japan, the United States, and Canada fell significantly in the 2003–2007 period.

=== Dialect ===
The city has a distinctive dialect which it shares with northern portions of Ulsan. This dialect is similar to the general Gyeongsang dialect, but retains distinctive features of its own. Some linguists have treated the distinctive characteristics of the Gyeongju dialect as vestiges of the Silla language. For instance, the contrast between the local dialect form "소내기" (sonaegi) and the standard "소나기" (sonagi, meaning "rainshower") has been seen as reflecting the ancient phonemic character of the Silla language.

== Culture and people ==
=== Cultural properties ===
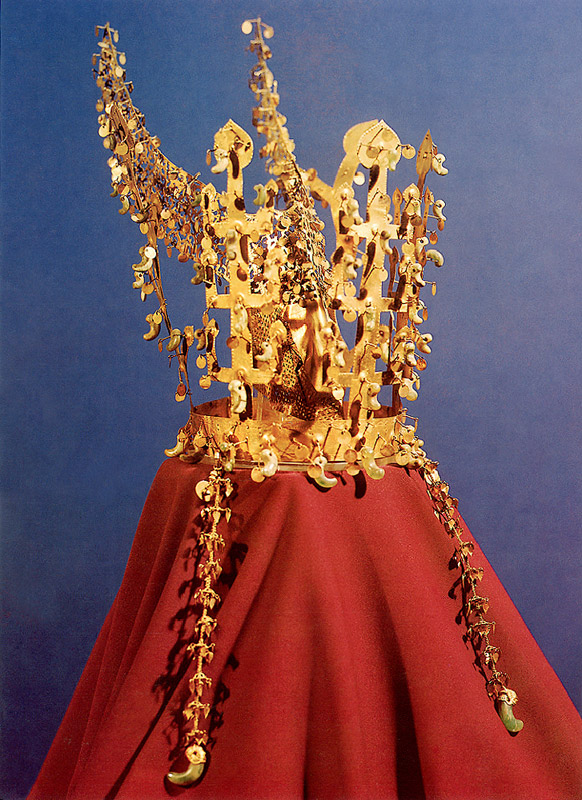
A gold crown excavated from Gold Crown Tomb. National Treasures of South Korea No. 87.

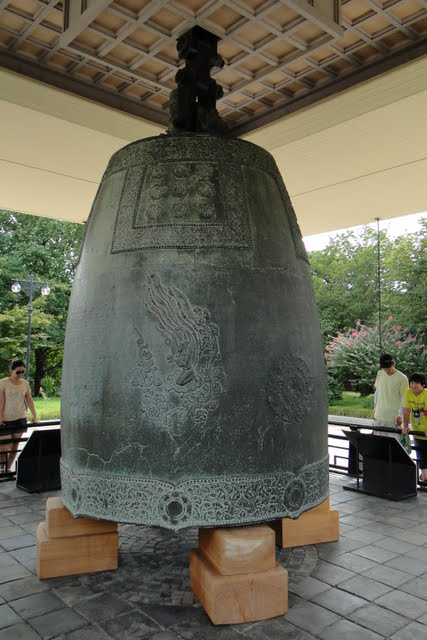
Divine Bell of King Seongdeok

Gyeongju is the main destination in South Korea for visitors interested in the cultural heritage of Silla and the architecture of Joseon. The city has 31 National Treasures, and Gyeongju National Museum houses 16,333 artifacts. There are four broad categories of relics and historical sites: tumuli and their artifacts; Buddhist sites and objects; fortresses and palace sites; and ancient architecture. Prehistoric remains including Mumun pottery have been excavated in central Gyeongju, in the Moa-ri and Oya-ri villages of the Cheonbuk-myeon district, and in the Jukdong-ri village of the Oedong district. Dolmens are found in several places, especially in Gangdong-myeon and Moa-ri. Bronze Age relics found in Angye-ri village of Gangdong-myeon, Jukdong-ri and Ipsil-ri villages of Oedong-eup and graveyards in the Joyang-dong district represent the Samhan confederacy period of around the 1st century BC to the 3rd century AD.

There are 35 royal tombs and 155 tumuli in central Gyeongju, and 421 tumuli in the outskirts of the city. Silla burial mounds built after the period of the Three Kingdoms are found in central Gyeongju, including tumuli in the districts of Noseo-dong, Nodong-dong, Hwangnam-dong, Hwango-dong and Inwang-dong. Western Gyeongju has the tomb of King Muyeol in Seoak-dong, nearby tumuli in Chunghyo-dong and the tomb of Kim Yu-sin. The tombs of Queen Seondeok, King Sinmun, King Hyogong and King Sinmu are at the base of Namsan mountain while the tombs of King Heongang, King Jeonggang, King Gyeongmyeong and King Gyeongae are on the slopes of the mountain. In addition to the tombs, tumuli have been found surrounding Namsan mountain and in the western part of Geumgang mountain. Artifacts excavated from the tombs of Geumgwanchong (gold crown tomb), Seobongchong (western phoenix tomb), Cheonmachong (heavenly horse tomb) and northern and southern parts of Tomb No. 98 are good examples of Silla culture.

=== Notable people ===
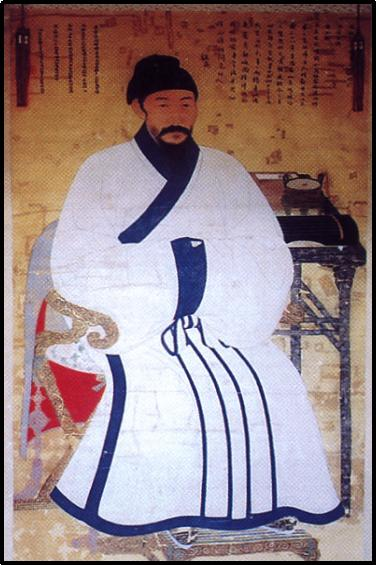
Yi Che-hyŏn (1287–1367)

Gyeongju has produced notable individuals throughout its history. As the capital of Silla, Gyeongju was a center of culture in its heyday. Notable Gyeongju residents in the Silla period included most of the kingdom's leading figures, not only rulers but scholars such as Seol Chong and Ch'oe Ch'i-wŏn, and generals like Kim Yu-sin, the leader of the Hwarang warriors. The city continued to contribute to traditional Korean thought in subsequent dynasties. Relatives of Ch'oe Ch'i-wŏn such as Ch'oe Ŏn-wi and Ch'oe Hang played an important role in establishing the structures of early Goryeo. In the Joseon period, Gyeongju joined the rest of Gyeongsang in becoming a hotbed of the conservative Sarim faction. Notable Gyeongju members of this faction included the 15th-century intellectual Yi Ŏnjŏk. He has been enshrined in the Oksan Seowon since 1572. In modern times, the city produced writers such as Kim Dongni and Pak Mok-wol, both of whom did a great deal to popularize the region's culture, as well as Choe Jun, a wealthy businessman who established the Yeungnam University Foundation.

Some Korean family clans trace their origins to Gyeongju, often to the ruling elites of Silla. For example, the Gyeongju Kim clan claims descent from the rulers of later Silla. The Gyeongju Park clan and Gyeongju Seok clans trace their ancestry to Silla's earlier ruling families. These three royal clans played a strong role in preserving the historical precincts of Gyeongju into modern times. The Gyeongju Choi and Gyeongju Lee clans also trace their ancestry to the Silla elites. Prominent members of the Gyeongju Lee clan include Goryeo period scholar Yi Che-hyŏn, and Joseon period scholars Yi Hwang and Yi Hang-bok. A contemporary notable figure from the Gyeongju Lee clan is Lee Byung-chul, the founder of Samsung Group. However, not all Gyeongju clans date to the Silla period; for instance, the Gyeongju Bing clan was founded in the early Joseon period.

=== Religion ===
The city remains an important centre of Korean Buddhism. East of the downtown area lies Bulguksa, one of South Korea's largest Buddhist temples; nearby is Seokguram, a famed Buddhist shrine. Traditional prayer locations are found on mountains throughout Gyeongju. Such mountains include Namsan near the city center, Danseok-san and Obong-san in the west, and the low peak of Hyeong-san on the Gyeongju-Pohang border. Namsan in particular is often referred to as "the sacred mountain" due to the Buddhist shrines and statues which cover its slopes. In addition, Gyeongju is the birthplace of Cheondoism, an indigenous religion to Korea based on Korean shamanism, Taoism and Korean Buddhism, with elements drawn from Christianity. The religion evolved from Donghak (lit. East learning) disciplines established by Choe Je-u. His birthplace of Yongdamjeong, located in Hyeongok-myeon, is regarded as a sacred place to followers of Cheondogyo.

=== Cuisine ===
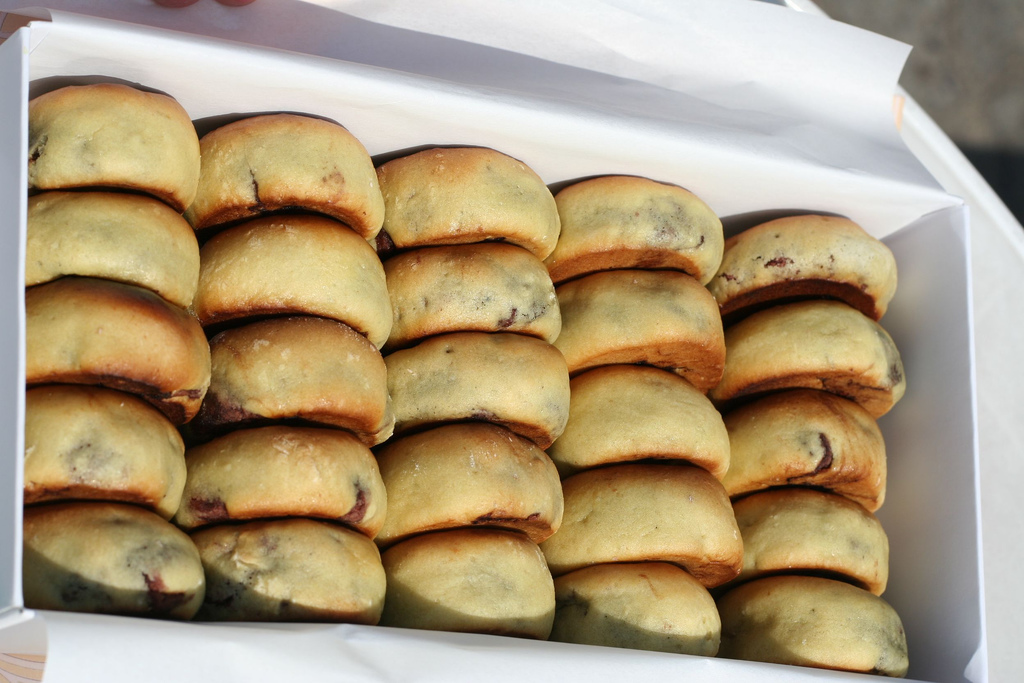
Gyeongju bread, a local speciality

The cuisine of Gyeongju is generally similar to other areas of Gyeongsang Province: spicy and salty. However, it has distinctive tastes according to region and several local specialties known nationwide. The most famous of these is "Gyeongju bread" or "Hwangnam bread", a red-bean pastry first baked in 1939 and now sold throughout the country. Chalboribbang, made with locally produced glutinous barley, is also a pastry with a filling of red bean paste. Local specialties with a somewhat longer pedigree include beopju, a traditional Korean liquor produced by the Gyeongju Choe in Gyo-dong. The brewing skill and distill master were designated as Important Intangible Cultural Properties by South Korea government.

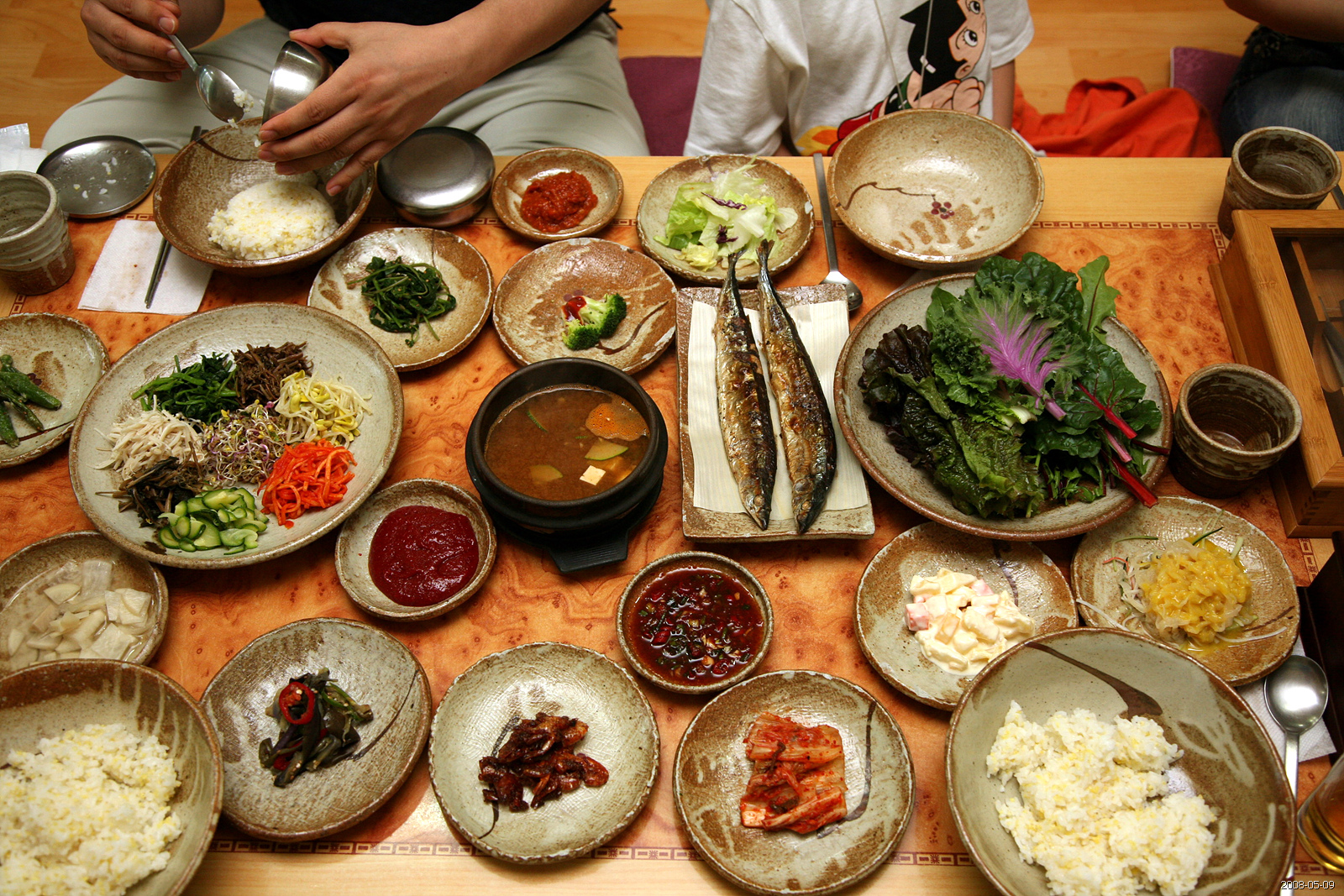
Ssambap, a rice dish served with vegetable leaves, various small side dishes and condiments

Other local specialties include ssambap, haejangguk, and muk. Ssambap refers to a rice dish served with vegetable leaves, various banchan (small side dishes) and condiments such as gochujang (chili pepper paste) or ssamjang (a mixture of soybean paste and gochujang) to wrap them together. Most ssambap restaurants in Gyeongju are gathered in the area of Daenuengwon or Grand Tumuli Park. Haejangguk is a kind of soup eaten as a hangover cure, and means "soup to chase a hangover". A street dedicated to haejangguk is located near Gyeongju National Museum, where 20 haejangguk restaurants are gathered to serve the Gyeongju-style haejangguk. The soup is made by boiling soybean sprout, sliced memilmuk (buckwheat starch jelly), sour kimchi (pickled vegetables) and gulfweed in a clear broth of dried anchovy and Alaska pollack.

The east district of Gyeongju, Gampo-eup town, is adjacent to the sea, so fresh seafood and jeotgal (fermented salted seafood) are abundant. There are over 240 seafood restaurants in Gampo Harbor offering various dishes made with seafood caught in the sea, such as hoe (raw fish dishes), jeonboktang (an abalone soup), grilled seafood and others.

== Sports ==
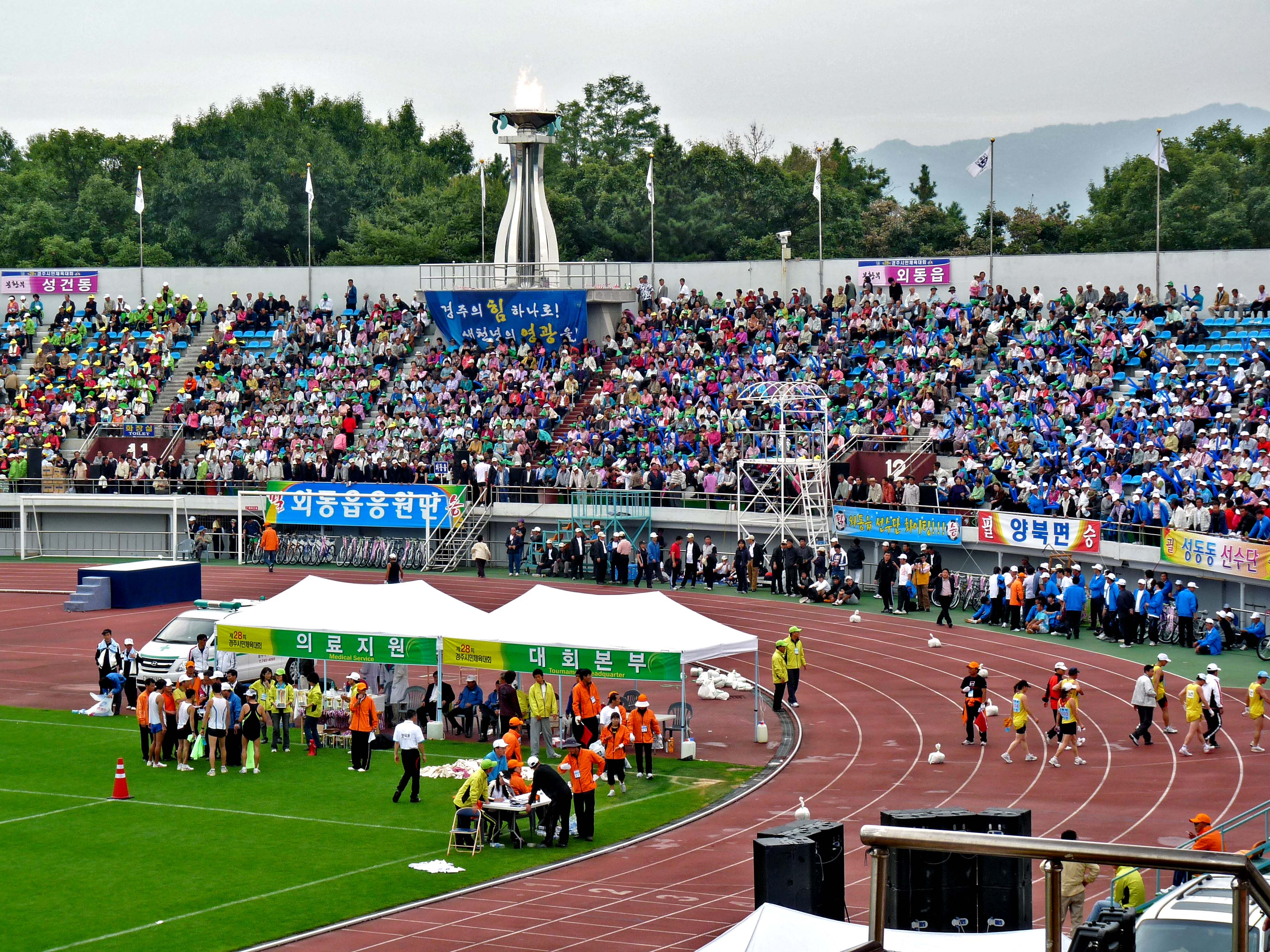
2008 Gyeongju Citizens' Athletics Festival held at Gyeongju Public Stadium

As of 2007, Gyeongju had two stadiums, two gymnasiums, two tennis courts, one swimming pool and others as public sport facilities as well as various registered private sports venues. Many of public sport facilities are located in Hwangseong Park with an area of 1,022,350 m^{2} (11,004,500 sq ft) including a luxuriant pine trees forest. The site was originally the location of the artificial forest of Doksan which was established for feng shui purposes during the Silla period. It was also used as a training ground for hwarang warriors and hunting spot for Silla kings, and was reported to be King Jinpyeong's favorite location. In 1975, Hwangseong Park was designated a "city neighborhood park" and it currently consists of the multi-purpose Gyeongju Public Stadium, Football Park (with seven football fields and one futsal field), and one gymnasium, as well as Horimjang field for gukgung or Korean traditional archery and a ssireum wrestling ring. In addition, it contains a gateball field, an inline skating rink, jogging courses, and cycling roads. The Gyeongju Public Stadium was completed in 1982 and can accommodate 20,000 people at capacity.

In 2013, Korea Hydro & Nuclear Power FC relocated from Daejeon to Gyeongju, playing home matches at Gyeongju Civic Stadium. In 2017, the club established a women's team to compete in the WK League, using Pitch 3 of Gyeongju Football Park as their home ground.

Angang Field Hockey Stadium, located in the district of Angang-eup, is home to Gyeongju City Hockey, which is one of four professional women's field hockey teams in South Korea. The team was formed in 1994, and is governed by the Sport and Youth Division of Gyeongju City. Although not an initial successful team, Gyeongju City Hockey won the first trophies both at National Division Hockey Championships and National Sports Festival in 2000. In 2002, Gyeongju City Hockey took first prize and three second prizes, and in 2008, the team won the first prize at the 51st National Division Hockey Championships.

The city plays host to two annual marathon events. The Gyeongju International Marathon, held in October, garners elite level competition while the larger Gyeongju Cherry Blossom Marathon caters more for amateur fun runners. The Cherry Blossom Marathon has been held each year in Gyeongju since 1992, usually in April, to improve relations with Japan (a country with a long history of marathon running). The race, mainly sponsored by Gyeongju and the district, attracted 13,600 participants in 2009 including about 1,600 foreigners.

== Economy ==
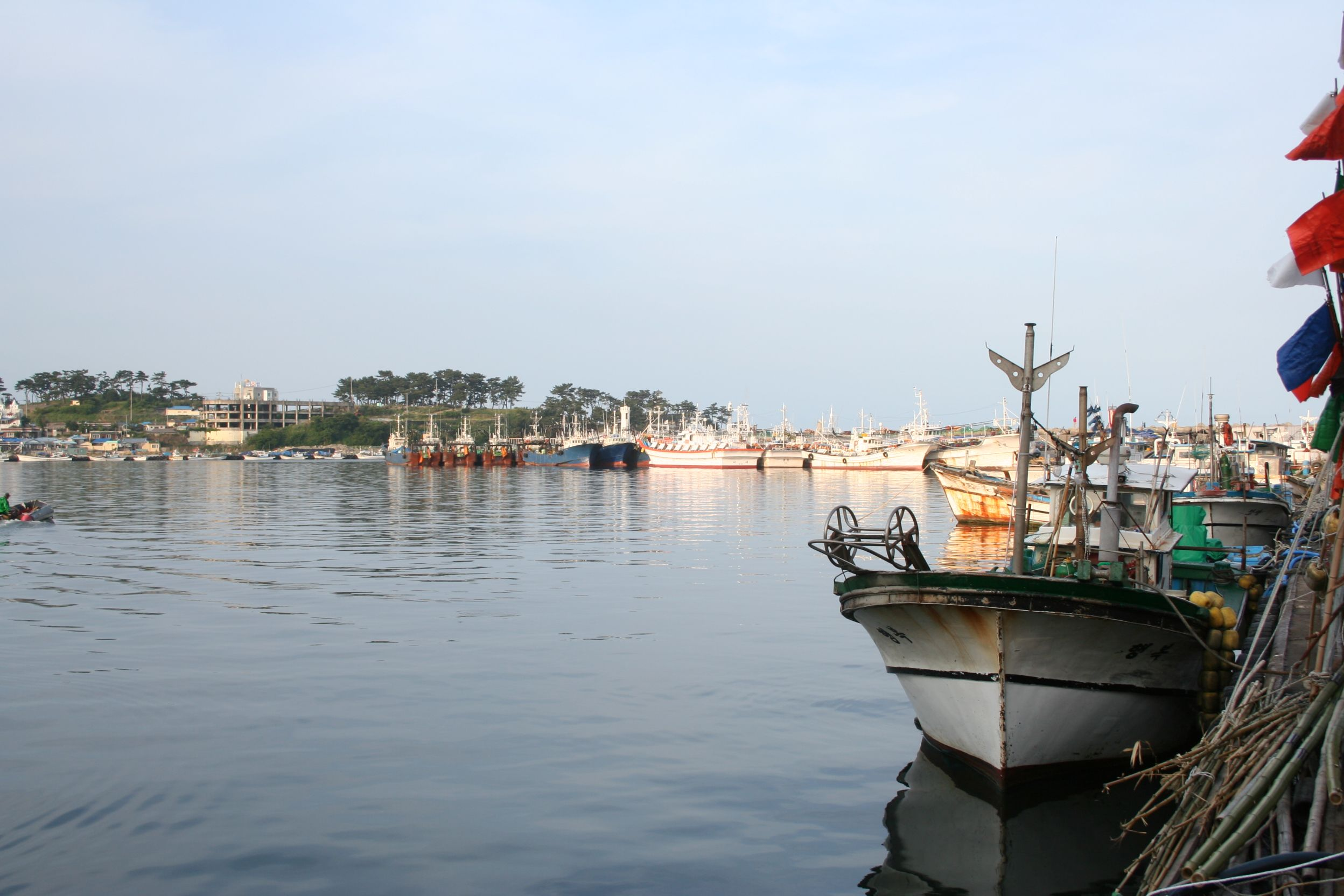
Gampo Port

The economy of Gyeongju is diverse. Although tourism is important to the economy, most residents work in other fields. Over 27,000 are employed in manufacturing compared to roughly 13,500 in the hospitality industry. The number involved in tourism has remained constant over recent years, while the manufacturing sector added about 6,000 jobs from 1999 to 2003. The manufacturing sector is closely tied to nearby cities, utilizing Gyeongju's transit links with Ulsan, Pohang, and Daegu. As in Ulsan and Daegu the automotive parts industry plays an important role. Of the 1,221 businesses incorporated in Gyeongju almost a third are involved in auto-parts manufacture.

Fishing takes place in coastal towns, especially in Gampo-eup in the city's northeast, with 436 registered fishing craft in the city. Fishing industry in Gyeongju is generally in a declined status due to relatively inconvenient transport conditions and lacks of subordinate facilities. Much of the catch from these boats goes direct from the harbor to Gyeongju's many seafood restaurants. Mainly, sauries, anchovies and rays are harvested and a small number of abalone and wakame farming takes place. Local specialties include myeolchijeot (fermented anchovy), abalone, wakame, and squid.

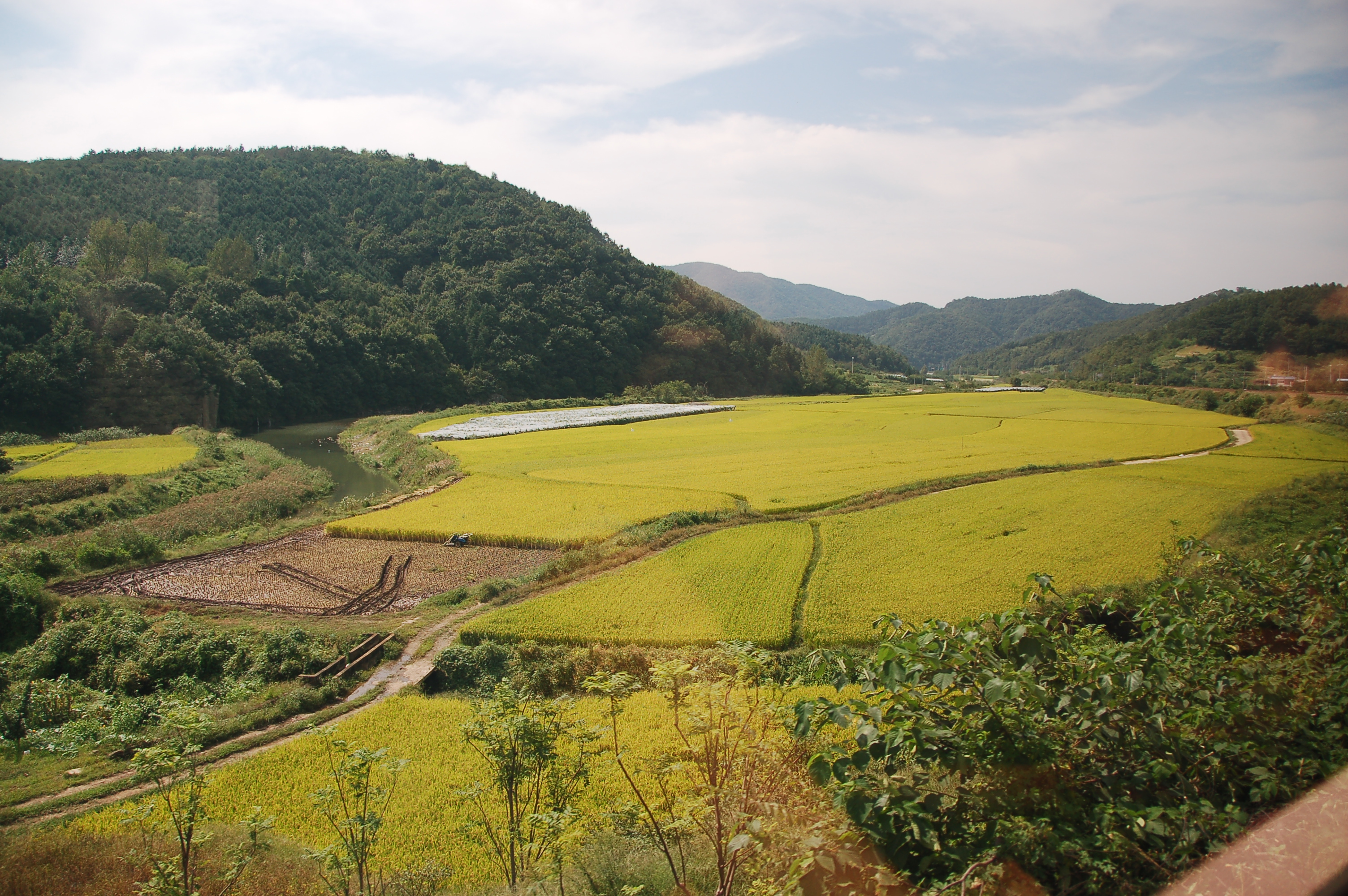
Paddy fields in Gyeongju

Agriculture is still important, particularly in the outlying regions of Gyeongju. According to the 2006 statistical yearbook of Gyeongju, rice fields occupy an area of 169.57 km^{2} (65.47 sq mi), which is 70% of the total cultivated acreage of 24,359 km^{2} (9,405 sq mi). The remaining 74.02 km^{2} (28.58 sq mi) consists of fields under other crops and farmsteads. Crop production is centered in the fertile river basins near the Hyeongsan River. The main crops are rice, barley, beans and corn. Vegetables such as radish and napa cabbage and fruits are also important crops. Apples are mainly produced in the districts of Geoncheon-eup, Gangdong-myeon and Cheonbuk-myeon and Korean pear are cultivated in Geoncheon-eup and Angang-eup. The city plays a leading role in the domestic production of beef and mushrooms. Button mushrooms harvested in Geoncheon-eup are canned and exported. The cultivated acreage and the number of households engaging in agriculture is however declining.

A small amount of quarrying activity takes place in the city, with 46 active mines and quarries in Gyeongju. Most are engaged in the extraction of kaolin, fluorspar and Agalmatolite and Kaolin is exported.

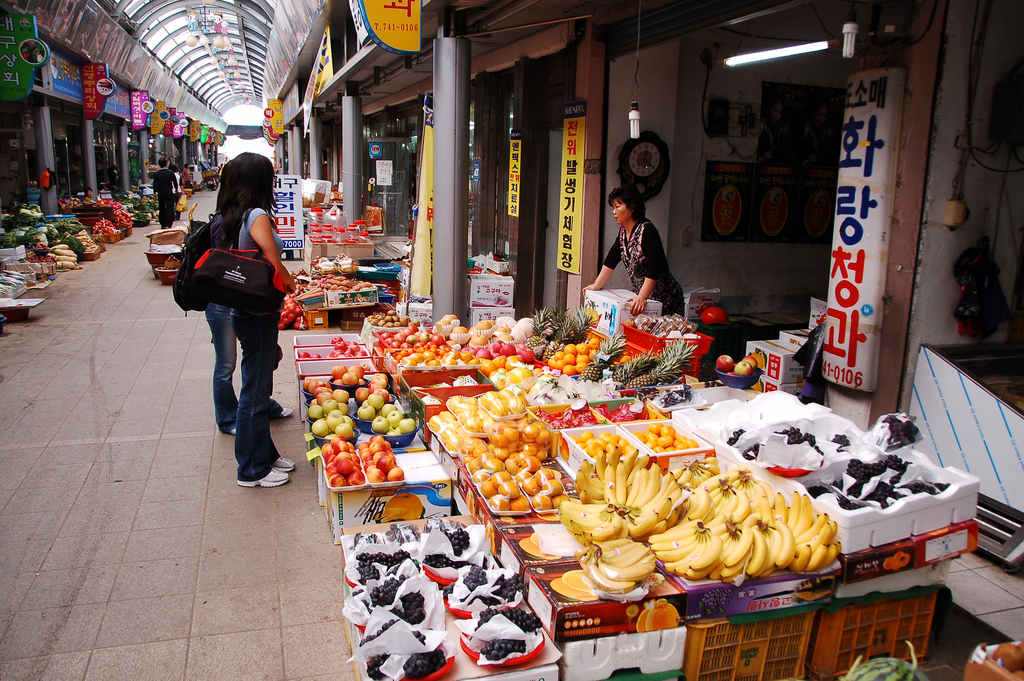
A fruit shop at Seongdong Market

As the capital of Silla, commerce and trading in Gyeongju developed early on. Samguk sagi has records on the establishment of Gyeongdosi (capital area market) in March, 490 during King Soji's reign, and Dongsi (East Market) in 509, during King Jijeung's reign. In the 1830s, Gyeongju had five five-day markets which remained very active until the late 1920s. Due to its size Gyeongju Bunaejang (Gyeongju village market) was referred to as one of the two leading markets in the Yeongnam area, along with Daegu Bunaejang. Transportation developed in the late period of the Japanese occupation, as the Jungang Line and the Daegu Line and the connecting route between Pohang and the northwestern part of Japan were set up, leading to increasing population and developing commerce. After the 1960s, traditional periodic markets gradually transformed into regular markets as the city was flourishing. In periodic markets, agricultural and marine products, industrial products, living necessaries, wild edible greens, herbs, and cattle are mainly traded. As of 2006, Gyeongju had eight regular markets, nine periodic markets and the Gyeongju department store. Traditional periodic markets declined and have become token affairs these days.

== Tourism ==
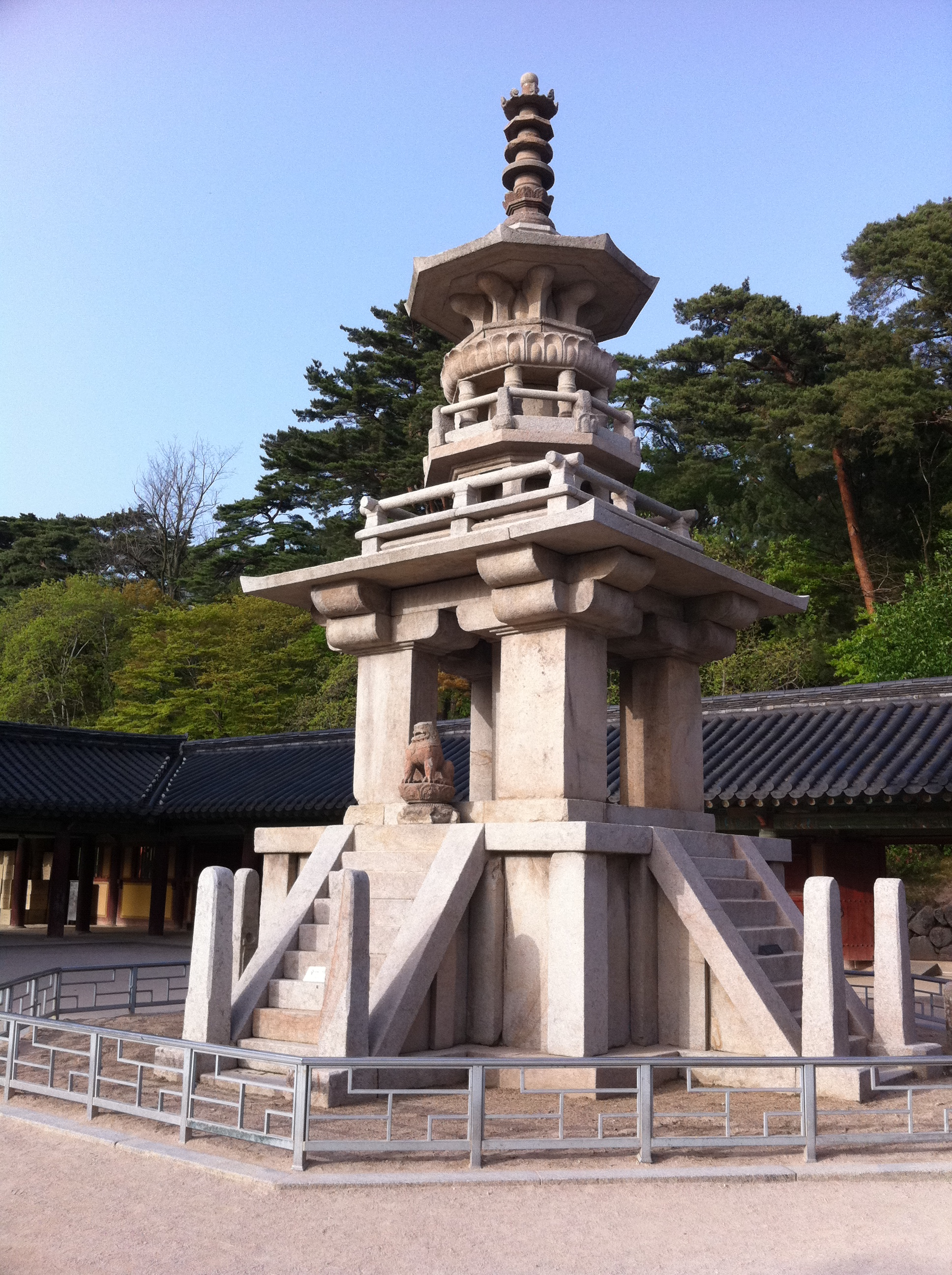
Dabotap pagoda at Bulguksa temple

Gyeongju is a major tourist destination for South Koreans as well as foreign visitors. It boasts 1000 years of Silla heritage with vast number of ancient ruins and archaeological sites found throughout the city, which help to attract 6 million visiting tourists including 750,000 foreigners per year. The city government has parlayed its historic status into a basis for other tourism-related developments such as conferences, festivals, and resorts.

Many Silla sites are located in Gyeongju National Park such as the Royal Tomb Complex, the Cheomseongdae observatory that is one of the oldest surviving astronomical observatories in East Asia, the Anapji royal pond garden, and the Gyerim forest. Gyeongju National Museum hosts many important artifacts and national treasures that have been excavated from sites within the city and surrounding areas.

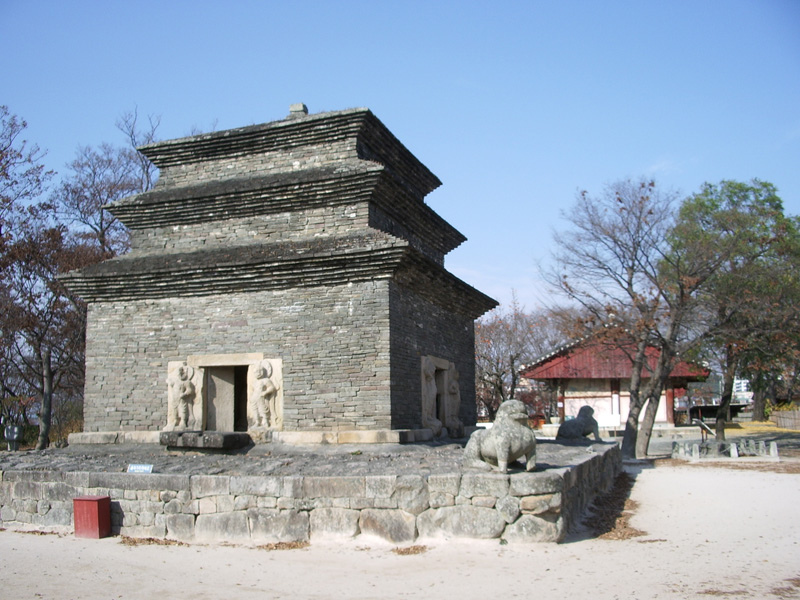
Bunhwangsa pagoda, National Treasure of Korea No. 30

Much of Gyeongju's heritage are related to the Silla kingdom's patronage of Buddhism. The grotto of Seokguram and the temple of Bulguksa were the first Korean sites to be included on the UNESCO World Heritage List in 1995. In addition, the ruins of the old Hwangnyongsa temple, said to have been Korea's largest, are preserved on the slopes of Tohamsan. Various Silla-era stone carvings of Buddhas and Bodhisattvas are found on mountainsides throughout the city, particularly on Namsan.

A significant portion of Gyeongju's tourist traffic is due to the city's promotion of itself as a site for various festivals, conferences, and competitions. Every year since 1962, the Silla cultural festival has been held in October to celebrate and honour the dynasty's history and culture. It is one of the major festivals of Korea. It features athletic events, folk games, music, dance, literary contests and Buddhist religious ceremonies. Other festivals include the Cherry Blossom Marathon in April, the Korean Traditional Liquor and Cake festival in March, and memorial ceremonies for the founders of the Silla Dynasty and General Kim Yu-sin.

There were 15 hotels including Hilton Hotel, Gyeongju Chosun Hotel, and 276 lodging facilities, and 2,817 restaurants in Gyeongju in 2006.

Gyeongju's emerging tourist attraction is the shopping street Hwangnidan-gil. The address of Hwangnidan-gil is 1080, Poseok-ro, Gyeongju, North Gyeongsang Province. There are about 400 stores, including restaurants, cafes, bookstores, and gift shops. Hwangnidan-gil became popular through social networking sites, and neighboring Gyeongju's historical site is designated as a UNESCO World Heritage Site. The advantage of the Hwangnidan-gil is the result of voluntary efforts by merchants without help from local governments.

=== List of tourist attractions ===
- Bulguksa
- Seokguram
- Yangdong Folk Village
- Donggung Palace and Wolji Pond
- Oreung
- Daereungwon
- Hwangnidan-gil
- Woljeonggyo
- Gyochon Traditional Village
- Namsan
- Gyeongjueupseong
- Gyeongju East Palace Garden (Donggungwon)
- Gyeongju World
- Tohamsan

== Media ==
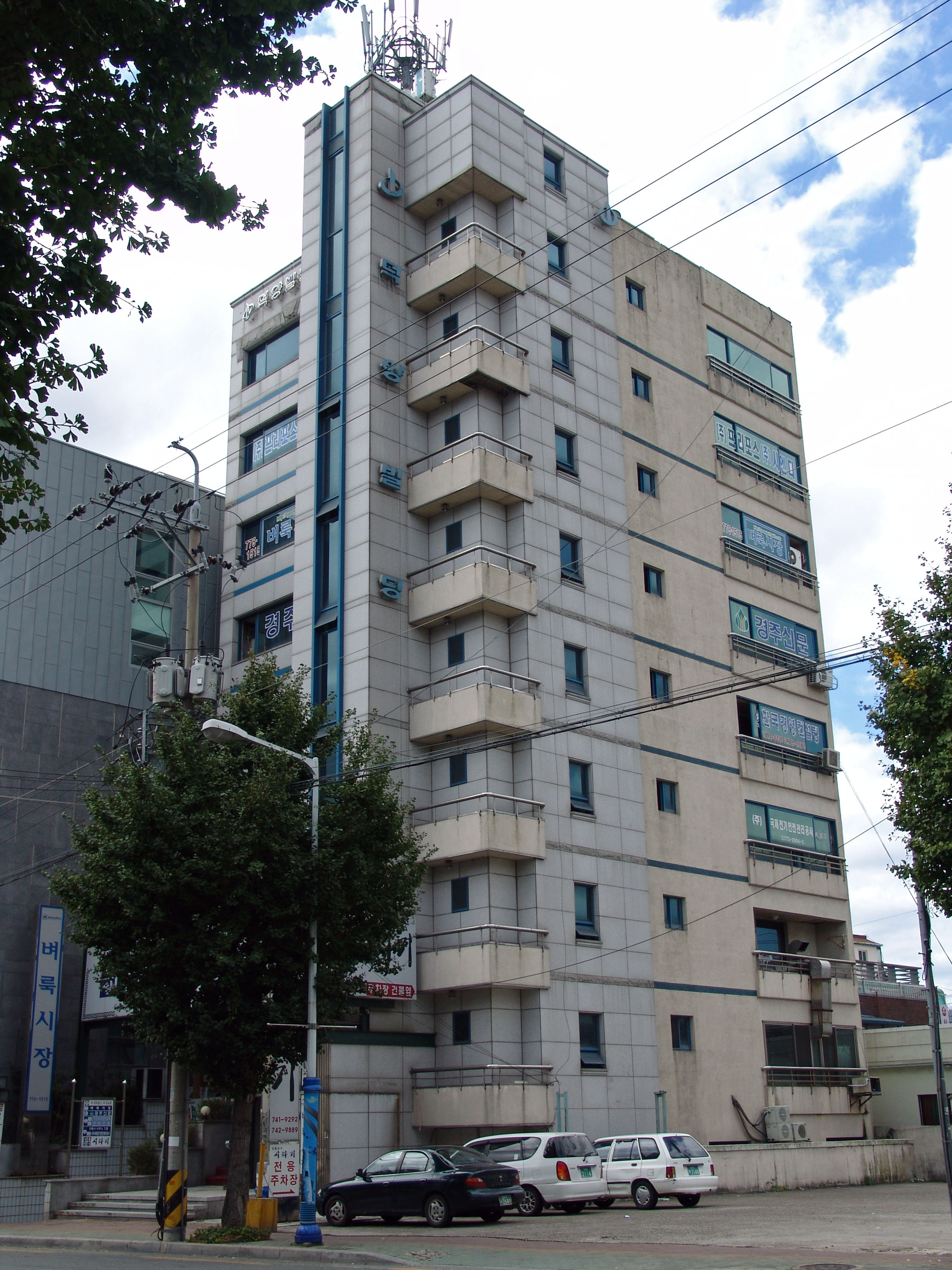
Gyeongju Sinmun, a local newspaper company is housed in this building.

Gyeongju has two main local newspapers; the Gyeongju Sinmun and the Seorabeol Sinmun. Both are weekly newspapers providing news via online as well and their headquarters are located in the neighborhood of Dongcheon-dong. The Gyeongju Sinmun was founded in 1989 and provides various news and critics on anything concerning Gyeongju. Its online newspaper, Digital Gyeongju Sinmun opened in December 2000 to provide live local news out of the limit as a weekly newspaper and to establish mutual information exchanges from Gyeongju locals. In 2001, Gyeongju Sinmun started to present Gyeongju Citizen Awards to people who try to develop the local industry and economy, culture and education, and welfare service. Since 2003, the Wolseong Nuclear Power Plant headquarter co-hosts the awards with Gyeongju Sinmun.

The Seorabeol Sinmun was established in 1993, however, from 15 November 2000, to 10 November 2005, its publication was stopped for financial difficulties after the 1997 Asian economic crisis had left a strong impact on the nationwide economy. Since 2006, Seorabeol Sinmun presents Serabeol Awards to people having devouring to develop Gyeongju.

Several major feature films have been filmed in the city, including Kick the Moon, On the Occasion of Remembering the Turning Gate, Taegukgi, Chwihwaseon and others. In 2009, the filming of the Queen Seondeok, a popular MBC TV series took place in a studio at Silla Millennium Park located in Bomun Lake Resort.

== Education ==
Gyeongju is strongly associated with the education tradition of Hwarangdo ("Way of the Flower of Young Men") which was established and flourished during the Silla period. It is a military and philosophical code that offered the basis of training to Hwarang, a military cadet of youths from the aristocratic class. The training equally emphasized practicing academic and martial arts based on Buddhism and patriotism. A number of Silla's greatest generals and military leaders such as Kim Yu-sin were Hwarang who played a central role in Silla unification of the Korean peninsula. As Silla was integrated into the next ruling dynasty, Goryeo, the system declined and was officially disbanded in the Joseon period. However, the spirit and discipline were revived in the second half of the 20th century as a form of Korean martial arts with the same name.

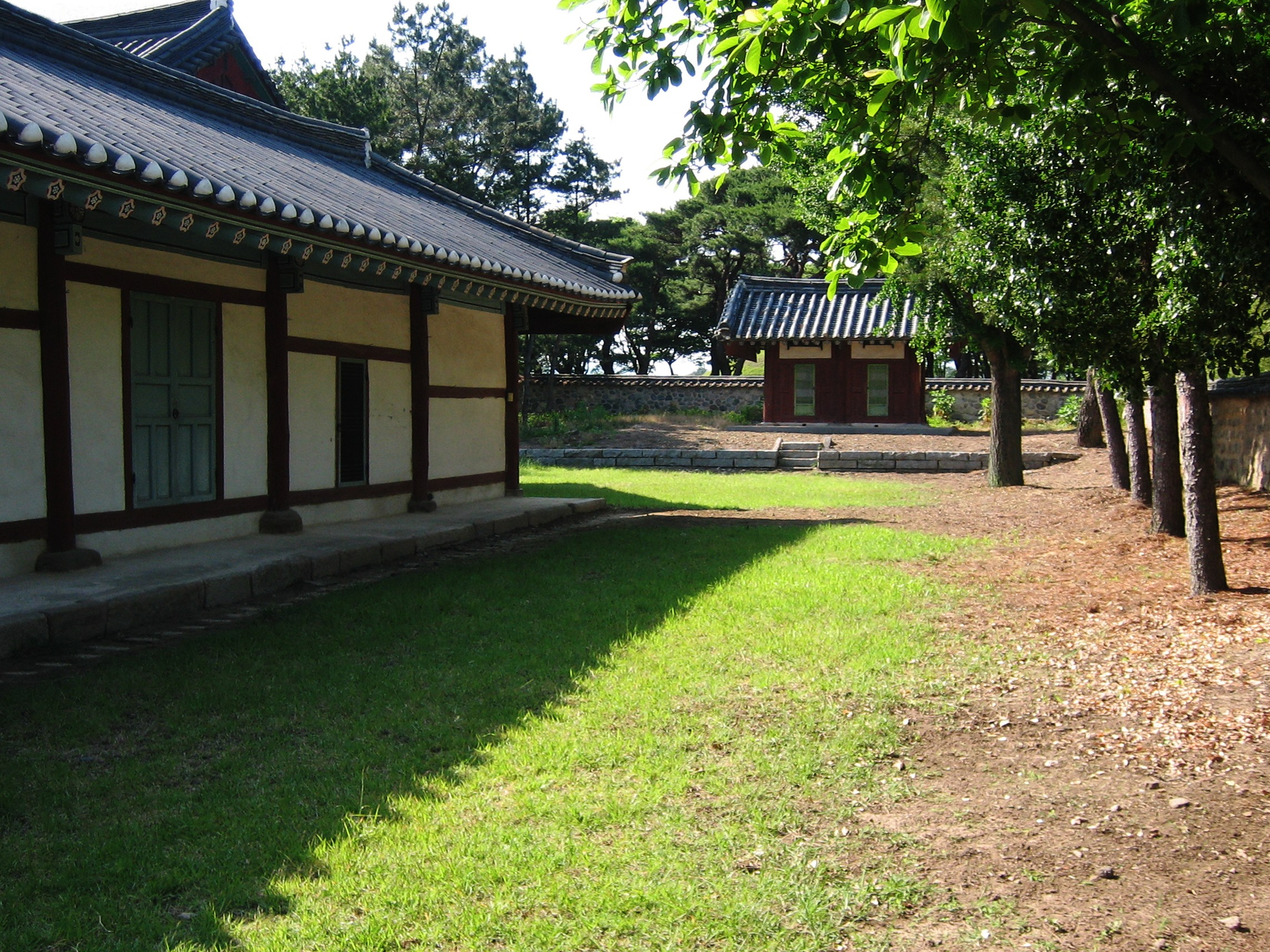
A building of the Gyeongju Hyanggyo

Formal education has a longer history in Gyeongju than anywhere else in South Korea. The Gukhak, or national academy, was established here in 682, at the beginning of the Unified Silla period. Its curriculum focused on the Confucian classics for local officials. After the fall of Silla in the 10th century, the Gukhak closed. However, due to Gyeongju's role as a provincial center under the Goryeo and early Joseon dynasties, the city was home to state-sponsored provincial schools (hyanggyo) under both dynasties such as Gyeongju Hyanggyo. During the later Joseon dynasty there were several seowon, or private Confucian academies, were set up in the city such as Oksan Seowon and Seoak Seowon.

The education system of Gyeongju is the same as elsewhere in the country. Schooling begins with preschools; there are 65 in the city. This is followed by six years in elementary schools; Gyeongju has 46. Subsequently, students pass through three years of middle school. There are 19 middle schools in Gyeongju. High school education, which lasts for three years, is not compulsory, but most students attend and graduate from high school. Gyeongju is home to 21 high schools, of which 11 provide specialized technical training. At each of these levels, there is a mix of public and private institutions. All are overseen by the Gyeongju bureau of North Gyeongsang's Provincial Office of Education. Gyeongju is home to a school for the mentally disabled, which provides education to students from preschool to adult age.

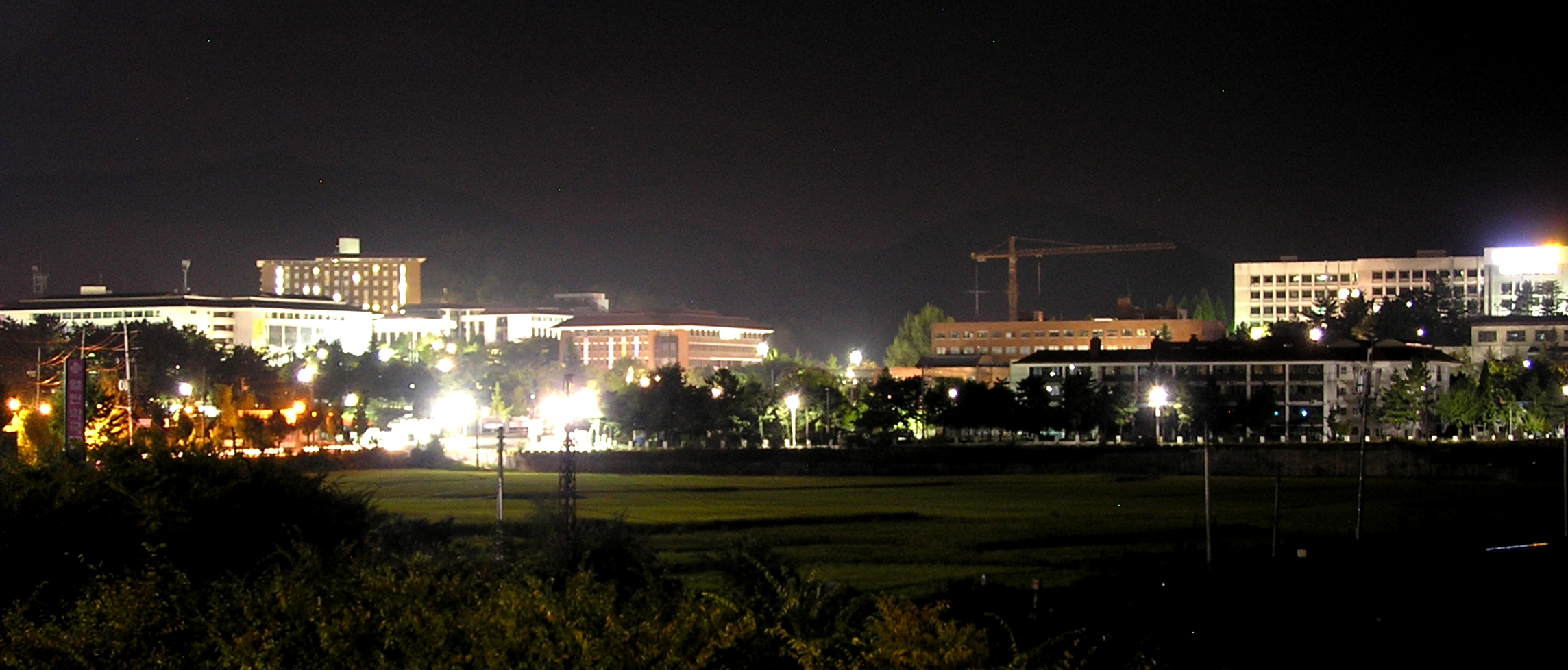
Campus of Dongguk University in Gyeongju at night

Gyeongju is home to four institutions of tertiary education. Sorabol College is a technical college in the district of Chunghyo-dong that offers majors specializing in tourism, leisure, health care and cosmetic treatments.

Each of Gyeongju's three universities reflects the city's unique role. Dongguk and Uiduk universities are Buddhist institutions, reflecting that religion's link to the city. Gyeongju University, formerly Korea Tourism University, is strongly focused on tourism, reflecting its importance in the region.

== Infrastructure ==
=== Healthcare ===
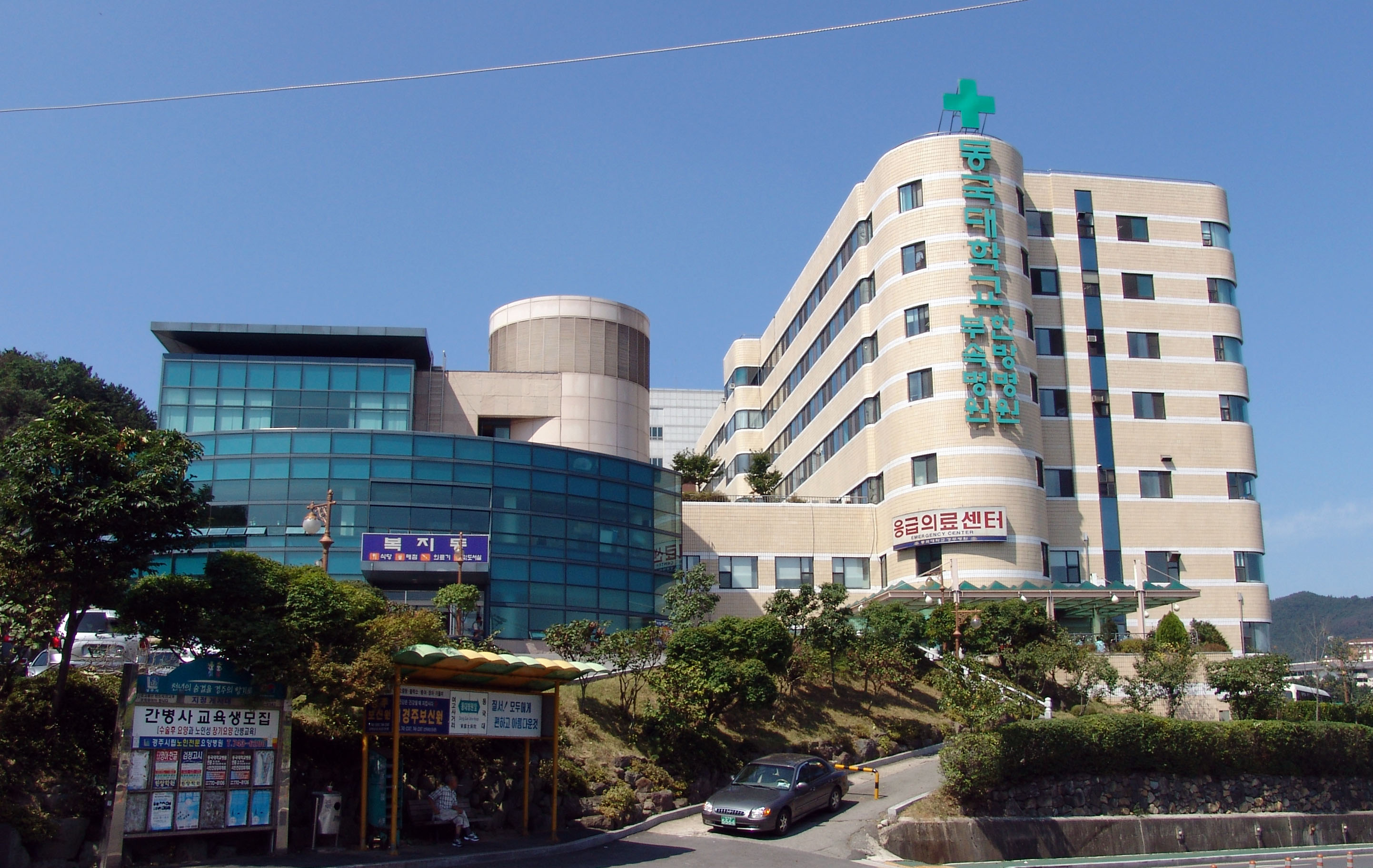
Dongguk University Gyeongju Hospital

According to the 2008 yearbook of Gyeongju, the total number of medical institutions was 224 with 3,345 beds, including two general hospitals, thirteen hospitals, 109 clinics, five nursing homes, forty-two dental hospitals, two Korean traditional medicine hospitals and 50 Korean traditional medicine clinics. There are also twenty-eight medical institutions related to Gyeongju Health Center affiliated to the Gyeongju City government.

The two general hospitals are associated with two major universities in Gyeongju and nearby Daegu. One is the Dongguk University Gyeongju Hospital, located in the district of Seokjang-dong, which is affiliated with Dongguk University Medical School and Center. The Gyeongju Hospital was opened in a seven-story building in 1991 to provide Gyeongju locals with a quality medical service and train medical specialists in the region. After various renovations the hospital currently has 24 departments including a radiation oncology center and 438 beds. It is also assigned as a teaching and learning hospital and in partnership with Dongguk University Oriental Hospital. The other general hospital is a branch of Keimyung University, Dongsan Medical Hospital in Daegu. It is the successor of Gyeongju Christianity Hospital founded in 1962, and was reborn as the current general hospital in 1991. The Gyeongju Dongsan Hospital is located in the district of Seobu-dong and has 12 departments in a three-story building.

=== Utilities ===
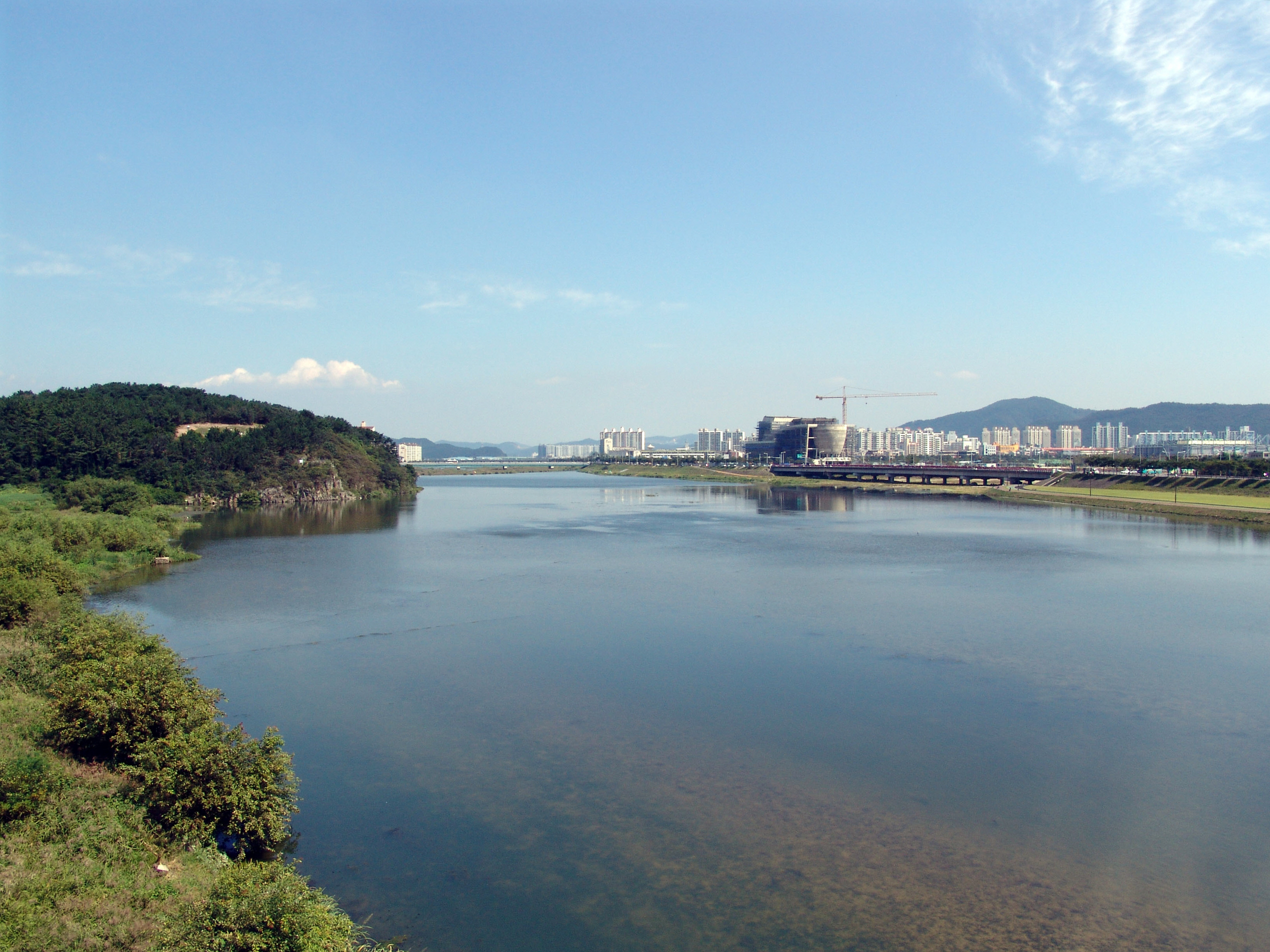
A view of Hyeongsan River from Dong Bridge. The river is one of water sources of Gyeongju.

Water supply and sewage disposal are municipal services which are respectively handled by the Water Supply Office and Water Quality and Environment Office. Water comes from the Hyeongsan River, the multi-purpose Deokdong Dam and several streams. The city is divided into seven water districts, with eight filtration plants and seven sewage treatment plants. One of the sewage treatment plants, Angang Sewage Disposal Plant began operating in April 2005 by the co-investment of the governments of North Gyeongsang and Gyeongju with a fund of 44,300,000,000 won to install facilities to prevent the pollution of the Hyeongsan River, which is a main water source for Gyeongju and Pohang residents. The plant is located on a spacious site with 39,000 m^{2} (420,000 sq ft) in Homyeong-ri, Gangdong-myeon in Gyeongju where nature friendly facilities provide recreational venues for the locals. Through 56.1 km (34.9 mi) of sewer pipes and 14 pumping stations, the plant has a capacity of 18,000 tonnes of domestic sewage per day that comes from Angang-eup, and Gangdong-myeon. The facilities have high-powered disposal equipment developed by related industrial companies to maintain the discharged water at the first or second degree in quality, so that it is used as river maintenance flow and agricultural water in case a drought occurs.

The city had managed its own recycling service, but privatized it since 1 July 2009.

Other utilities are provided by private entities or South Korean government-owned companies. Seorabeol City Gas, an affiliate of GS Group, provides gas to the Gyeongju residents, while, electrical power is supplied by the public enterprises, Korea Hydro & Nuclear Power via the Wolseong Nuclear Power Plant. The plant is known for the only nuclear power plant operating PHWRs (Pressurized Heavy Water Reactor) in South Korea and supplies about 5% of South Korea's electricity. The owner, Korea Hydro & Nuclear Power began to build the Wolseong 1 in the districts of Yangnam-myeon, Yangbuk-myeon and Gampo-eup in 1976. Since 1983, the power plant has been providing commercial service and operating with the PHWRs that has a capacity of 678,000 kW. As the construction of each Wolseong 2, 3 and 4 with a capacity of 70,000 kW were completed respectively in 1997, 1998 and 1999, Wolseong Nuclear Power plant site has been successfully operating the four PHWRs plants. New project, Sinwolseong No. 1 and No. 2 are currently under construction which is estimated to be completed until 2011–12. The Wolseong Low and Intermediate Level Radioactive Waste Disposal Center, which treats and stores low and intermediate level radioactive waste from the local power plants, is overseen and inspected by the Korea Institute of Nuclear Safety (KINS).

=== Transportation ===
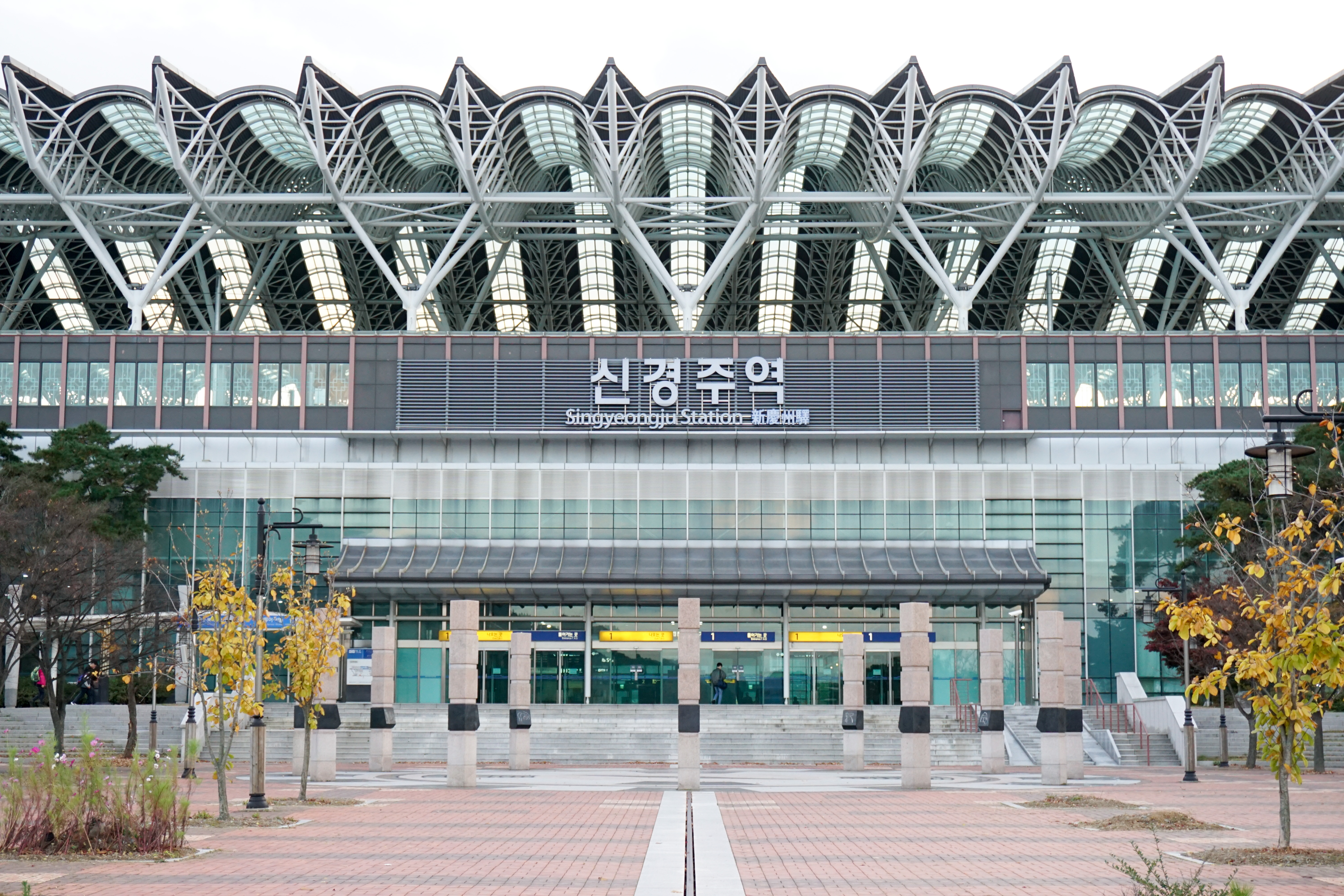
Gyeongju train station

The city lies at the junction of two minor lines operated by the Korean National Railroad. The Jungang Line runs from Seoul to Gyeongju and carries trains from the Daegu Line, which originates in Dongdaegu. In Gyeongju, the Jungang line connects to the Donghae Line which runs between Busan and Yeongdeok. The Gyeongbu Expressway, which runs from Seoul to Busan, passes through Gyeongju, and Provincial Highway 68, aided by the South Korean government, connects Seocheon in South Chungcheong Province to Gyeongju. Additionally national highways such as Route 4, 7, 14, 20, 28, 31, and 35 crisscross the city. Since the city is a popular tourist destination, nonstop bus services are available from most major cities in South Korea.

High-speed rail does not serve central Gyeongju, but the KTX Gyeongbu Line stops at the nearby Gyeongju station, in Geoncheon-eup, west of Gyeongju's city center.

== Twin towns – sister cities ==
Gyeongju is twinned with:

- Inglewood, United States (1990)
- Iksan, South Korea (1998)
- Nara, Japan (1970)
- Obama, Japan (1977)
- Pompei, Italy (1985)
- Versailles, France (1987)
- Quebec City, Canada (2006)
- Xi'an, China (2007)
- Huế, Vietnam (2007)
- Nitra, Slovakia (2014)
- Ōita Prefecture, Japan (2023)
- Chizhou, China (2023)
- Qabala, Azerbaijan

== See also ==
- Geography of South Korea
- List of cities in South Korea
- Southeastern Maritime Industrial Region
- World Heritage Site
- Tourism in South Korea
