= Gyeongju Sinmun =

South Korean weekly regional newspaper

Gyeongju Silnum
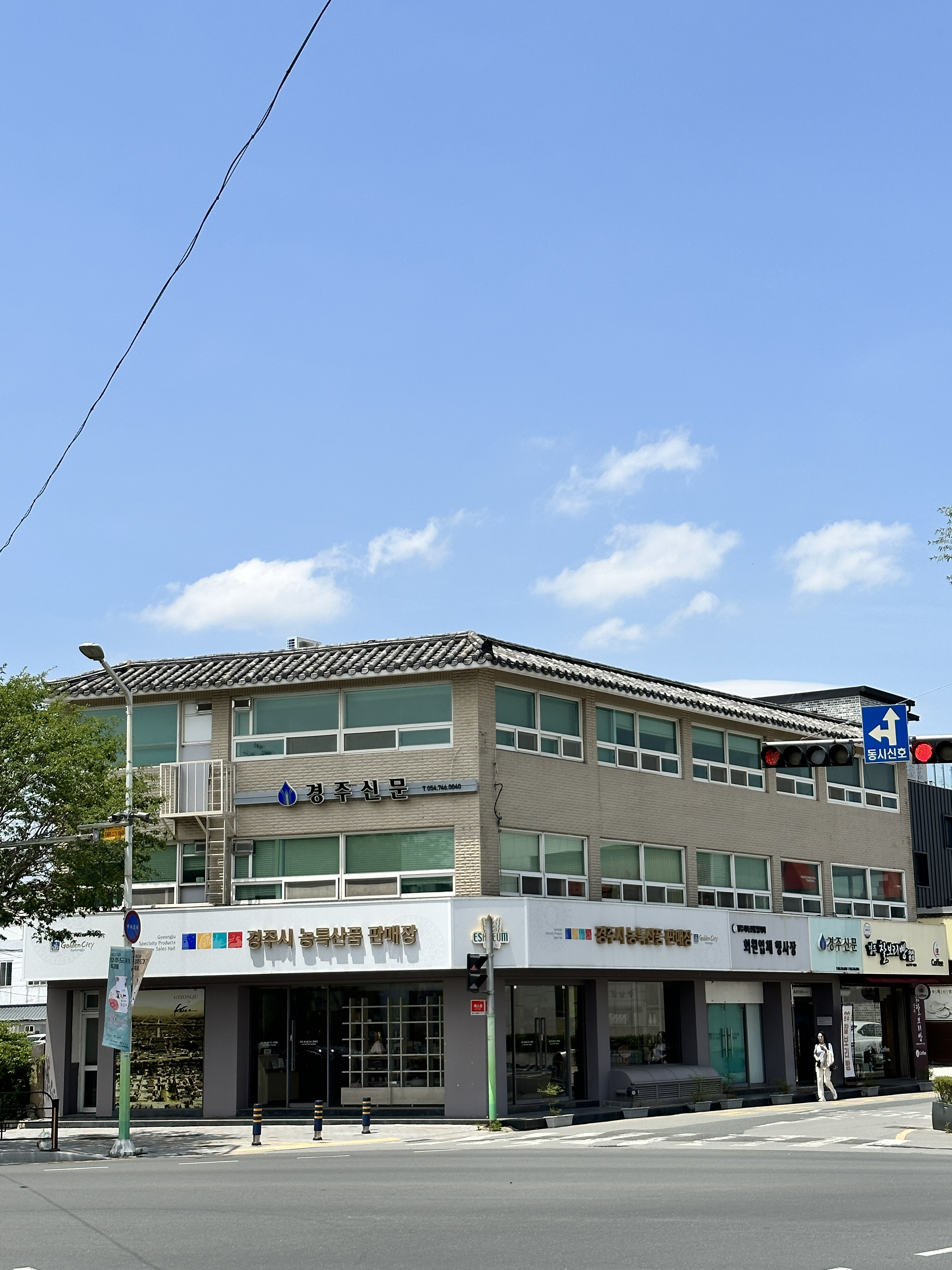
- The newspaper headquarters (2023)
- Type: Weekly newspaper
- Publisher: Kim Heon-deok (김헌덕)
- Founded: 1989
- Language: Korean
- Headquarters: Dongcheon-dong, Gyeongju
- Circulation: 11,000

Korean name
- Hangul: 경주신문
- Hanja: 慶州新聞
- RR: Gyeongju sinmun
- MR: Kyŏngju sinmun

The Gyeongju Sinmun (Korean: 경주신문) is a weekly newspaper published in Gyeongju, South Korea.

== History ==
The newspaper was founded in the district of Dongcheon-dong on November 15, 1989 and publishes about 11,000 prints per week. It provides various news and critics on anything concerning Gyeongju. Its online newspaper, Digital Gyeongju Sinmun opened in December, 2000 to provide live local news out of the limit as a weekly newspaper and to establish mutual information exchanges from Gyeongju locals. "I'm a reporter too" section allows people voluntarily to write articles. In 2001, Gyeongju Sinmun started to present Gyeongju Citizen Awards to people who try to develop the local industry and economy, culture and education, and welfare service. Since 2003, the Wolseong Nuclear Power Plant headquarters co-hosts the awards with Gyeongju Sinmun.

== See also ==
- List of newspapers in South Korea
