= Oksan Seowon, Gyeongju =

UNESCO World Heritage Site in South Korea

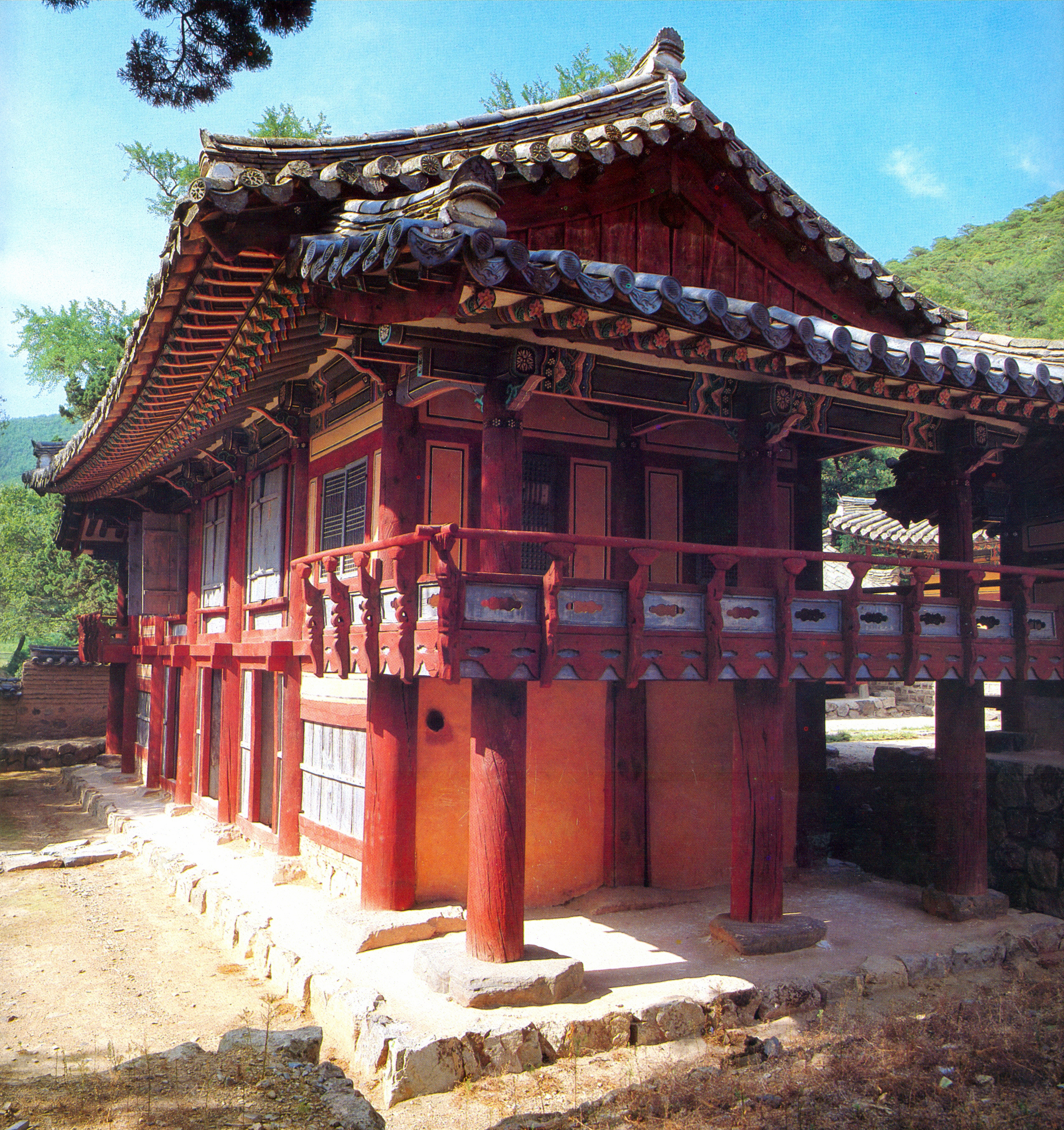
- Interactive map of the Oksan Seowon, Gyeongju area

General information
- Location: Oksan-ri, Angang-eup, Gyeongju, South Korea
- Coordinates: 36°0′43″N 129°9′49″E

Design and construction
- Designations

UNESCO World Heritage Site
- Official name: Oksan-seowon
- Criteria: (iii)
- Designated: 2019
- Part of: Seowon, Korean Neo-Confucian Academies
- Reference no.: 1498-003

UNESCO World Heritage Site
- Criteria: (iii), (iv)
- Designated: 2010
- Part of: Historic Villages of Korea: Hahoe and Yangdong
- Reference no.: 1324-004

Historic Sites of South Korea
- Official name: Oksanseowon Confucian Academy, Gyeongju
- Designated: 1967-03-08
- Reference no.: 154

Korean name
- Hangul: 옥산서원
- Hanja: 玉山書院
- RR: Oksan seowon
- MR: Oksan sŏwŏn

The Oksan Seowon (Korean: 옥산서원; Hanja: 玉山書院) is a seowon located at Oksan-ri, Angang-eup in the city of Gyeongju, North Gyeongsang Province, South Korea. Seowon is a type of local academy during the Joseon Dynasty (1392–1897). It was established by Yi Je-min (李齊閔), the minister of Gyeongju and local Confucian scholars in 1572, the fifth year of King Seonjo's reign, to commemorate the scholarly achievement and virtue of Confucian scholar and politician Yi Ŏnjŏk (1491–1553).

Hoejae Yeongjeok left office and built the main building as the main building in the stream of Oksan in Gyeongju's Angang-eup near Yangdong Village. For this reason, after Hoejae died, Oksan Seowon was built near Dokrakdang. Oksan Seowon is located in Seshimdae, and it means to wash one's mind with water falling from Yongchu and seek learning through nature.

== See also ==
- Dosan Seowon
- Korean Confucianism
