= Changnyeong-eup =

Coordinates: 35°32′40″N 128°29′32″E

- Town
- Panoramic view of Changnyeong-eup

- Location in South Korea
- Country: South Korea
- Region: Gyeongnam
- Established: 555
- Administrative divisions: 17 Legal village 법정리, 31 administrative villages 행정리, 161 neighborhoods 반

Government
  - Mayor: Chung Shik Kim 김충식

Area
  - Total: 61.42 km^{2} (23.71 sq mi)
- Elevation: 2 m (6.6 ft)

Population (April 2013)
  - Total: 16,723
  - Dialect: Gyeongsang
- Time zone: UTC+09:00
- Website: Changnyeong City Office

Korean name
- Hangul: 창녕읍
- Hanja: 昌寧邑
- RR: Changnyeong-eup
- MR: Ch'angnyŏng-ŭp

Changnyeong-eup (Korean: 창녕읍) is a town (eup) in the administrative county of Changnyeong, South Gyeongsang Province, in South Korea.

The town is Changnyeong county's administrative, business, and traffic center where most of the farm produce is bought and sold. It is nearly in the center of the county and is accessible via the Seoul-Busan expressway and national roads 5 and 24.

Changnyeong Town contains many national treasures and is situated in the middle of Changnyeong county's three major tourist attractions, Upo wetland, Bugok natural hotsprings, and Hwawang mountain.

== Etymology ==
Changnyeong (from Korean Changnyeong 'prosperous peace';from chang (Korean)창,(Hanja)昌 'prosperity' and nyeong (Korean)녕,(Hanja)寧 'peace')

== Outline ==
Changnyeong is located in the central eastern part of Changnyeong county, with Miryang (밀양시) and Muan township (무안면) to the east, Goam township (고암면) to the north, Daeji township (대지면) and Yueo township (유어면) to the west, and Kyeseong township (계성면) to the south. The eastern part of the town is mountainous beginning with Mount Hwawang. The western part of the town has a hot and humid climate and is made up of rolling plains which are used for cultivating rice, onions, garlic, and peppers.

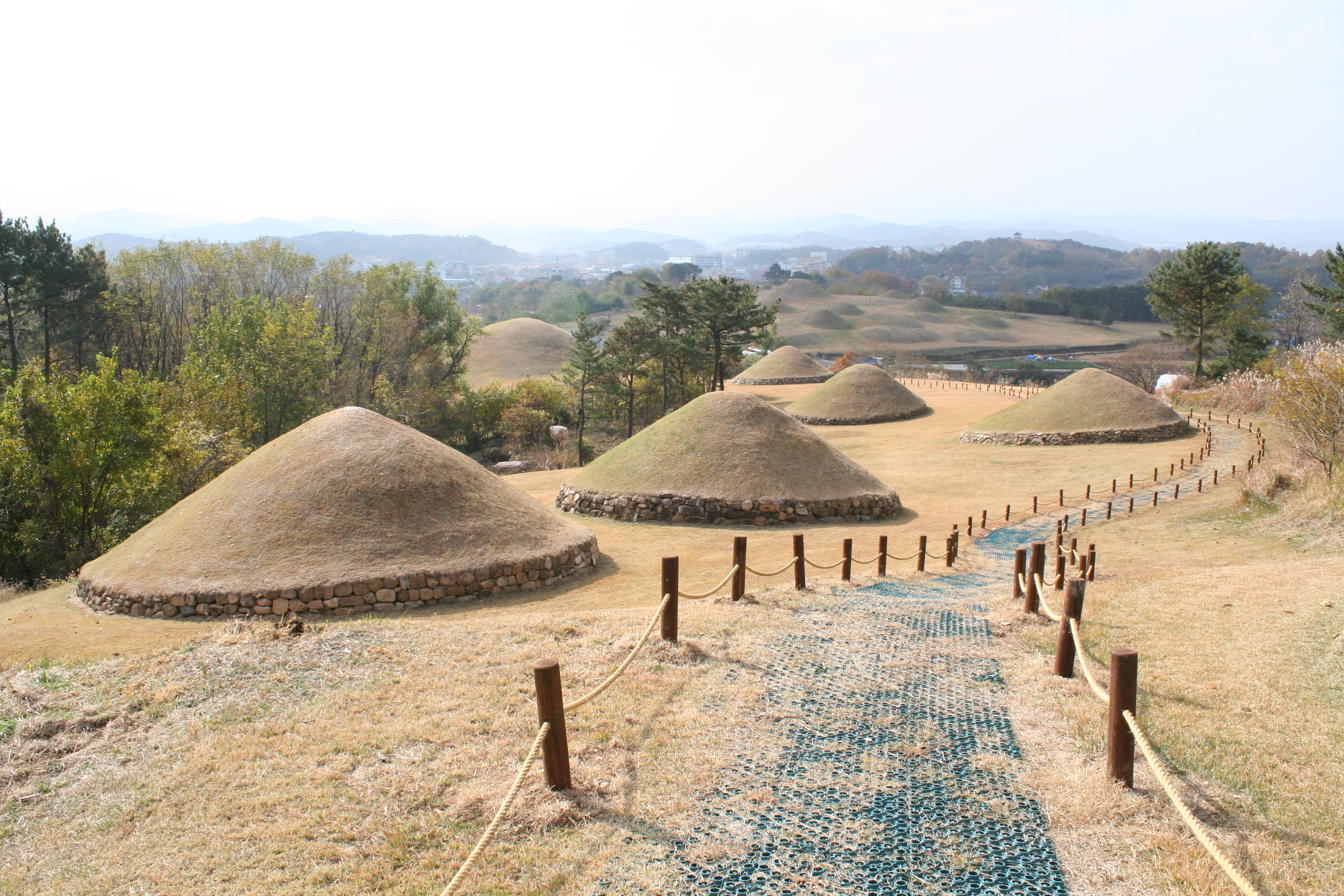
Changnyeong royal graves

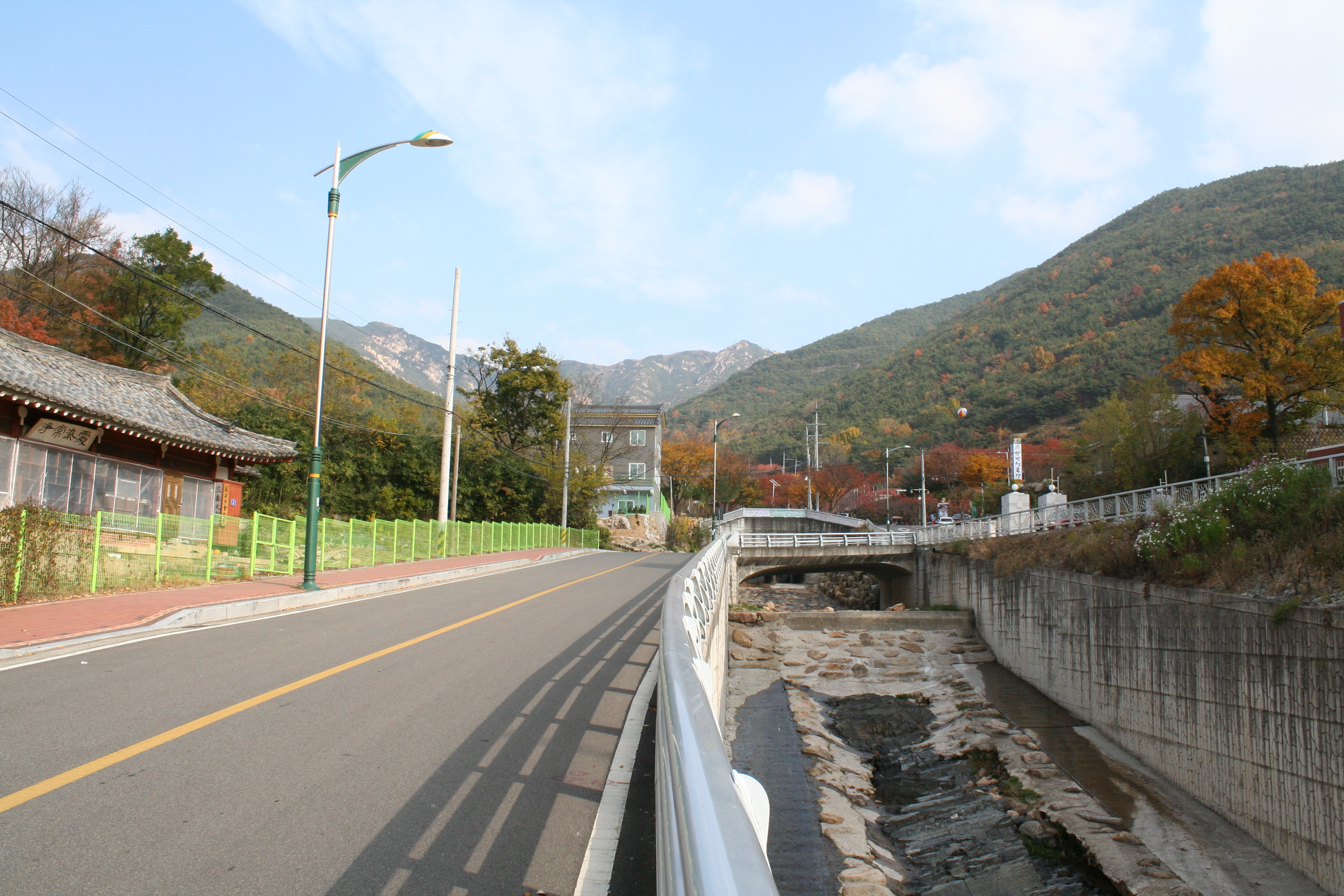
Changnyeong road to Mount Hwawang

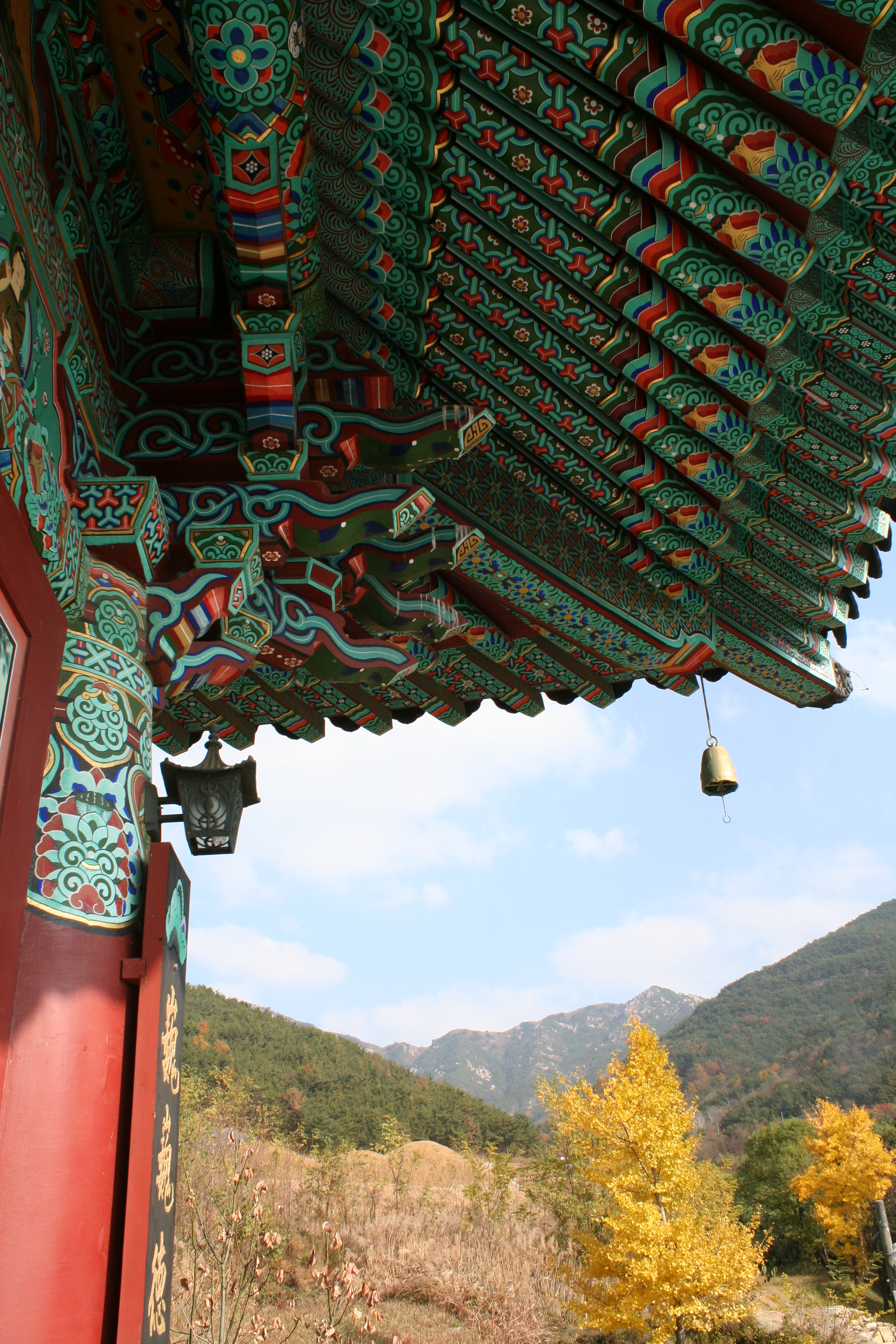
Changnyeong Temple at the base of Mount Hwawang

== History ==
Timeline of Changnyeong history:

- 555: Silla King JinHeung (신라 진흥왕) Reigned for 16 years and named Changnyeong Bisabeol (비사벌)
- 757: Silla King GyeongDeok (신라 경덕왕) Reigned for 16 years and called Changnyeong Eubne township in Hwawang county (화왕군 읍내면)
- 940: Koryeo's first King Wang Geon 왕건 Taejo (고려 태조) : Changed the county name to Changnyeong county 창녕군 읍내면
- 1914 April 1: Goam township Doya village (고암면 도야리), was incorporated
- 1918 January 1 : Eubne township (읍내) was renamed to Changnyeong township (창녕면)
- 1955 July 1 : Changnak (창락면) township and Changnyeong township (창녕면) were merged
- 1960 January 1 : Changnyeong township (창녕면) was designated as a town (eub/eup 읍)

== Administrative divisions ==
- ShinChon (신촌리)
- Yeocho (여초리)
- Okcheon (옥천리)
- Waebu (외부리)
- Yongseok (용석리)
- Josan (조산리)
- Jikkyo (직교리)
- Tamha (탐하리)
- Twaecheon (퇴천리)
- Ha (하리)
- Malheul (말흘리)
- Doya (도야리)
- Kyoha (교하리)
- Kyo (교리)
- Kyosang (교상리)
- Songhyeon (송현리)
- Suljeong (술정리)

== Educational Institutions ==
- MyeongDeok Elementary (명덕초등학교)
- Changnyeong Elementary (창녕초등학교)
- Changnyeong Middle (창녕중학교)
- Changnyeong Girl's Middle School (창녕여자중학교)
- Changnyeong Girl's High School (창녕여자고등학교)
- Changnyeong First High and Middle School (창녕제일고등학교)

== Cultural assets ==
- Changnyeong Suljeongni Three story stone pagoda 삼층석탑 : National treasure number 520 of United Silla Dynasty

== Attractions ==
Hwawang Mountain, Changnyeong Downtown Market, Changnyeong History Museum, Seokbinggo
