= Hwawangsansŏng =

Fortress in Changnyeong, South Korea

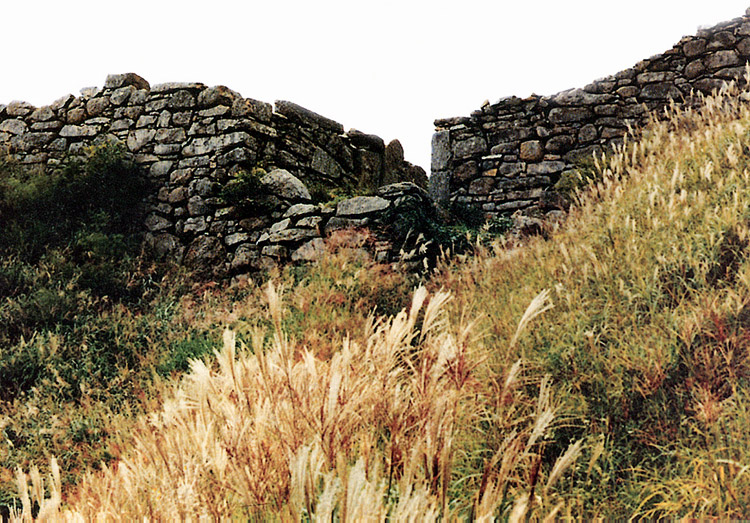
- Part of the fortress walls
- Interactive map of the Hwawangsansŏng area

General information
- Location: Hwawangsan, Changnyeong County, South Gyeongsang Province, South Korea
- Coordinates: 35°32′45″N 128°32′03″E

Design and construction
- Designations

Historic Sites of South Korea
- Designated: 1963-01-21
- Reference no.: 64

Hwawangsansŏng (Korean: 화왕산성; Hanja: 火旺山城) is an ancient Korean fortress on the mountain Hwawangsan in Changnyeong County, South Gyeongsang Province, South Korea. On January 21, 1963, it was made Historic Site of South Korea No. 64.

The fortress was first established around the 5th century as an earthen fortification. It was rebuilt using stone during the Unified Silla period in the 9th century. The fortress was renovated several times and saw use even into the Joseon period. During the 1592–1598 Imjin War, Kwak Chaeu used the fortress. It ceased to be used by the late Joseon period. It has a circumference of 2,700 m (8,900 ft).
