= Changnyeong Daeseong High School =

Private school in Changnyeong County, South Korea

Location
- South Gyeongsan Changnyeong county Daehab township Shinan Street 17 Deunji village 651-7; Changnyeong, South Gyeongsang Province; South Korea
- Coordinates: 35.60102°N 128.46092°E

Information
- Type: Private
- Motto: 참된것을 배우고 착하게 행동하며 식식하게 자라자 (Learn the truth, behave kindly, and grow bravely)
- Established: 1948
- Authority: South Gyeongsan Education Office
- Principal: Hyeon Su Jang 장현수
- Grades: 10–12
- Enrollment: (2012)
- Campus: Rural
- Campus size: 21,599 m^{2}
- Colors: Blue and Gold
- Song: 교가
- Sports: Soccer, Badminton
- Nickname: Daeseong
- Newspaper: Gyeongsan Educational
- Website: Official website

Changnyeong Daeseong High School (Korean: 창녕대성고등학교) is a private high school located in the Daehab township of Changnyeong County, South Korea.

== Overview ==
The school collaborates with many educational agencies such as Changnyeong's Youth Cultural center and has recently established a MOU (업무협약) on 21 March 2013.

== See also ==
- Changnyeong
