= Bugok =

Coordinates: 35°32′40″N 128°29′32″E

Bugok 부곡
- County

Korean transcription(s)
  - Hangul: 부곡면
  - Hanja: 釜谷面
  - Revised Romanization: Bugok-myeon
- Location in South Korea
- Country: South Korea

Area
  - Total: 40.11 km^{2} (15.49 sq mi)

Population (2010)
  - Total: 3,651
  - Dialect: Gyeongsang

Bugok township, also known as Bugok Hot Springs (부곡온천, 釜谷溫泉), is a natural Hot Springs and tourist area located in the Bugok township (부곡면) of Changnyeong County, South Gyeongsang Province, in South Korea.

== Etymology ==
Bugok (from Korean Bugok 'kettle valley'; from bu (Korean) 부, (Hanja) 釜 'kettle' and gok (Korean) 곡, (Hanja) 谷 'valley') As large kettles were used in ancient times for transporting and reheating hot springs water.

== History ==
In 1973 a hot springs resort was developed in Keomun village in the Bugok township (부곡면 거문리). Bugok In that year, after the natural hot springs was discovered under scenic Deokam Mountain (덕암산). The 48 geothermal wells that were discovered produce in one day an abundance of over 3,000 tons of hot springs well water. In 1977 Bugok was determined to be a national tourist attraction with high quality hotels, recreational facilities, parks and forestation. One of the most famous hotels is Bugok Hawaii, a resort-style hot springs facility with an amusement park.

== See also ==
- Changnyeong Town
