= Hwawangsan =

Mountain in South Korea

Hwawangsan 화왕산 火旺山

Highest point
- Elevation: 757 m (2,484 ft)
- Coordinates: 35°32′52″N 128°31′58″E

Geography
- Location: South Gyeongsang Province, South Korea

Geology
- Mountain type: Arête

Climbing
- First ascent: not recorded
- Easiest route: Hiking route 1

Korean name
- Hangul: 화왕산
- Hanja: 火旺山
- RR: Hwawangsan
- MR: Hwawangsan

Hwawangsan (Korean: 화왕산; Hanja: 火旺山) or Hwawang, is a mountain in Changnyeong County of South Gyeongsang Province, southeastern South Korea. It has an elevation of 757 metres.

== Etymology ==
The name Hwawang is from Korean hwawang 'energetic fire', from hwa (화; 火), meaning "fire", and wang (왕; 旺), meaning "vigorous".

The name originated from the fire festival and practice of burning dry weeds and rice fields that took place every year on January 15.

== Overview ==
It is one of the three primary tourist locations in Changnyeong County. On January 11, 1984, it was designated as a national park.

The ancient fortress Hwawangsanseong is located on the mountain.

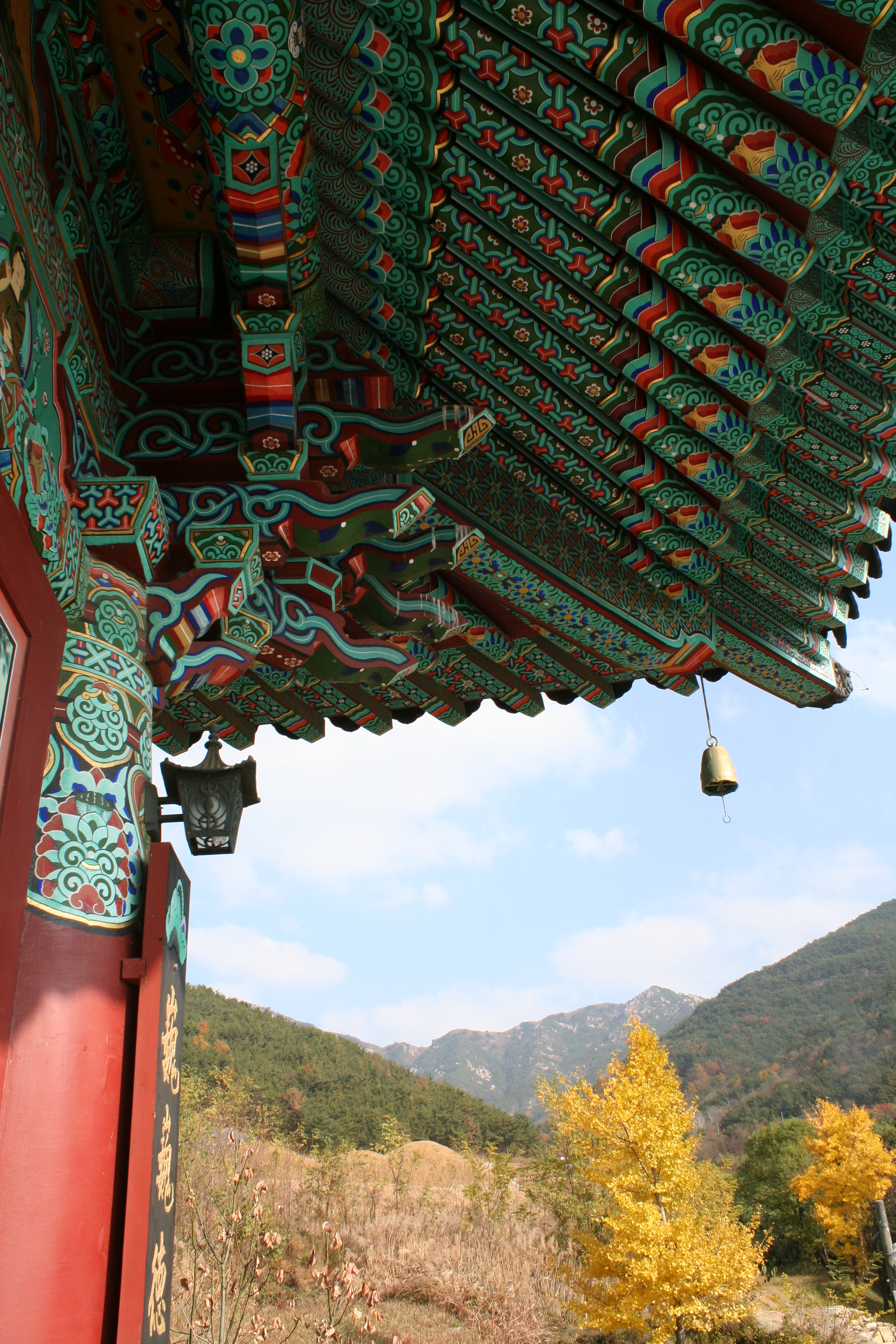
Changnyeong Temple at the base of Mount Hwawang

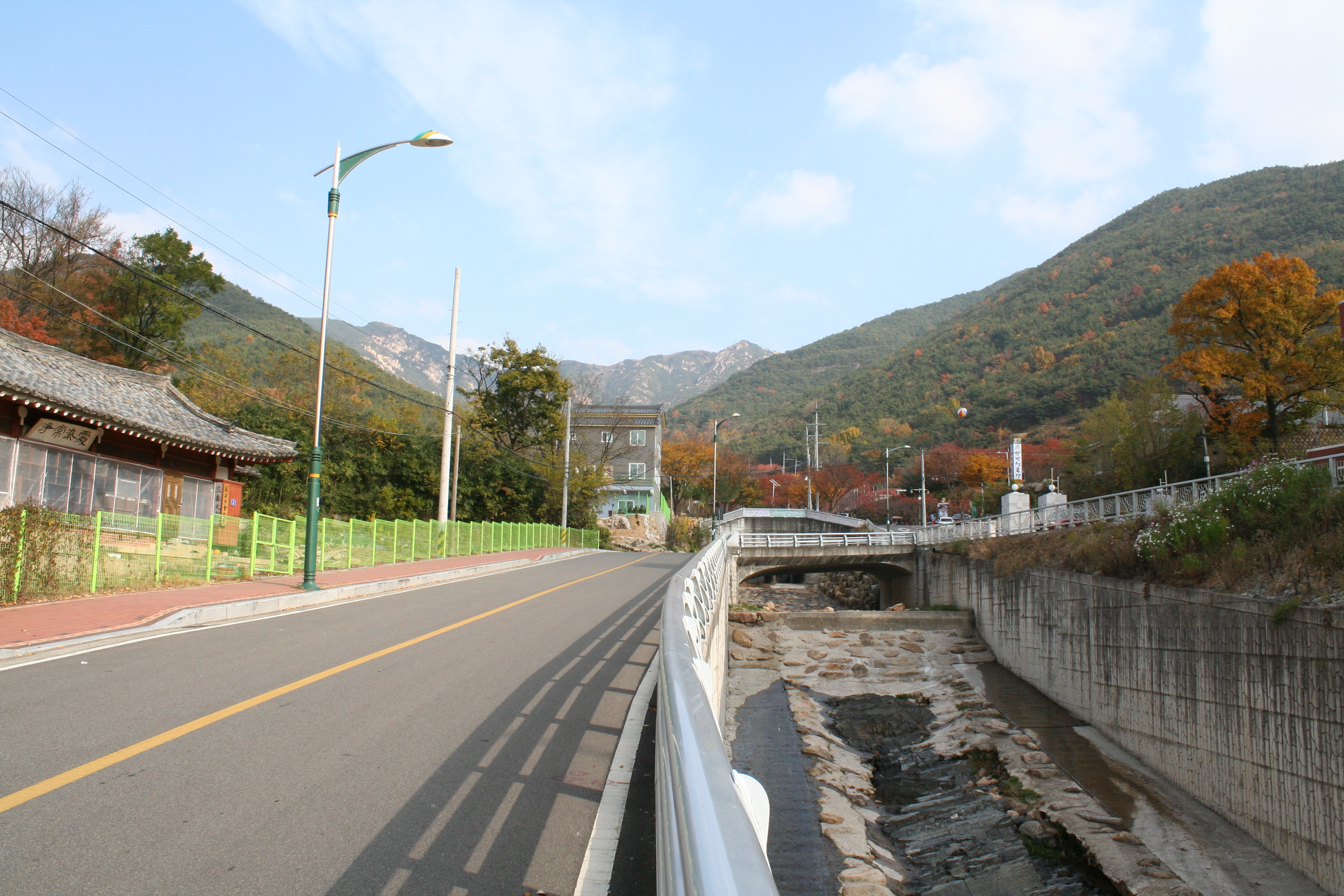
Road to Hwawangsang in Changnyeong

== See also ==
- List of mountains of Korea
- Changnyeong Town
