= Changnyeong County =

Coordinates: 35°32′40″N 128°29′32″E

Changnyeong
- County
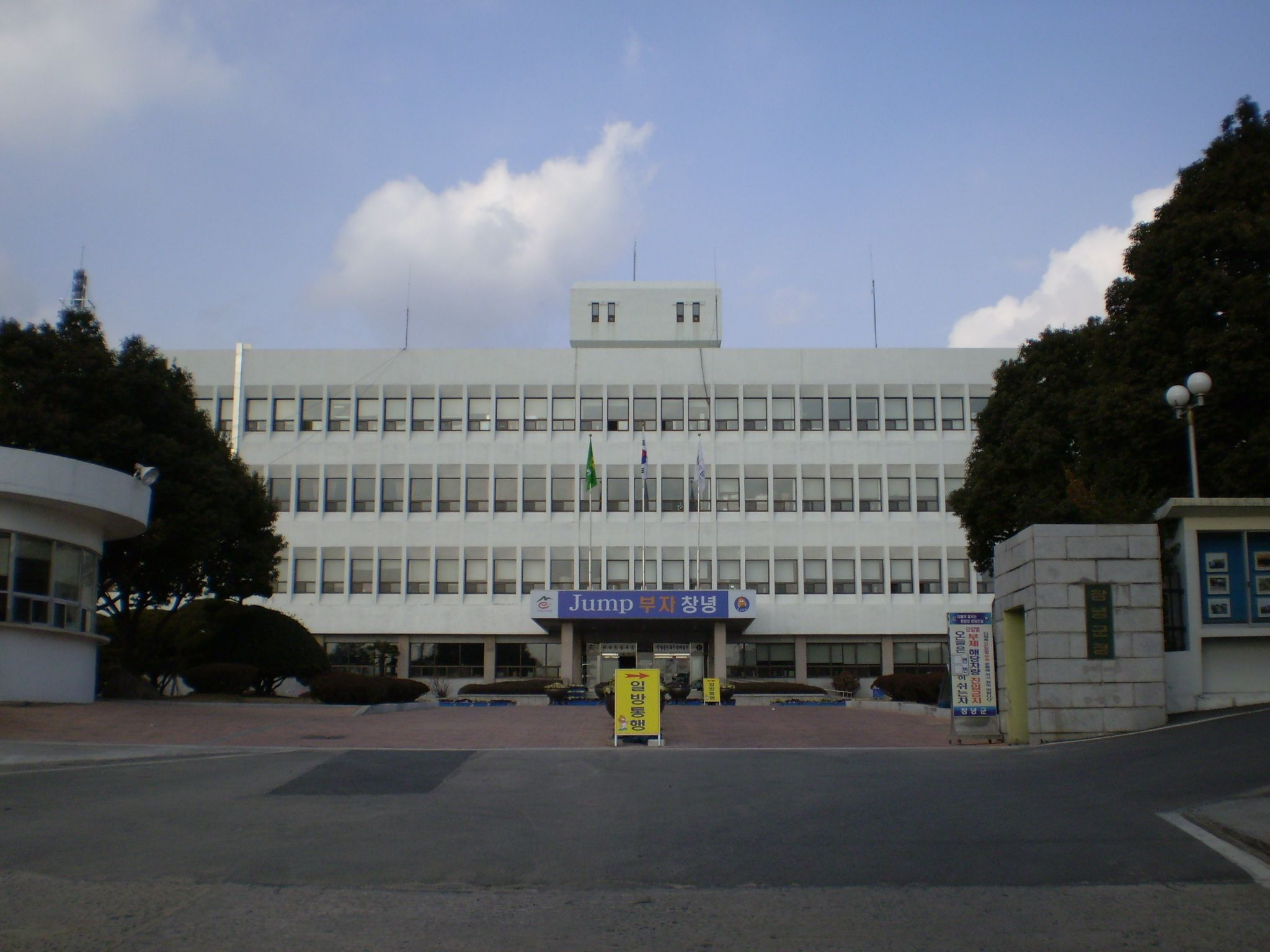
- Changnyeong County Hall

- Flag Emblem of Changnyeong

- Location in South Korea
- Country: South Korea
- Region: Yeongnam
- Administrative divisions: 2 Towns (읍 eup), 12 Townships (면 myeon)

Area
  - Total: 533.09 km^{2} (205.83 sq mi)

Population (September 2024)
  - Total: 56,246
  - Density: 140.1/km^{2} (363/sq mi)
  - Dialect: Gyeongsang

Korean name
- Hangul: 창녕군
- Hanja: 昌寧郡
- RR: Changnyeong-gun
- MR: Ch'angnyŏng-gun

Changnyeong County (Korean: 창녕군) is a county in South Gyeongsang Province, South Korea.

In the early Three Kingdoms period, Changnyeong was the seat of Bihwa Gaya, a member of the Gaya confederacy which was later conquered by Silla.

The Nakdong River flows through the county. The Upo wetland, an important ecological resource and tourist attraction, occupies a portion of the river basin.

The county government is located in Changnyeong Town (창녕읍), the largest town and center of the county.

Famous people from Changnyeong include North Korean actress Song Hye-rim and the former mayor of Seoul Park Won-soon.

== Etymology ==
Changnyeong means "prosperous peace", from the Sino-Korean roots chang (창; 昌; lit. '"prosperity"') and nyeong (녕; 寧; lit. '"peace"').

== History ==
Yeongsan territory (영산현) was established in 1631. In 1637, Changnyeong territory joined Yeongsan territory (창녕현·영산현). On May 24, 1895, the first day of fifth lunar month, Changnyeong and Yeongsan were incorporated under Daegu as separate counties (대구부 창녕군·영산군). On August 4, 1896, Changnyeong and Yeongsan county were incorporated into South Gyeongsang province (경상남도 창녕군·영산군). On April 1, 1914, Yeongsan County (영산군, 靈山郡) and Changnyeong county (창녕군) were merged into 15 townships (면) - Eubnae (읍내면), Goam (고암면), Seonsan (성산면), Daehap (대합면), Ibang (이방면), Yueo (유어면), Daeji (대지면), Changnak (창락면), Namgok (남곡면), Jangma (장마면), Bugok (부곡면), Yeongsan (영산면), Gilgok (길곡면), Docheon (도천면), Gyeseong (계성면). In 1918, Eupnae (읍내면) was renamed as Changnyeong (창녕면). On April 1, 1936, Namgok (남곡면) was renamed as Namji (남지면). On July 1, 1955, Changnak township (창락면) is merged with Changnyeong township (창녕면). (14면). On January 1, 1960, Changnyeong township became Changnyeong town. On January 1, 1963, Namji township became Namji town. In 1971, The local town hall of Namji was established.

== Administrative divisions ==
Changnyeong is made up of two towns (읍), 12 townships (면) 139 villages (리) over an area of 532.72 km^{2}. Of the 28,466 households and 61,789 people living in Changnyeong county in 2011 27.1% were living in Changnyeong town (창녕읍), 18.4% living in Namji town (남지읍).

Eup·Myeon	Korean	Hanja	Households	Population	Area	
Changnyeong-eup	창녕읍	昌寧邑	6,923	16,723	61.42	Changnyeong Township map
Namji-eup	남지읍	南旨邑	5,052	11,343	55.23	Changnyeong Township map
Goam-myeon	고암면	高岩面	1,116	2,001	44.48	Changnyeong Township map
Seongsan-myeon	성산면	城山面	871	1,598	47.03	Changnyeong Township map
Daehab-myeon	대합면	大合面	2,002	4,016	46.56	Changnyeong Township map
Ibang-myeon	이방면	梨房面	1,375	2,794	46.60	Changnyeong Township map
Yueo-myeon	유어면	遊漁面	1,029	1,980	33.29	Changnyeong Township map
Daeji-myeon	대지면	大池面	1,129	2,450	17.87	Changnyeong Township map
Kyeseong-myeon	계성면	桂城面	1,293	2,618	27.86	Changnyeong Township map
Yeongsan-myeon	영산면	靈山面	2,689	6,047	29.36	Changnyeong Township map
Jangma-myeon	장마면	丈麻面	1,010	1,925	29.99	Changnyeong Township map
Docheon-myeon	도천면	都泉面	1,357	2,848	25.45	Changnyeong Township map
Kilgok-myeon	길곡면	吉谷面	738	1,486	27.57	Changnyeong Township map
Bugok-myeon	부곡면	釜谷面	1,882	3,960	27.57	Changnyeong Township map

== Tourism ==
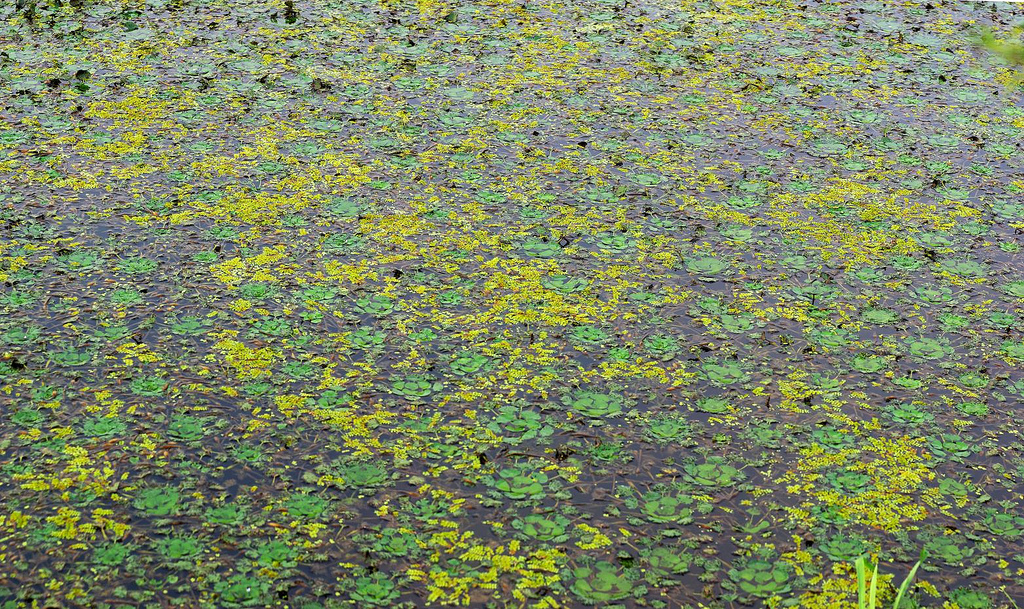
Upo Wetland

- Upo wetland (우포 늪)

Upo wetland in Changnyeong county is the largest wetlands in all of Korea. These wetlands are estimated to be created about 140 million years ago. It spreads out over Changnyeong county's Yueo, Ibang, Daehap, Daeji and other townships, covering over 2,310,000 m^{2}, with a circumference area of 7.5 km. There are over 340 species of endangered plants such as the Euryale ferox, as well as 62 wild birds, and 28 fish located within the swamp.

Upo wetland was designated as a natural monument during the time of Japanese occupation in 1933. As soon as the Cultural Properties Protection Law was enacted on December 3, 1962, the wetland was designated as Cultural property 15 under the name of Changnyeong Swan habitat. However, on July 19, 1973, it was found that migratory bird numbers had decreased and therefore its status as a natural monument was cancelled. After another evaluation done on January 13, 2001, in order to determine the geographical scenic value of the biology living there, it was determined that the wetlands be considered natural preserve area number 524.

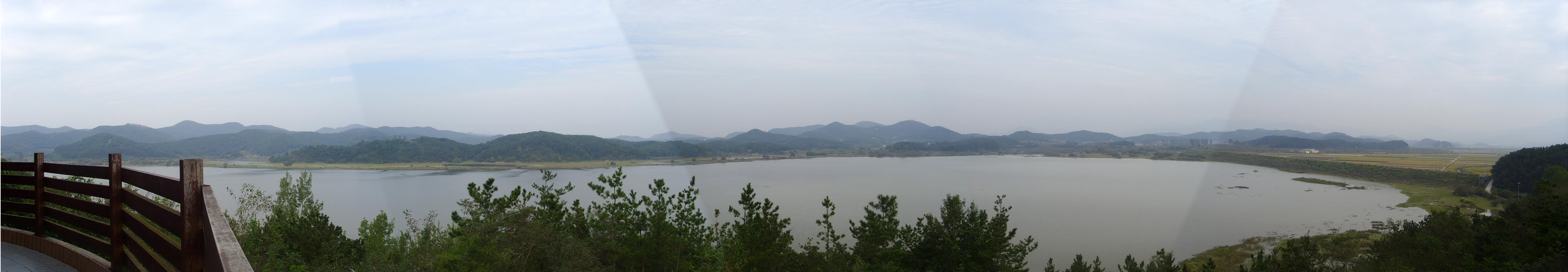
View overlooking the Upo wetlands

- Bugok Hot Springs (부곡온천)

In 1973 a hot spring resort was developed in Keomun village in the Bugok township (부곡면 거문리). In that year, after the natural hot springs was discovered under scenic Deokam Mountain (덕암산). The 48 geothermal wells that were discovered produce over 3,000 tons of water a day. In 1977년 Bugok was designated as a national tourist attraction with high quality hotels, recreational facilities, parks and forestation. One of the most famous hotel and spa is Bugok Hawaii, a resort style facility with a water and amusement park as well as a large hotel.

- Bugok Hawaii (부곡하와이)
- Mount Hwawang (화왕산)

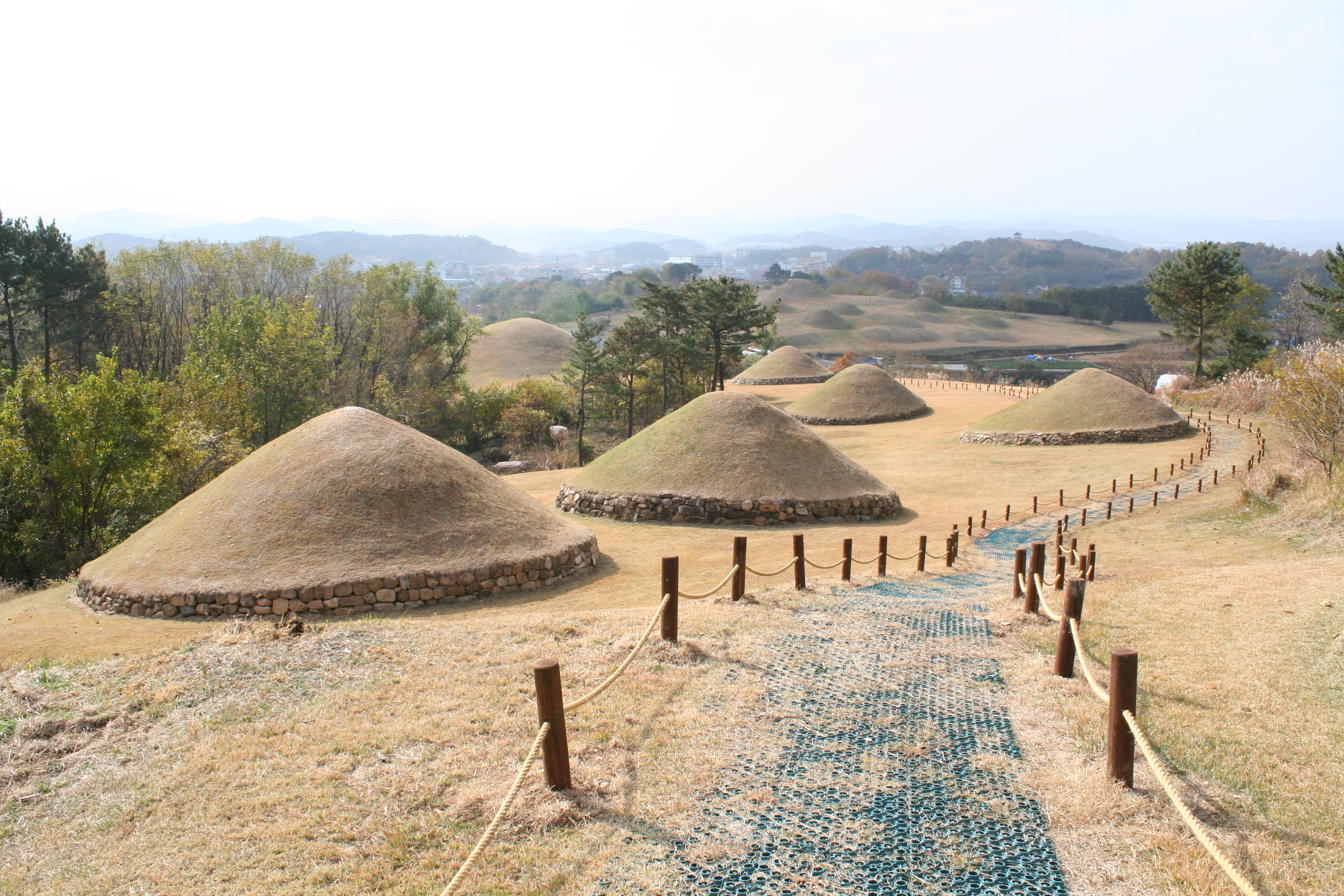
Ancient Royal graves (고분) in Changnyeong town

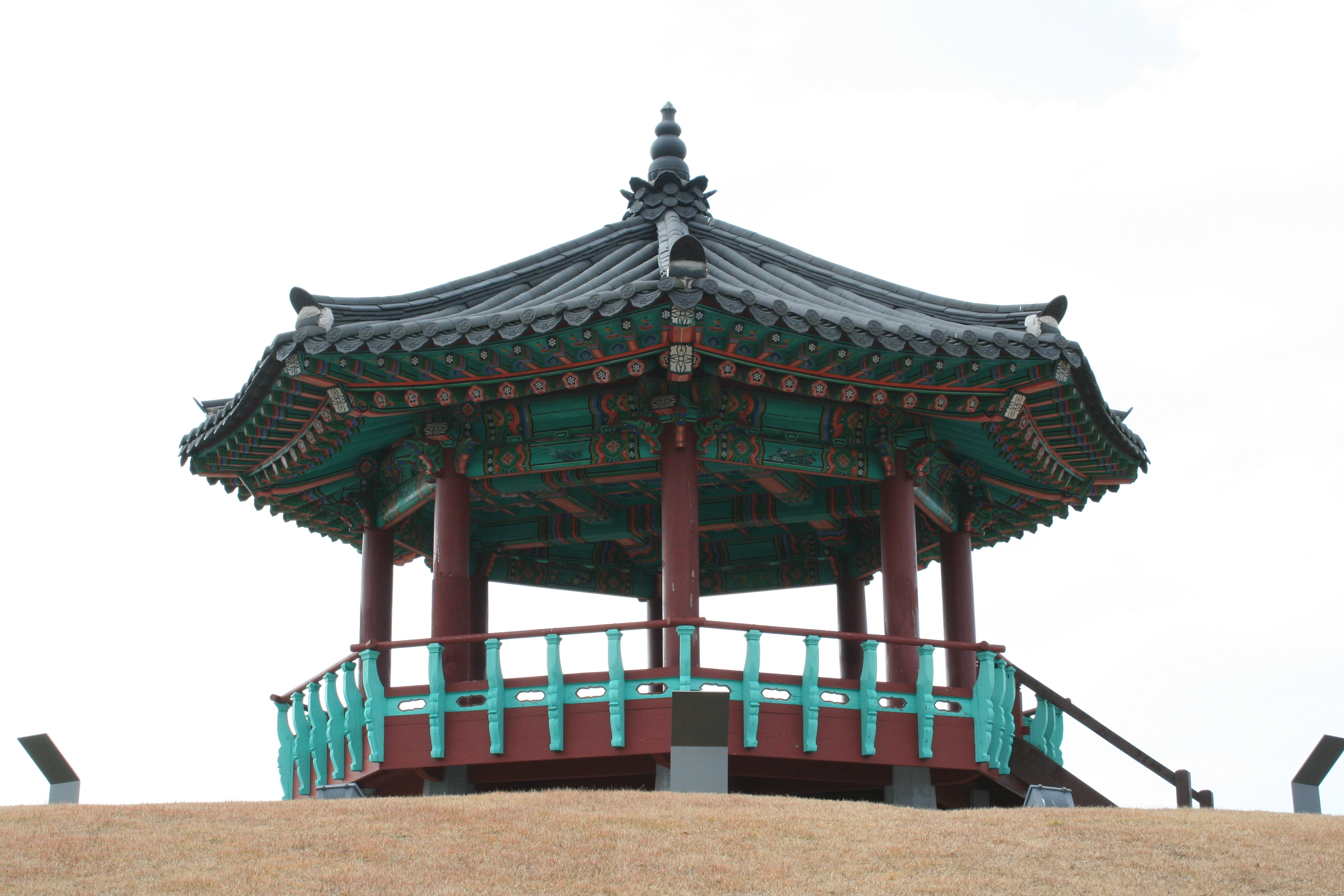
Pavilion in Changnyeong's main park with a view of the city.

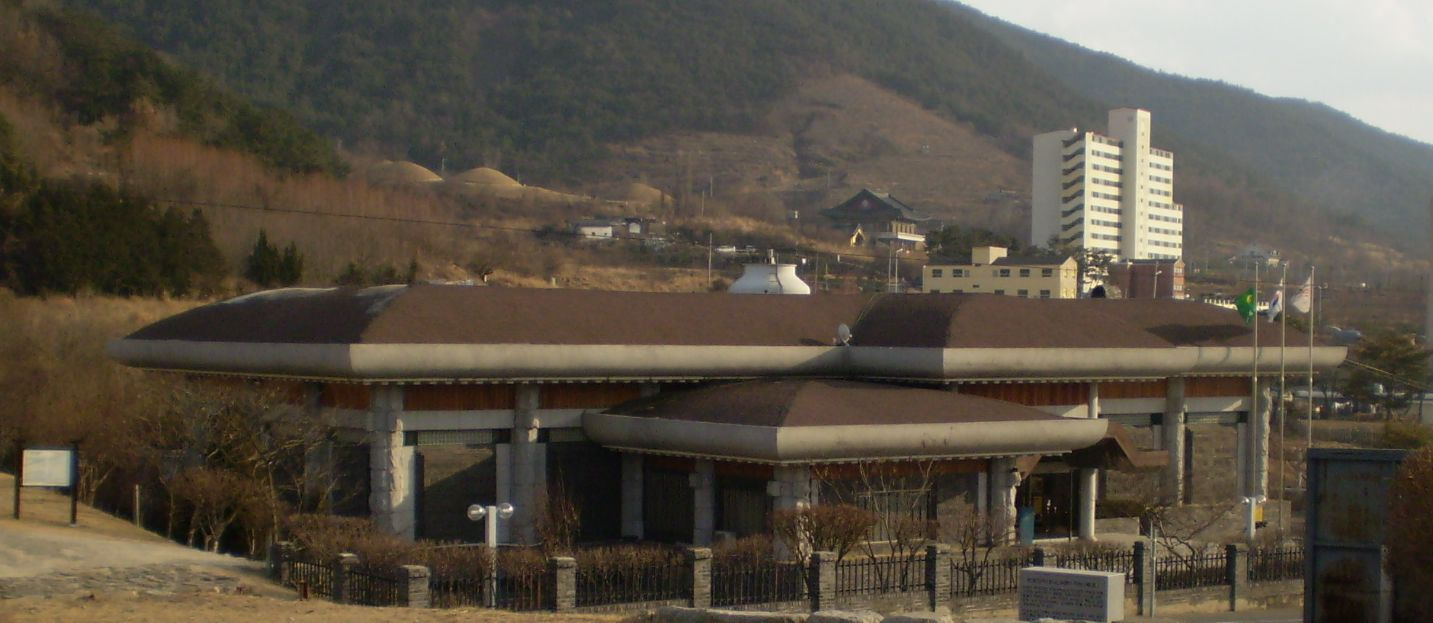
Changnyeong county History Museum located in Changnyeong town.

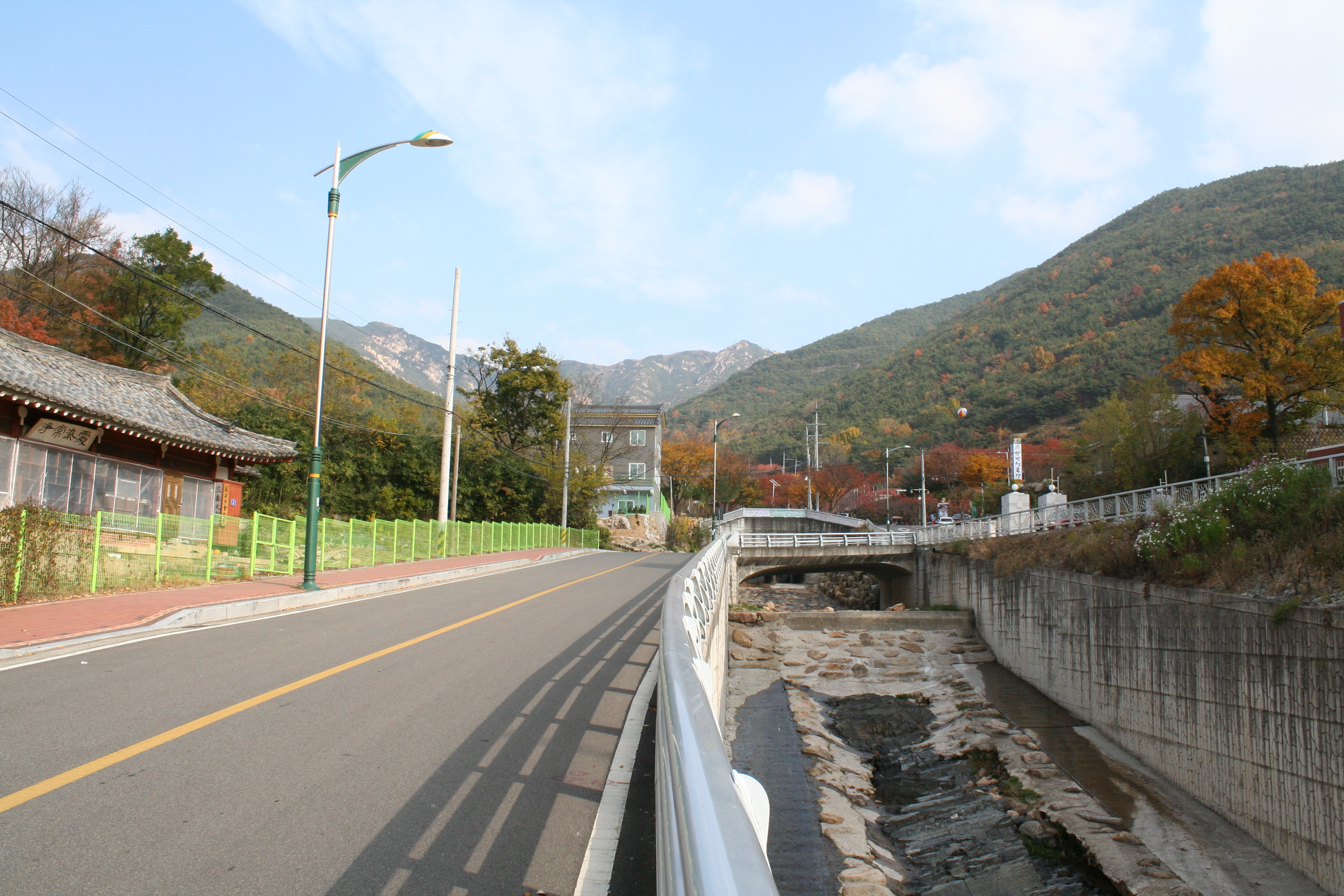
Road to Mount Hwawang (화왕산) in Changnyeong town

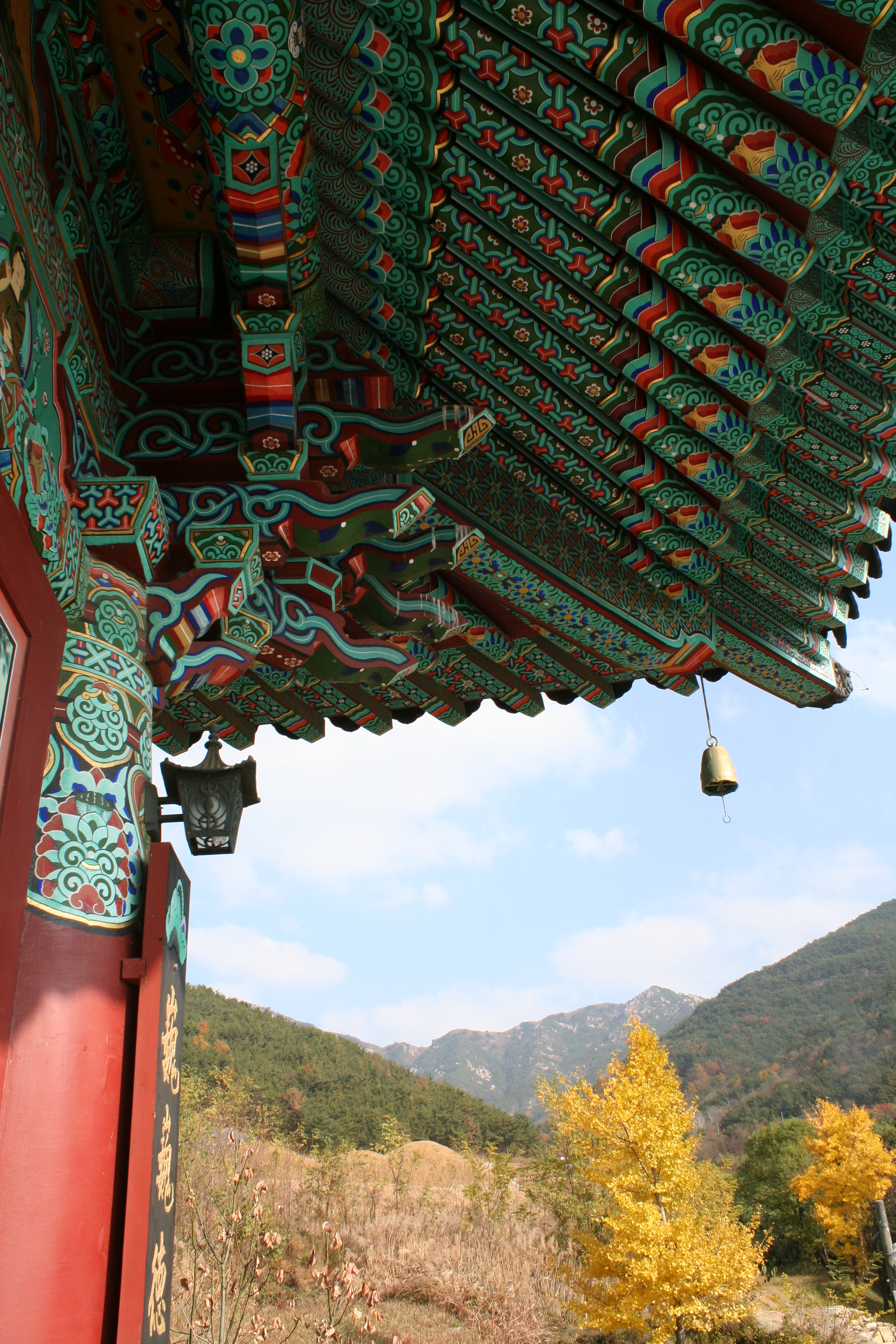
Changnyeong Temple at the base of Mount Hwawang

== Educational Institutions ==
High Schools (고등학교)

- Namji High and Middle School 남지고등학교
- Yeongsan High and Middle School 영산고등학교
- Changnyeong High School 창녕고등학교
- Changnyeong Technical High School 창녕공업고등학교
- Changnyeong Daeseong High School 창녕대성고등학교
- Changnyeong Girl's High School 창녕여자고등학교
- Changnyeong Ogya High and Middle School 창녕옥야고등학교
- Changnyeong First High and Middle School 창녕제일고등학교

Middle Schools (중학교)

- Namji Girl's Middle School 남지여자중학교
- Namji Middle School 남지중학교
- Daeseong Middle School 대성중학교
- Bugok Middle School 부곡중학교
- Seongsan Middle School 성산중학교
- Shinchang Girl's Middle School 신창여자중학교
- Yeongsan Middle School 영산중학교
- Changnyeong Girl's Middle School 창녕여자중학교
- Changnyeong Ogya Middle School 창녕옥야중학교
- Changnyeopng Middle School 창녕중학교

== Twin towns – sister cities ==
Changnyeong is twinned with:

- Sendai (Miyagi Prefecture), Japan
- Changwon, South Korea
- Sunchang, South Korea
- Gunpo, South Korea
- Shangzhi, China

== See also ==
- Geography of South Korea
- Yeongnam
- South Gyeongsang
- Upo wetland
- Bugok
- Mount Hwawang
