= Upo Wetland =

Swamp in South Gyeongsang, South Korea

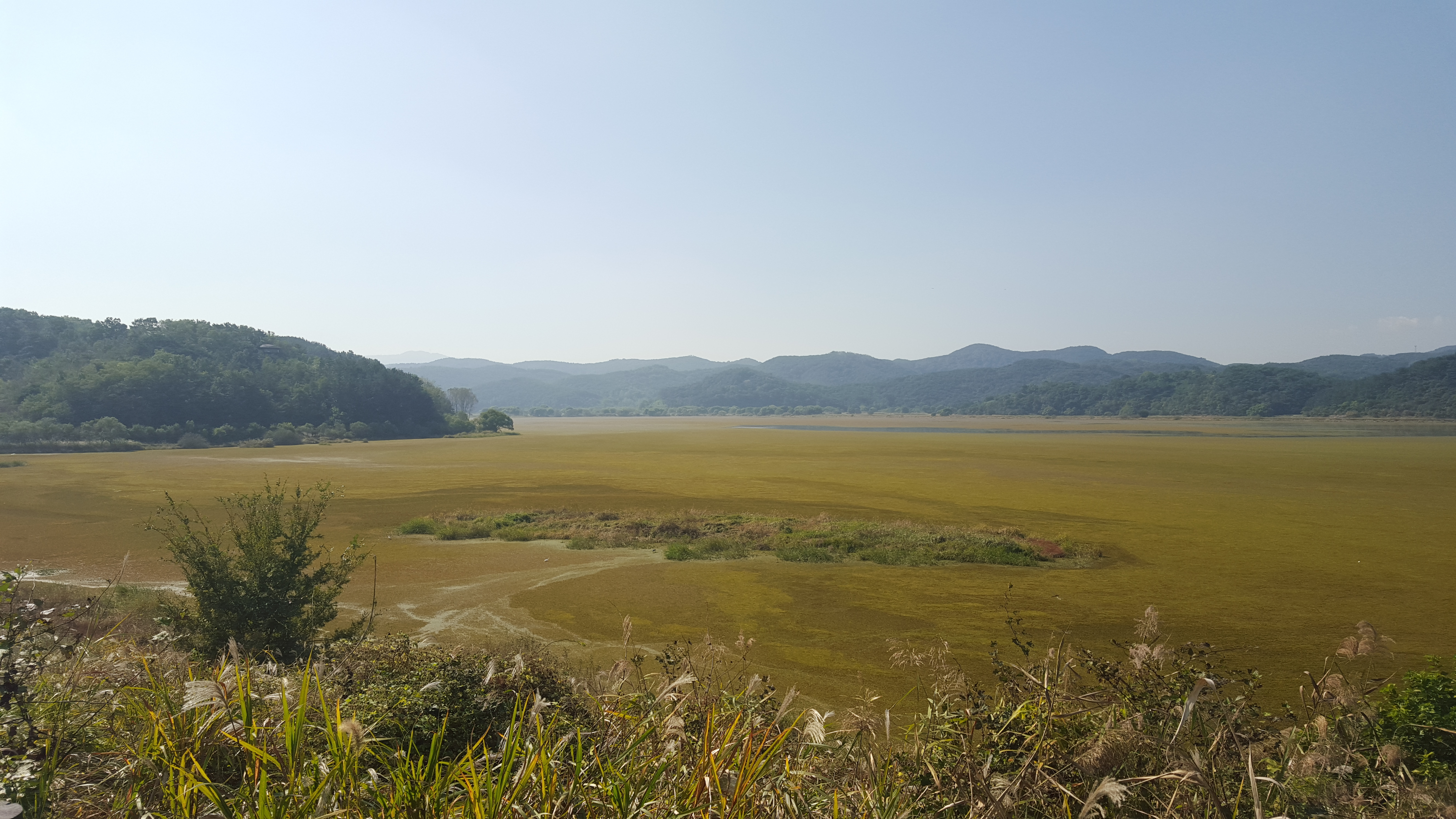
- Interactive map of Upo Wetland
- Location: Changnyeong County, South Gyeongsang Province, South Korea
- Coordinates: 35°33′N 128°25′E

Ramsar Wetland
- Designated: 2 March 1998
- Reference no.: 934

Korean name
- Hangul: 우포늪
- Hanja: 牛浦늪
- RR: Uponeup
- MR: Up'onŭp

Upo Wetland (Korean: 우포늪) is a complex of natural wetlands located in Changnyeong County, South Gyeongsang Province, South Korea. It is located in portions of Yueo-myeon, Ibang-myeon and Daehap-myeon, near the Nakdong River. It derives its name from the largest of the wetlands, Upo. Other wetlands in the complex include Mokpo, Sajipo and Jjokjibeol wetlands. The complex as a whole covers 2.13 km^{2}, and is the largest inland wetland in South Korea today. It is one of eight Ramsar wetlands in the country and one of the official visiting sites for the 10th Meeting of the Conference of the Contracting Parties that was held in Changwon, Korea in October, 2008.

== History ==
Most of Upo has been protected since 1997 and is now part of the Upo Ecological Park. However, agricultural and fishing activity still takes place on the wetland. A growing eco-tourism sector has developed in the country, although many local residents remain hostile to the idea of protected land.

== Environment ==
=== Flora and fauna ===
Upo is home to numerous endangered, threatened and rare species. Based on a 1997 survey, the wetland is believed to be home to a total of 342 endangered or threatened species: 168 species of plants, 62 species of birds, 55 species of arthropods, 28 species of fish, 12 species of mammals, 7 species of reptiles, 5 species of amphibians, and 5 species of molluscs. The most famous rare plant found here is the prickly lotus. A notable reptile species is the Reeves' turtle.

A particularly noted bird species is the black-faced spoonbill. Upo provides habitat to large numbers of migrant birds, including other rare species such as the white-naped crane and taiga bean goose. There is a restoration project to reintroduce the crested ibis to Upo. Last seen in 2003, the crested ibis is a symbol of Gyeongnam Province. The wetland has been designated an Important Bird Area (IBA) by BirdLife International because it supports significant populations of whooper swans, bean geese, falcated ducks, mallards, northern pintails, white-naped cranes and oriental storks.

== Community function ==
=== Upo Wetland Ecological Center ===
Established to facilitate the growing eco-tourism industry in South Korea, the center provides visitors with the opportunity to learn the importance of biodiversity and ecological preservation. An extensive history of the wetlands is on display as well as a number of other exhibits that pertain to the species that inhabit Upo. Constructed in 2007, approximately 150,000 people visit the center annually. Although the vast majority of the visitors are Korean, the Ecological Center provides brochures in English, Japanese and Chinese.

=== Habitat ===
Upo provides a habitat for a number of threatened and endangered species.

=== Flood and drought prevention ===
During the monsoon months of July and August, the wetlands act like a sponge to soak up the water and prevent flood damage to the surrounding agricultural areas. Throughout the year the wetlands also provide water during times of drought to the local rice and onion farmers.

=== Water purification ===
Plants such as the sweet flag and sangigarae feed on nutrients that normally cause water rot, keeping the water inside the wetland clean.

=== Food for the local community ===
Fish and plants provide the local community with a steady supply of food throughout the year. The crucian carp is a local delicacy and is very abundant throughout the wetland. During the fall harvest, locals collect water chestnuts from the floor of the wetland. In order to promote preservation, the Korean Ministry of Environment allows only thirteen local fish farmers to take fish from the wetlands. Local community members oppose the regulations, although through the center, an effort to invoke cooperation has been implemented.

=== Ecological and environmental education ===
The various plants and animals living in the wetland provide both educational and scientific opportunities. By teaching the public preservation and ecological sustainability, Upo Wetland directs the visitor's attention to developmental cooperation with the local community.

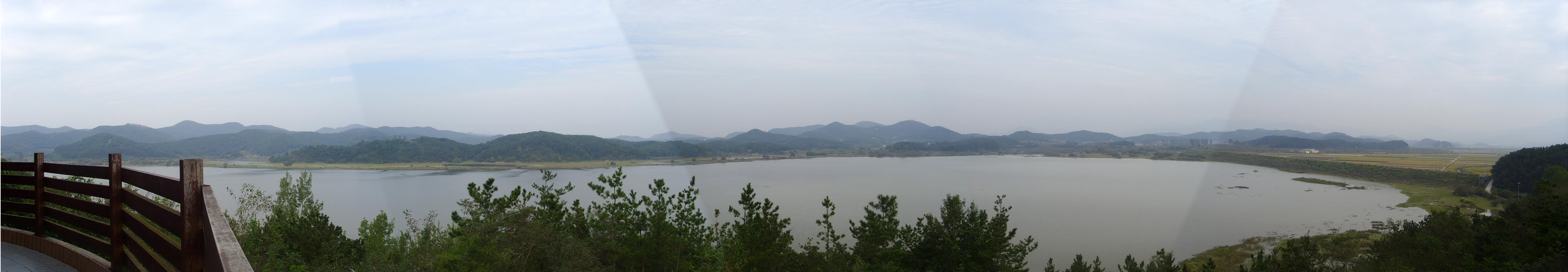
Upo Wetland

== Birds ==
Winter migratory birds	Summer migratory birds
Winter migratory birds comprise the greatest portion among migratory birds in the wetland throughout the year. Winter migratory birds fly south in October to avoid the severe cold weather after breeding in Arctic regions like Siberia during the fall and winter months. In Upo, birds designated as natural treasures can be easily found. Winter migratory birds include the white stork, Eurasian spoonbill, crane, swan and Eurasian teal.	In spring, common kingfishers, gallinules, white herons, little egrets, grey herons, etc., fly to Upo Wetland from the south to feed on the bountiful food and rely on Upo’s warming climate for ideal breeding conditions. Recently, more and more little egrets and grey herons have been found nesting in Upo Wetland and nearby.

Nonmigratory birds: Throughout the year a number of species remain in the wetland. Birds like the long-tailed tit, cinereous tit, vinous-throated parrotbill, oriental turtle dove and oriental magpie all stay throughout the year. Also some of the migratory birds have become sedentary due to the favorable conditions of Upo.

== Fish and shellfish ==
Upo provides a sanctuary for a number of different fish species, both native and invasive. Also the abundance of shellfish provide food for the larger animals occupying Upo.

Snakehead	This is a fish commonly found in the calm waters of a wetland with almost no wave movement. The snakehead is also referred to as the "tyrant of freshwater."
Crucian carp	Found throughout the wetland due to its highly adaptive nature, the crucian carp maintains an omnivorous diet of insects, shell fish, seeds, leaves, stalks of plants and other organic material.
Catfish	Catfish live in relatively shallow waters around the wetland that have low fluid speed and mud on the bottom. The catfish is nocturnal and feeds primarily on fry and small animals.
Rosy bitterling	A flat fish with a small mouth, the Rhodeus ocellatus can be found throughout the wetlands. During the breeding season the male's eyes, chest, abdomen and fins change colors to attract mates.
Fighting fish	As flat as a willow leaf and as common as the crucian carp, the fighting fish is frequently found in the upper stream of Topyeongcheon (stream) surrounded by a lot of water planets and slow moving water.
Rice paddy freshwater snail	Rice paddy freshwater snails can be found crawling on the muddy floor or living in the leaves or stalks of water chestnuts. The snails primarily feed on germs and bacteria in the mud, keeping the water of the wetland from getting rot.
Daechingi	Living on the floor of the wetland like the rice paddy freshwater snail, the daechingi is a kind of clam that has suffered a decline in its population due to increased pollution.
Mussel	The mussel has a thick, large, black shell, easily distinguishable from similar species by a growth vein and a distinctively dark brown ligament.
Freshwater snail	Slightly longer than the rice paddy freshwater snail, the freshwater snail filters out mud by moving as though it were painting a picture.

== Plants ==
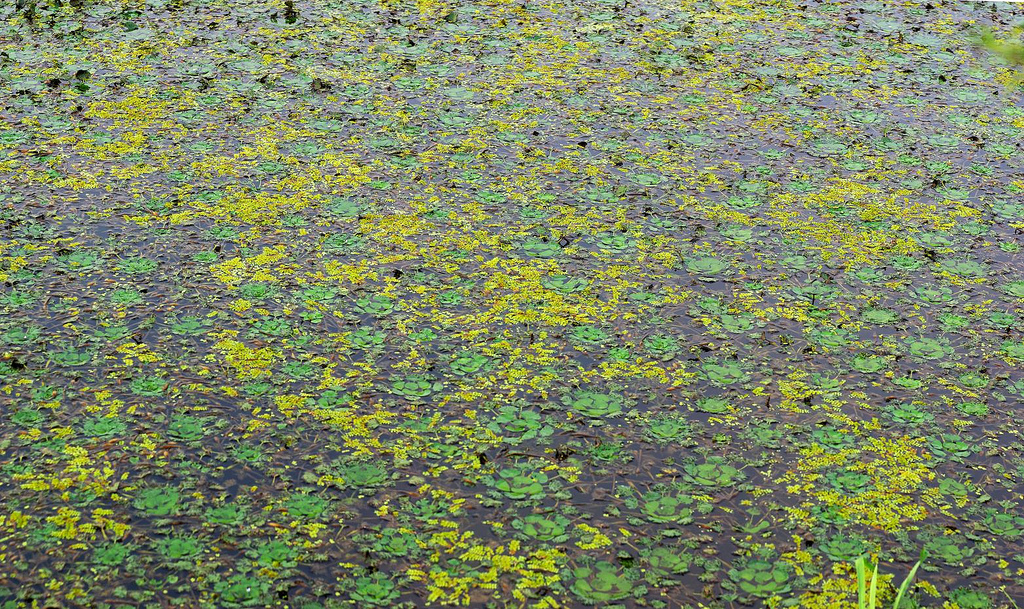

=== Plants growing at the waters edge ===
- Pampas grass
- Cattail
- Sweet flag
- Wild rice

=== Plants with leaves above the water ===
- Water chestnut
- Water lotus
- Bladderwort

=== Underwater plants ===
- Eelgrass

=== Plants floating on the water ===
- Duckweed
- Frogbit grass

== Water insects and crustaceans ==
- Diving beetle: Both the larva and adult diving beetle, also referred to as an underwater cleaner, are carnivorous. The adult diving beetle emerges from the moist earth from hibernation and pupation.
- Mulijarus japonicus: The Mulijarus japonica carries eggs on its back and can easily be found in the waters around many plants like wild rice and club rush. Also called the snapping turtle, it is one of the most prominent water insects in Upo Wetland.
- Water strider: The water strider is most easily found on the surface of the water moving like it is skating on the top of the water, using the thin hairs of its legs.
- Gaeajaebi: The gaeajaebi lives in the lakes of the wetland feeding on small fish and insects.
- Horn dragonfly: The adult horn dragonfly lives on land, while most of the larvae reside in the water of the wetland. The larvae feed on small insects such as mosquitoes.
- Damselfly: The damselfly lays its eggs by inserting the egg-laying pipe into the stalks or leaves in the water plants and end up spending the majority of its youth in the water.
- Water scorpion: The water scorpion is found primarily at the edge of the wetland. A reclusive hunter, it hides in the leaves waiting for its prey to pass.
- Long tailed helmet shrimp: Introduced to the wetland from Central America, the long tailed helmet shrimp is not frequently found in Upo Wetland. Although in the surrounding area the long tailed helmet shrimp is commonly found in the rice paddies usually right after the seasonal flooding. White storks and egrets are usually found prowling the rice fields looking for these small shrimp.

== See also ==
- Geography of South Korea
