= South Gyeongsang Province =

Province of South Korea

- Province
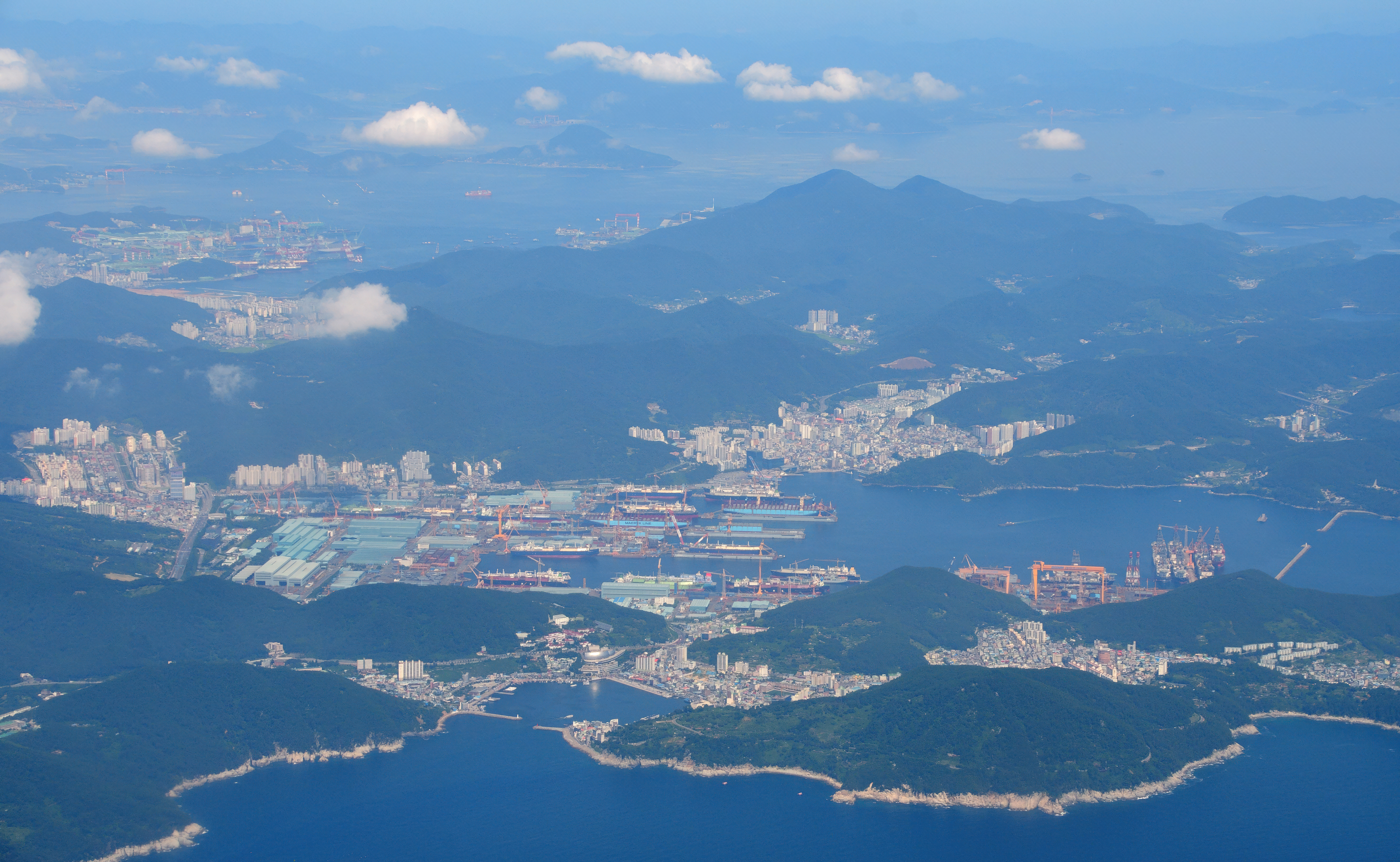
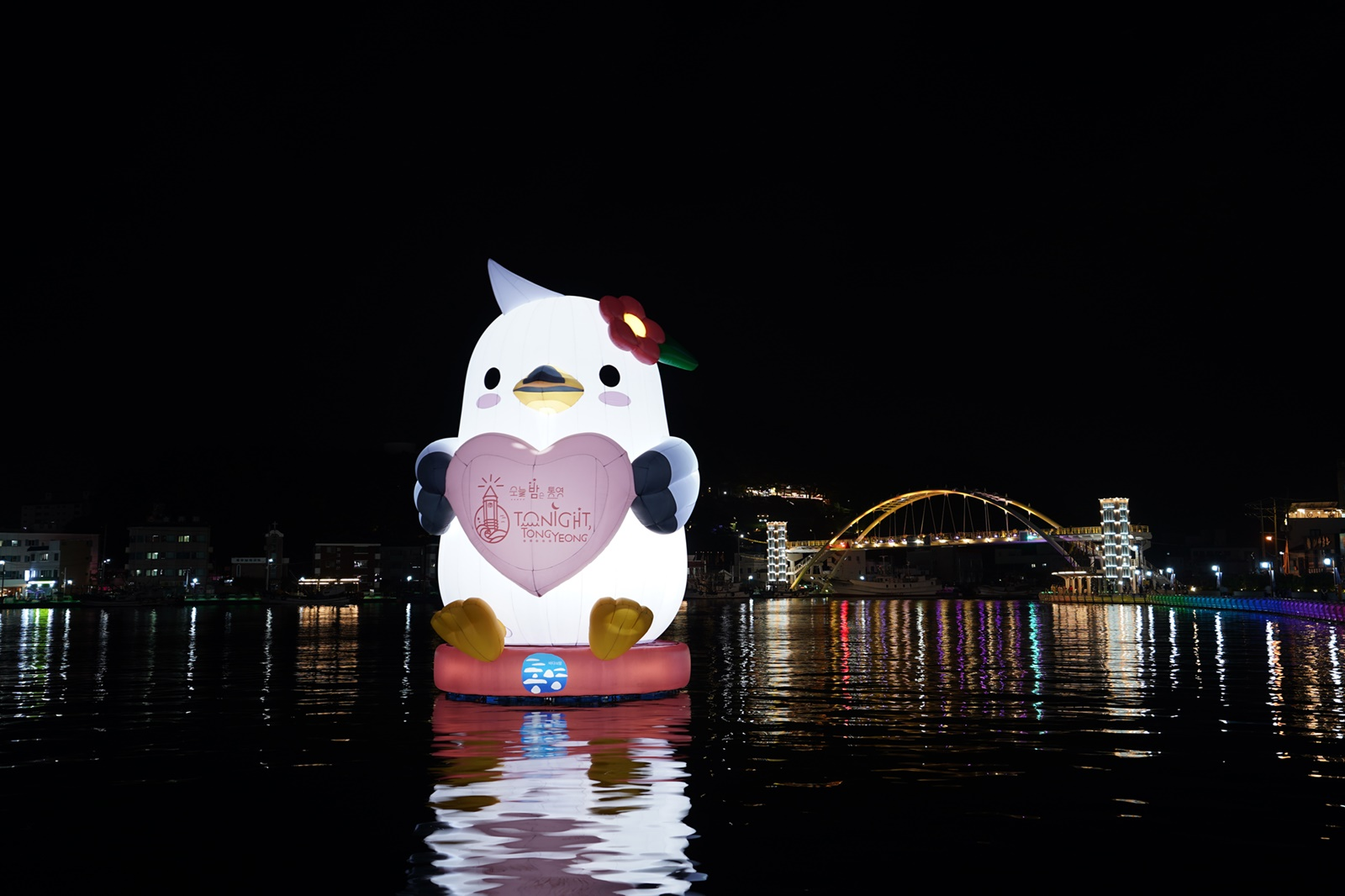
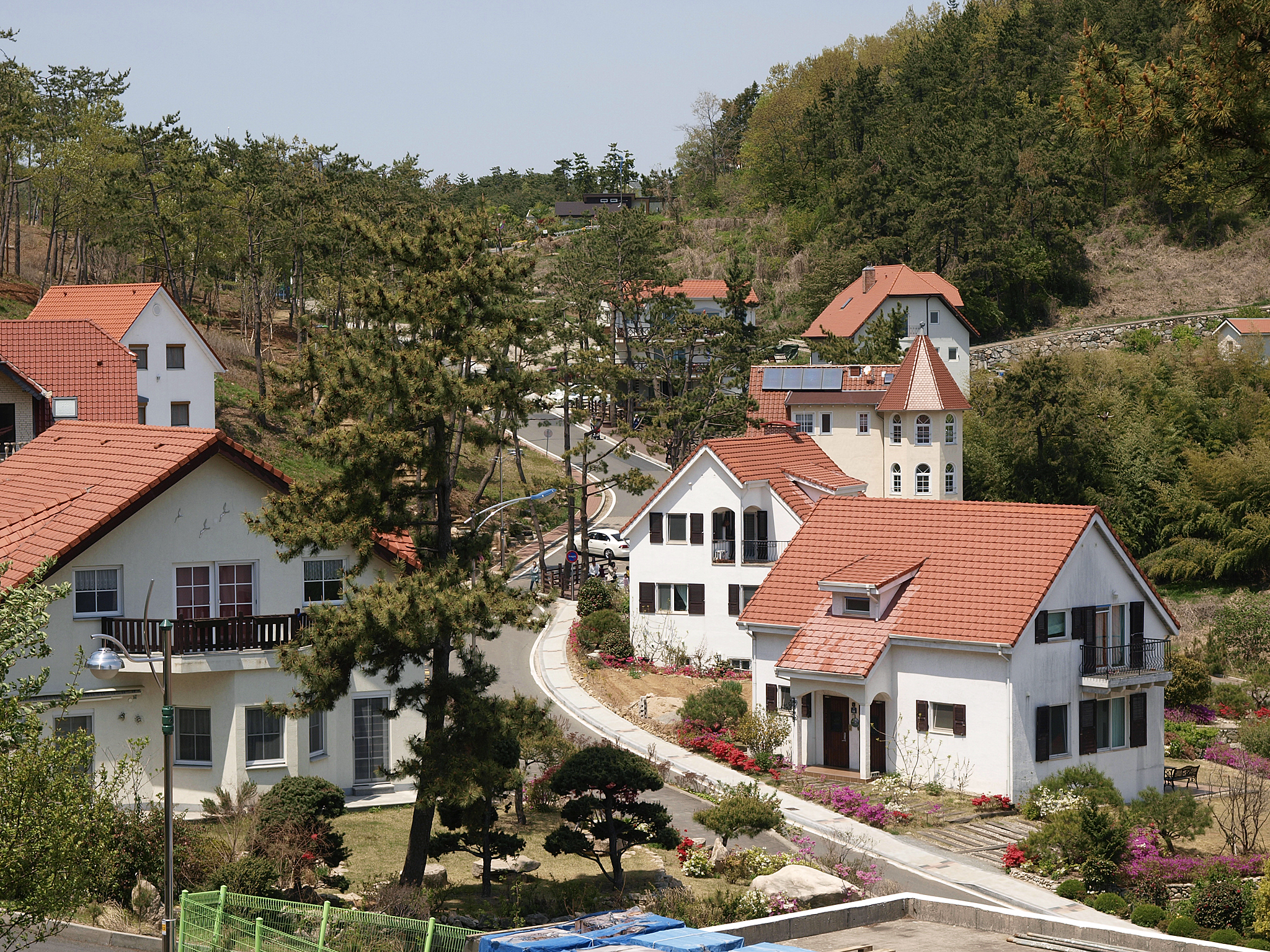
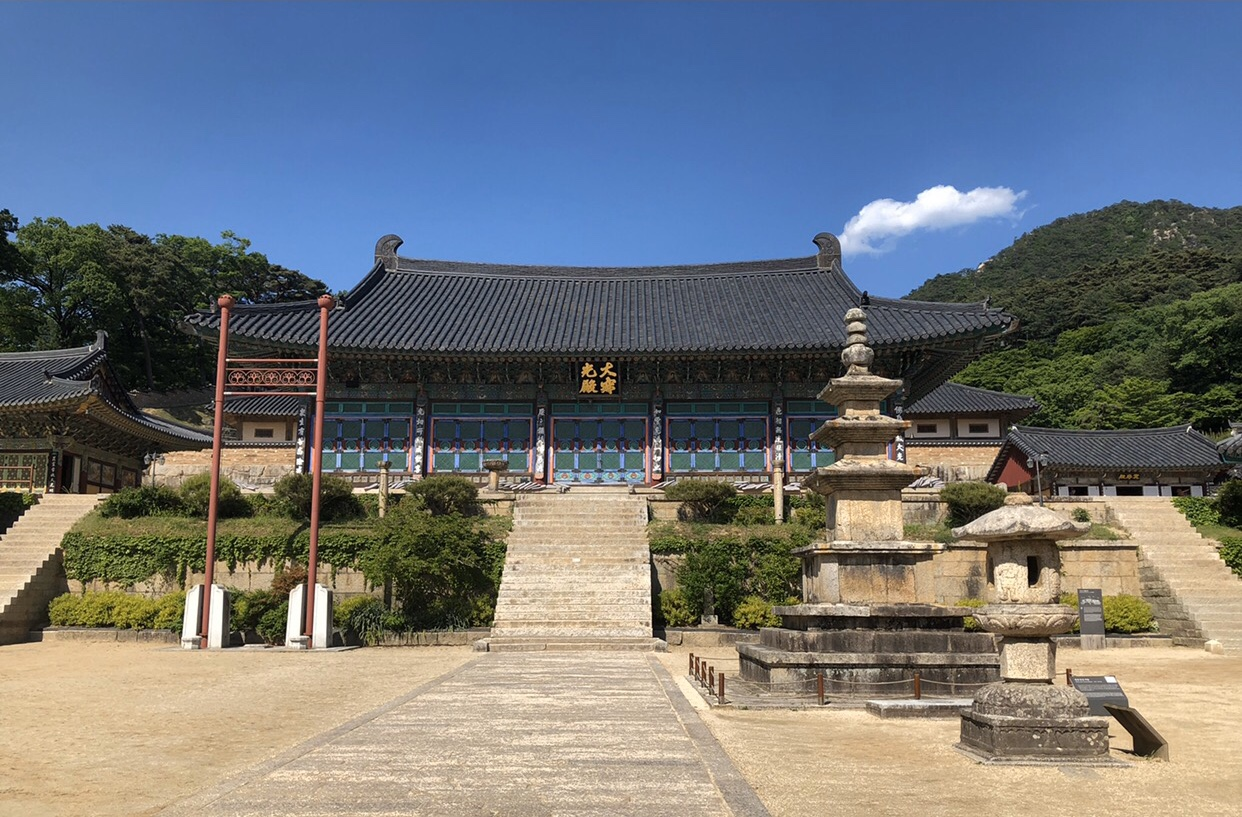
- Geoje Tongyeong Namhae County Hapcheon

- Flag Logo

- Coordinates: 35°15′N 128°15′E
- Country: South Korea
- Region: Yeongnam
- Capital: Changwon
- Subdivisions: 8 cities; 10 counties

Government
  - Governor: Park Wan-su (PP-SG)

Area
  - Total: 10,533 km^{2} (4,067 sq mi)
  - Rank: 4th

Population (December 2018)
  - Total: 3,447,687
  - Rank: 2nd
  - Density: 327.86/km^{2} (849.2/sq mi)
- Demonym: Gyeongnamian

GDP (Nominal, 2023)
  - Total: KRW 138 trillion (US$ 110 billion)
  - Per capita: US$ 36,501
- ISO 3166 code: KR-48
- Dialect: Gyeongsang
- Website: Official website (English)

Korean name
- Hangul: 경상남도
- Hanja: 慶尙南道
- RR: Gyeongsangnam-do
- MR: Kyŏngsangnam-do

Short name
- Hangul: 경남
- Hanja: 慶南
- RR: Gyeongnam
- MR: Kyŏngnam

South Gyeongsang Province (Korean: 경상남도; Korean pronunciation: [kjʌŋ.saŋ.nam.do]), also known as Gyeongnam (경남), is a province in the southeast of South Korea. The provincial capital is at Changwon. It is adjacent to the major metropolitan center and port of Busan. The UNESCO World Heritage Site Haeinsa, a Buddhist temple that houses the Tripitaka Koreana and tourist attraction, is located in this province. Automobile and petrochemical factories are largely concentrated along the southern part of the province, extending from Ulsan through Busan, Changwon, and Jinju.

== Etymology ==
The name derives from Korean Gyeongsang 'joyous furthermore'; from gyeong (Korean 경, Hanja 慶) 'celebrate' and sang (Korean 상, Hanja 尚) 'append to'. The name derives from the names of the principal cities of Gyeongju (경주; 慶州) and Sangju (상주; 尙州).

== History ==
=== Joseon ===
In 1407, for military purposes, the administrative districts were reorganized, with Gyeongsang-do being divided into Gyeongsangjwa-do (or Gyeongsangjwa Province; left) and Gyeongsangwu-do (or Gyeongsangwu Province; right) as the reference points of the Nakdong River.

Before 1895, the area corresponding to modern-day South Gyeongsang Province was part of Gyeongsang Province, one of the Eight Provinces of Korea during the Joseon dynastic kingdom. In 1895, southern Gyeongsang was replaced by the districts of Jinju in the west and Dongnae (modern-day Busan) in the east. In 1896, they were merged to form South Gyeongsang Province.

=== Today ===
The provincial capital was originally in Jinju; it moved to Busan in 1925. During Imperial Japanese colonial rule, it was known as Keishōnan Province.

In 1948, South Gyeongsang became part of South Korea. In 1963, Busan separated from South Gyeongsang Province to become a Directly Governed City (Jikhalsi). In 1983, the provincial capital moved from Busan to Changwon. In 1995, Busan became a Metropolitan City (Gwangyeoksi), and Ulsan separated from South Gyeongsang Province to become a Metropolitan City in 1997.

== Geography ==
The province is part of the Yeongnam region, on the north by North Gyeongsang Province, on the west by North Jeolla Province and South Jeolla Province, and on the south by the Korea Strait far from Nagasaki Prefecture, Japan. Most of the province is drained by the Nakdong River and its tributaries. The total area of the province is 10,533 square kilometres (4,067 sq mi).

The tail of the Taebaek Mountains reaches the east of the Province, and the Nakdong River flows in the middle of the mountain range. The Province is bordered by the Sobaek Mountains and Honam to the west. The central lowland spreads along the Nakdonggang River basin. The Nakdonggang River is collecting tributaries of Gyeongsangnam-do to develop the Gimhae Delta Plain near the downstream. Jirisan, Deogyusan, and Bagunsan are lined up in the west.

== Demographics ==
Historical population
Year	Pop.	±% p.a.
1980	2,689,376	—
1990	2,810,194	+0.44%
2000	2,978,502	+0.58%
2010	3,160,154	+0.59%
2015	3,334,524	+1.08%
2020	3,333,056	−0.01%
Source: Citypopulation

Religion in South Gyeongsang Province (2024)
1. Not religious (48.0%)
2. Buddhism (29.0%)
3. Protestantism (14.0%)
4. Catholicism (7.00%)
5. Others (2.00%)

== Resources ==
The Nakdong delta plain around Gimhae is one of the best granaries in South Korea. Agricultural products form Gyeongsangnam-do include rice, beans, potatoes, and barley. The area is renowned for its cotton, sesame, and fruits which are grown along the southern seaside. A number of marine products are caught. The province is one of the country's leading fisheries.

== Major cities ==
Largest cities in South Gyeongsang Province Citypopulation
Rank		Pop.
1	Changwon	1,029,389
2	Gimhae	552,427
3	Jinju	352,403
4	Yangsan	351,206
5	Geoje	246,965
6	Tongyeong	127,984
7	Sacheon	111,184
8	Miryang	103,228
9	Haman	65,279
10	Geochang	59,595

The largest cities in the region are Busan and Ulsan, which are separately administered as provincial-level Metropolitan Cities. Apart from the capital Changwon, other large or notable cities include Gimhae and Jinju.

== Attractions ==
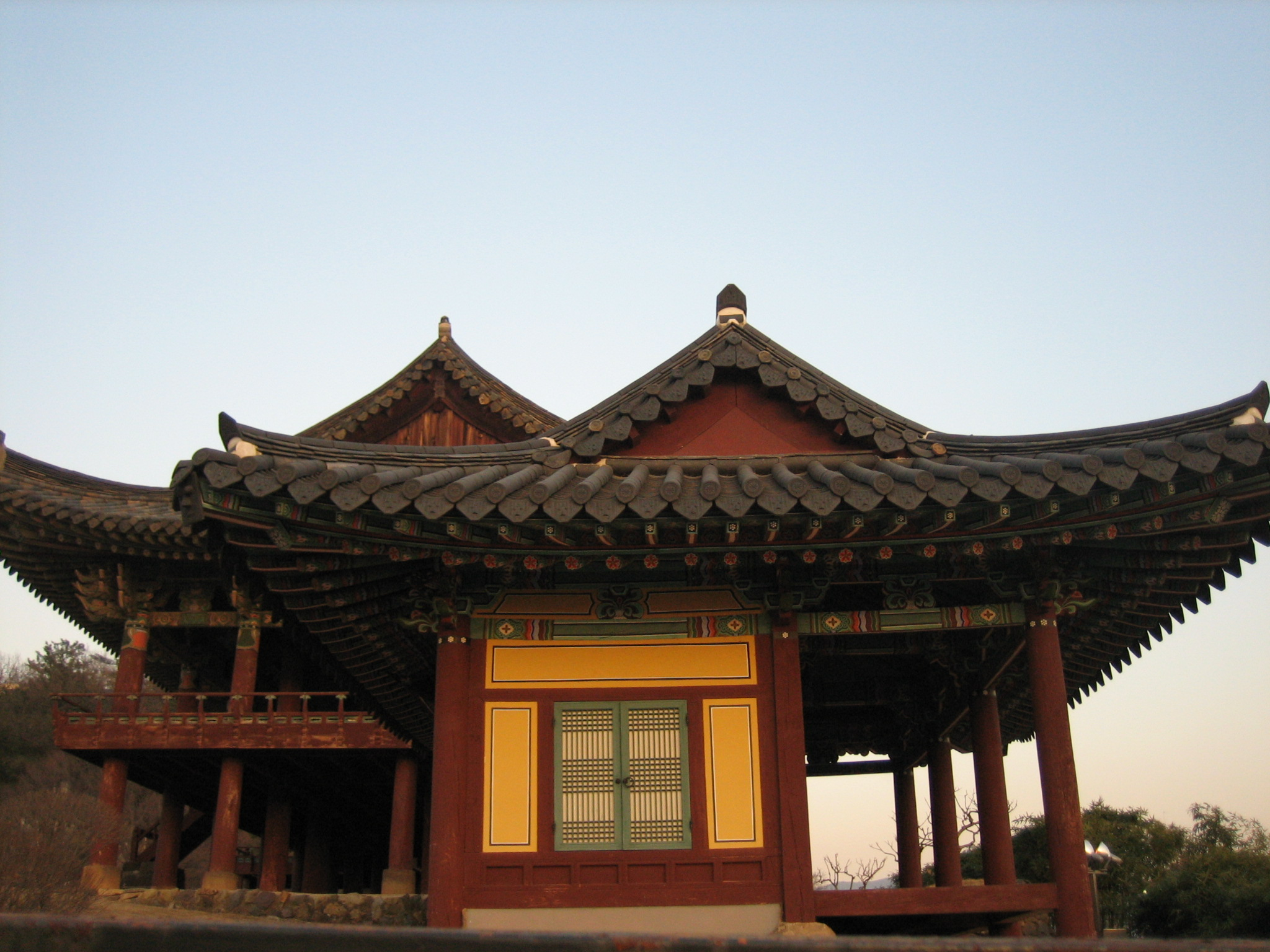
Yeongnamnu in Miryang, South Gyeongsang Province. A pavilion from the Joseon.

Gyeongsangnam-do is the home of Haeinsa, a Buddhist temple that houses the Tripitaka Koreana and attracts many tourists. It is in the national park around Jirisan (1,915 m) on the border with Jeollabuk-do. The temple was first built in 802.

Changnyeong County contains three major tourist attractions for the province: Upo Wetland, the natural hotsprings of Bugok, and Hwawangsan.

Yangsan-si contains two major temples for the province: Tongdosa and Naewon Temple

== Culture ==
=== Festival ===
Beginning in 2002, the Tongyeong International Music Festival is one of the most important music events in Asia. Held every spring, the festival consists of stages from well-known classical music figures and aspiring musicians. It aims to foster young composers and performers.

Jinhae Naval Port Festival, one of the biggest cherry blossom festivals in South Korea, is held in Jinhae.

The Haman Water Fireworks Festival takes place around Buddha's Birthday in April every year. It is one of the cultures that has existed since the Joseon Dynasty. It originated from the heart of praying for peace in the country.

== Tourism ==
The Jinju National Museum opened in 1984 as the first national museum in South Gyeongsang Province. Visitors can experience cultural heritages in the Province, including Gaya.

Haeinsa, one of Korea's top three temples, was built in 802 by two monks Seung-woon and Lee Jung. The temple houses various treasures along with Woodblocks of national treasures, including the Tripitaka Koreana and Janggyeong Panjeon.

Destination

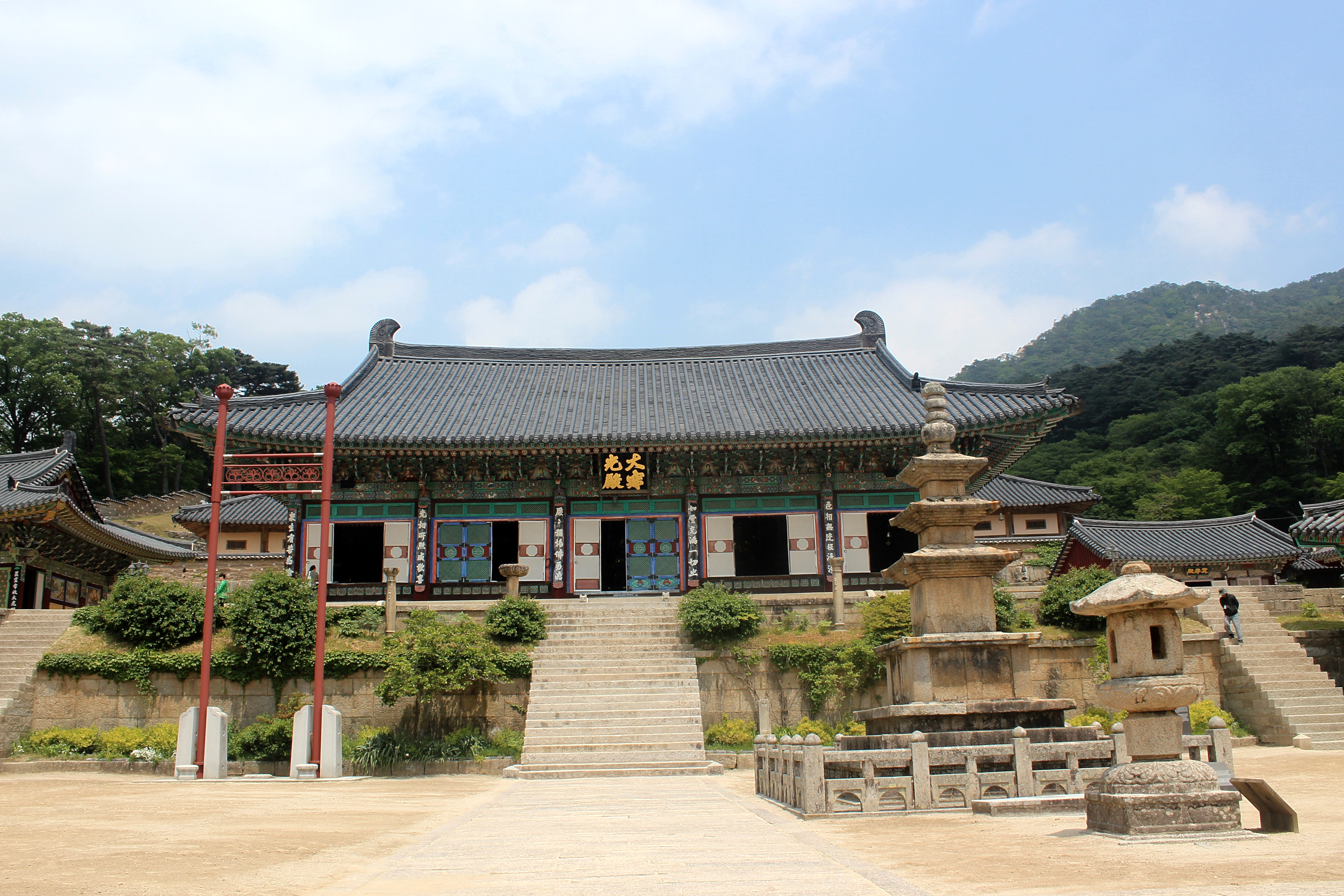
Haeinsa

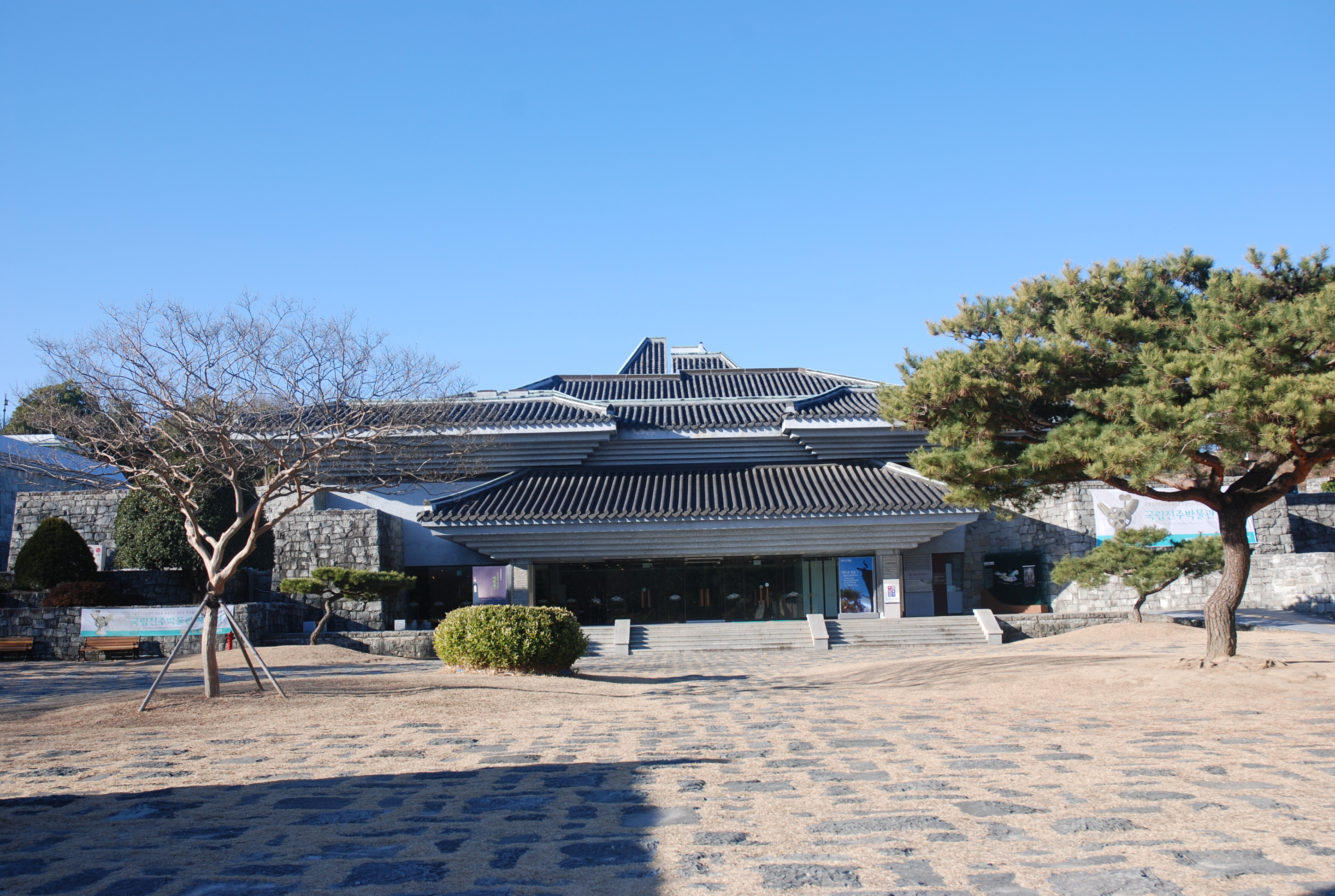
Jinju National Museum

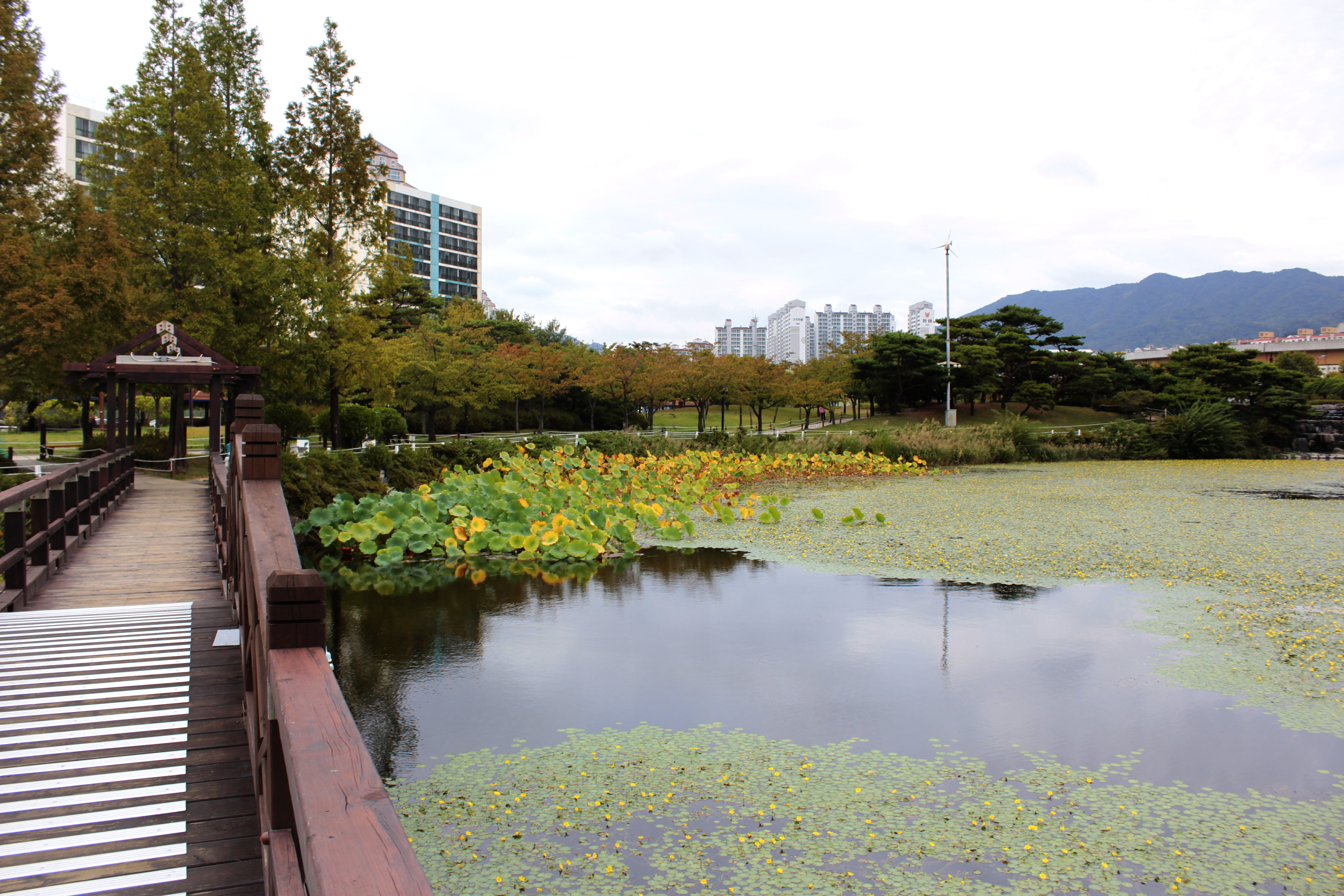
Yeonji Park in Gimhae

== Economy ==
The province accounts for 43% of the national space industry production, and is home to Korea Aerospace Industries and Hanwha Aerospace, as well as 125 industrial complexes. The National Aerospace Industrial Complex is currently being developed, with completion targeted for June 2025.

The shipyards of Geoje are one of the largest shipyards in the world and host shipbuilders such as Samsung Heavy Industries

== Administrative divisions ==
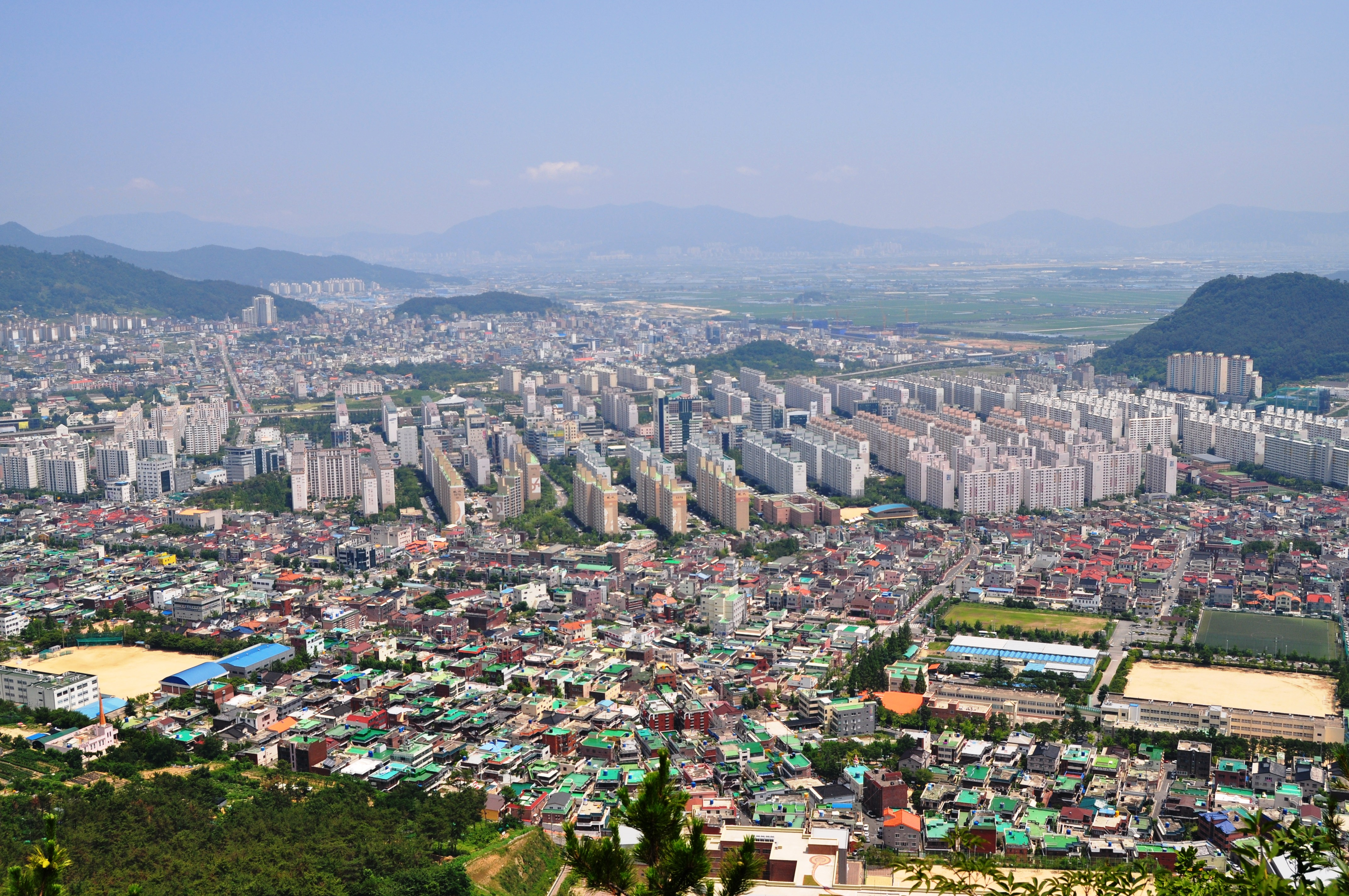
Gimhae

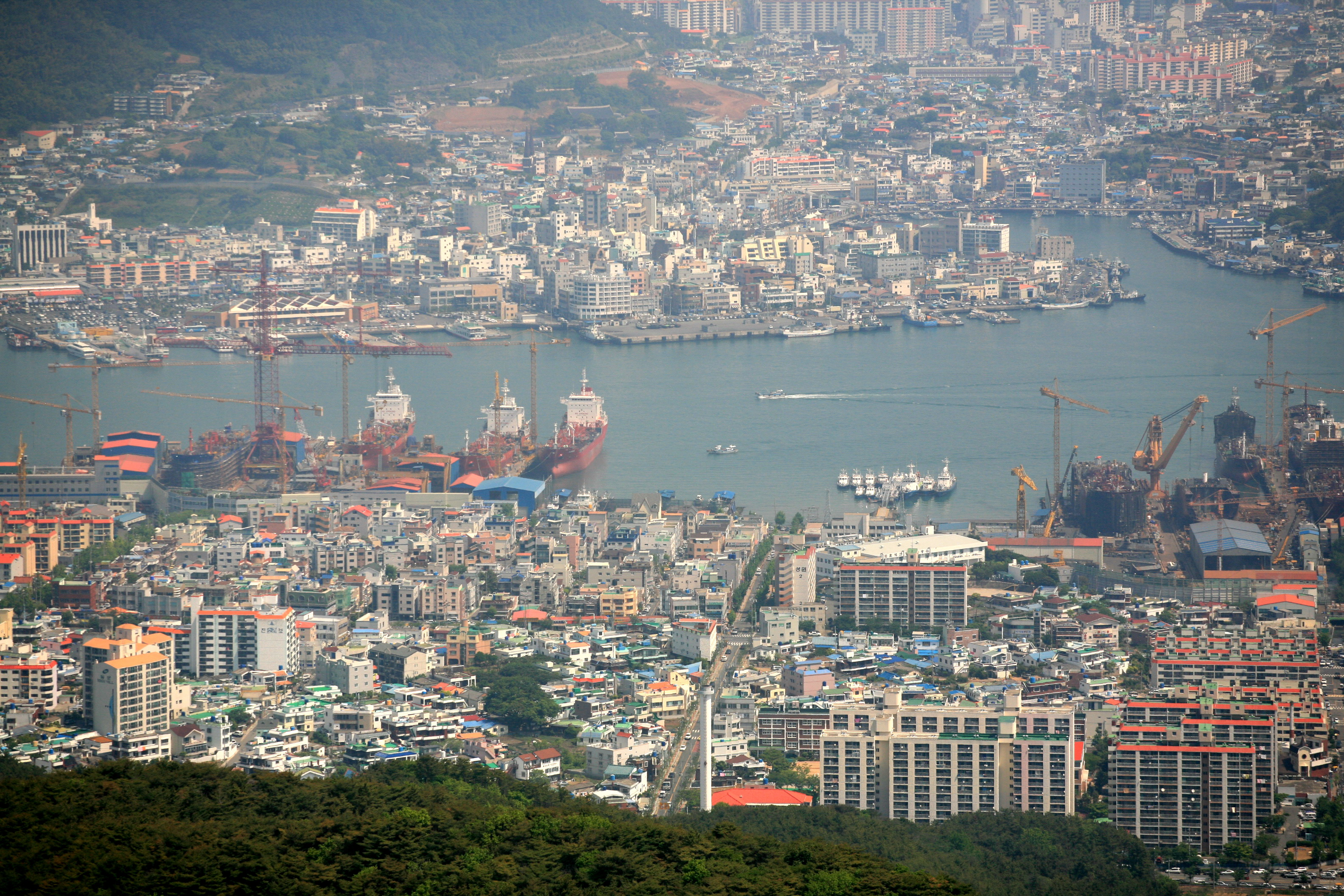
Tongyeong

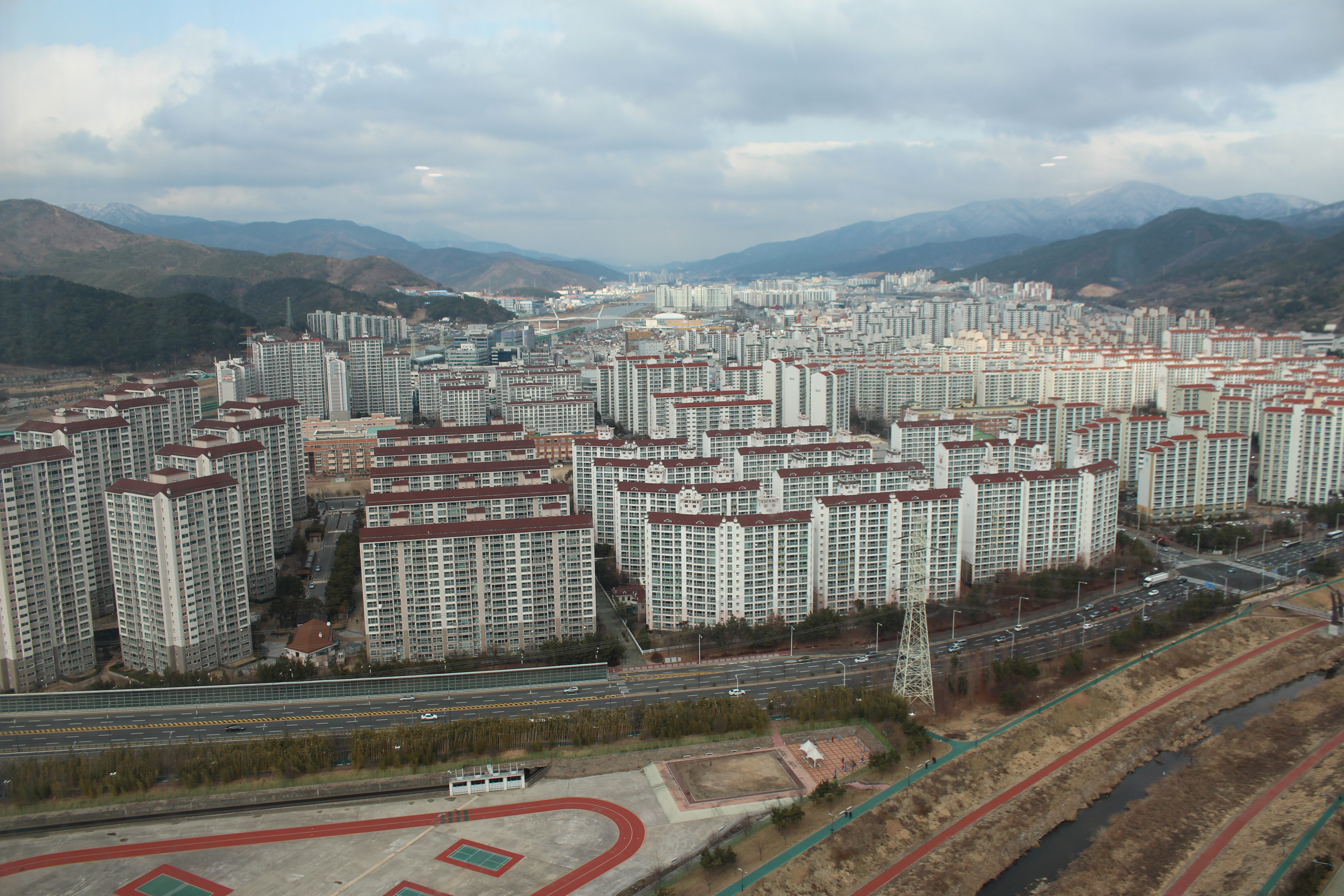
Yangsan

Gyeongsangnam-do is divided into 8 cities (si) and 10 counties (gun). The names below are given in English, hangul, and hanja.

Map	#	Name	Hangul	Hanja	Population (2024)	Subdivisions
— Specific City —
	1	Changwon	창원시	昌原市	1,001,902	5 ilban-gu — 2 eup, 6 myeon, 54 haengjeong-dong
	2	Gimhae	김해시	金海市	531,966	1 eup, 6 myeon, 12 haengjeong-dong
— City —
	3	Jinju	진주시	晉州市	339,338	1 eup, 15 myeon, 15 haengjeong-dong
	4	Yangsan	양산시	梁山市	358,074	1 eup, 4 myeon, 8 haengjeong-dong
	5	Geoje	거제시	巨濟市	232,921	9 myeon, 10 haengjeong-dong
	6	Tongyeong	통영시	統營市	118,896	1 eup, 6 myeon, 8 haengjeong-dong
	7	Sacheon	사천시	泗川市	108,650	1 eup, 7 myeon, 6 haengjeong-dong
	8	Miryang	밀양시	密陽市	100,802	2 eup, 9 myeon, 5 haengjeong-dong
— County —
	9	Haman County	함안군	咸安郡	59,102	2 eup, 8 myeon
	10	Geochang County	거창군	居昌郡	59,737	1 eup, 11 myeon
	11	Changnyeong County	창녕군	昌寧郡	56,246	2 eup, 12 myeon
	12	Goseong County	고성군	固城郡	48,356	1 eup, 13 myeon
	13	Namhae County	남해군	南海郡	40,060	1 eup, 9 myeon
	14	Hapcheon County	합천군	陜川郡	40,440	1 eup, 16 myeon
	15	Hadong County	하동군	河東郡	40,909	1 eup, 12 myeon
	16	Hamyang County	함양군	咸陽郡	36,307	1 eup, 10 myeon
	17	Sancheong County	산청군	山淸郡	33,373	1 eup, 10 myeon
	18	Uiryeong County	의령군	宜寧郡	25,168	1 eup, 12 myeon

== Government ==
=== Government Complex South Gyeongsang Province ===
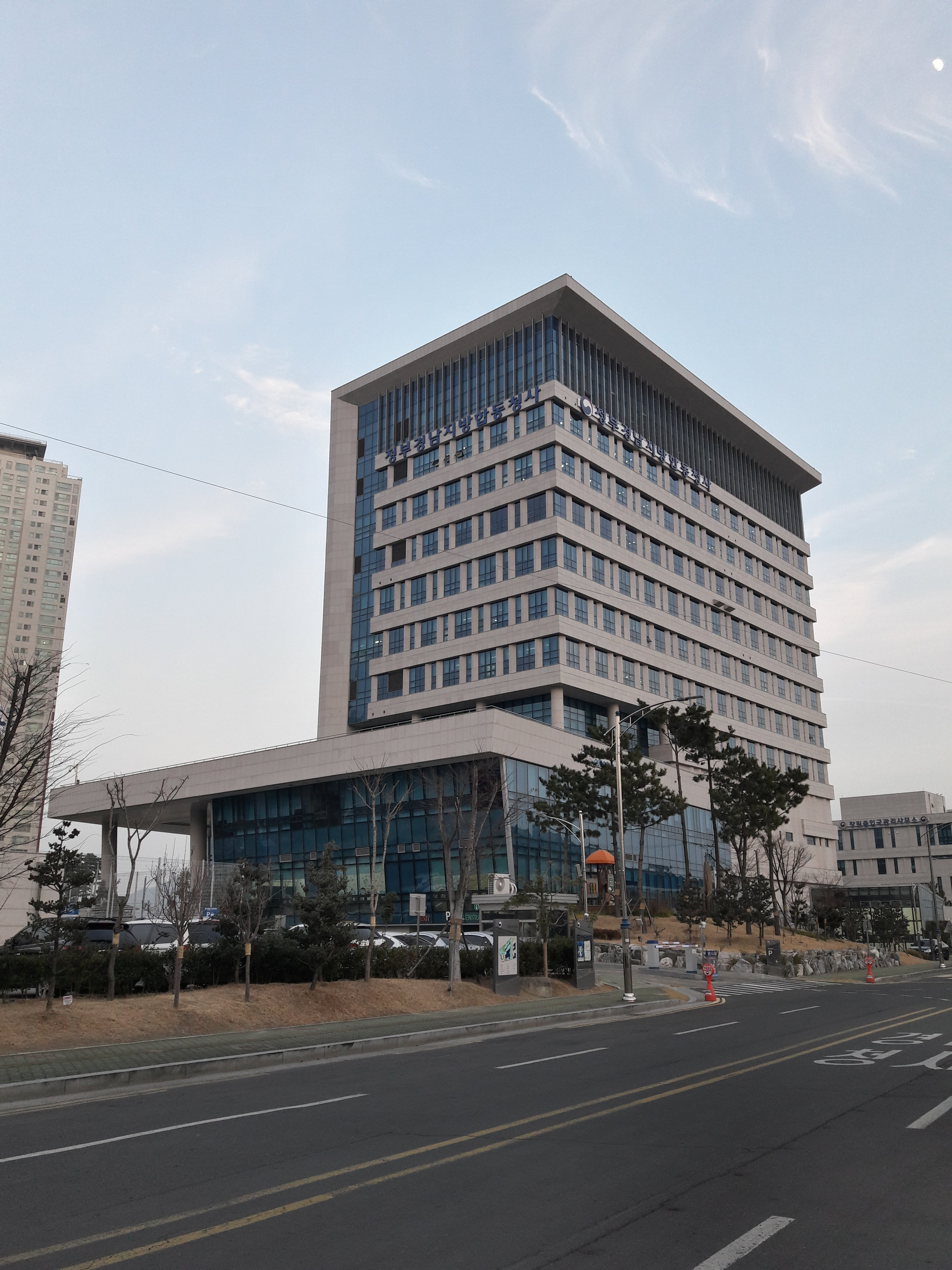
Gyeongnam Regional Government Complex in Changwon

Gyeongnam Regional Government Complex was built to integrate government agencies in Changwon and Masan. It was completed in March 2013.

== Sister districts ==
- Yamaguchi Prefecture (July 26, 1987)
- (Malaysia) Kedah (July 3, 1989)
- Maryland (November 18, 1991)
- Shandong (September 8, 1993)
- East Java (May 9, 1996)
- Đồng Nai Province (September 1, 1996)
- Khabarovsk Krai (September 14, 1996)
- Jalisco (March 10, 1997)
- Laguna province (April 15, 1997)
- Pomeranian Voivodeship (April 22, 1997)
- Fejér County (April 24, 1997)

== Notable people from South Gyeongsang Province ==
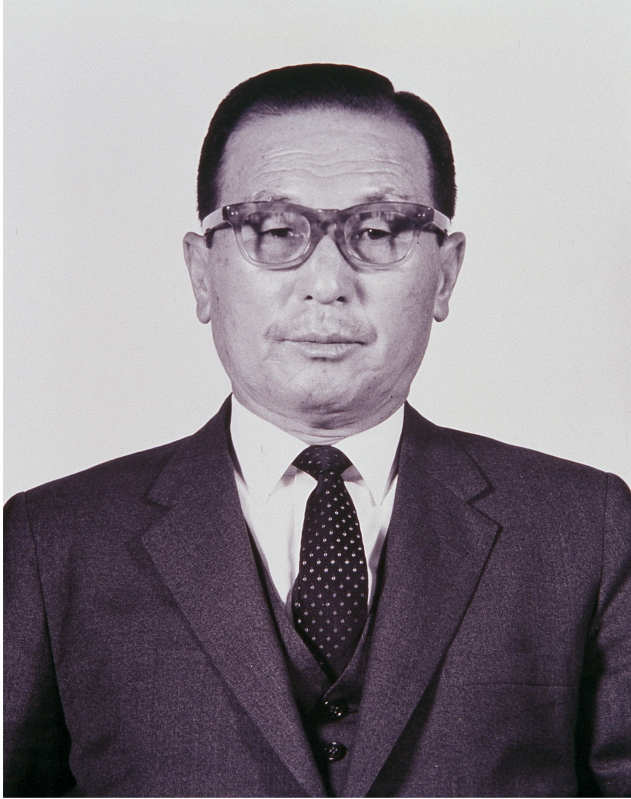
Koo In-hwoi

- Chun Doo-hwan, Former South Korean President
- Kim Young-sam, Former South Korean President
- Roh Moo-hyun, Former South Korean President
- Moon Jae-in, Former South Korean President
- Winter (Kim Min-jeong), a member of K-pop girl group, Aespa
- Koo In-hwoi, South Korean businessman and the founder of LG Group
- Jeong Eun-Ji, a member of K-pop girl group, Apink
- Choi San, a member of K-pop boy group, Ateez

== See also ==
- Igeum-dong site - complex archaeological site in Sacheon-si
- Gyeongsang National University
- Tongyeong International Music Festival
- North Gyeongsang Province

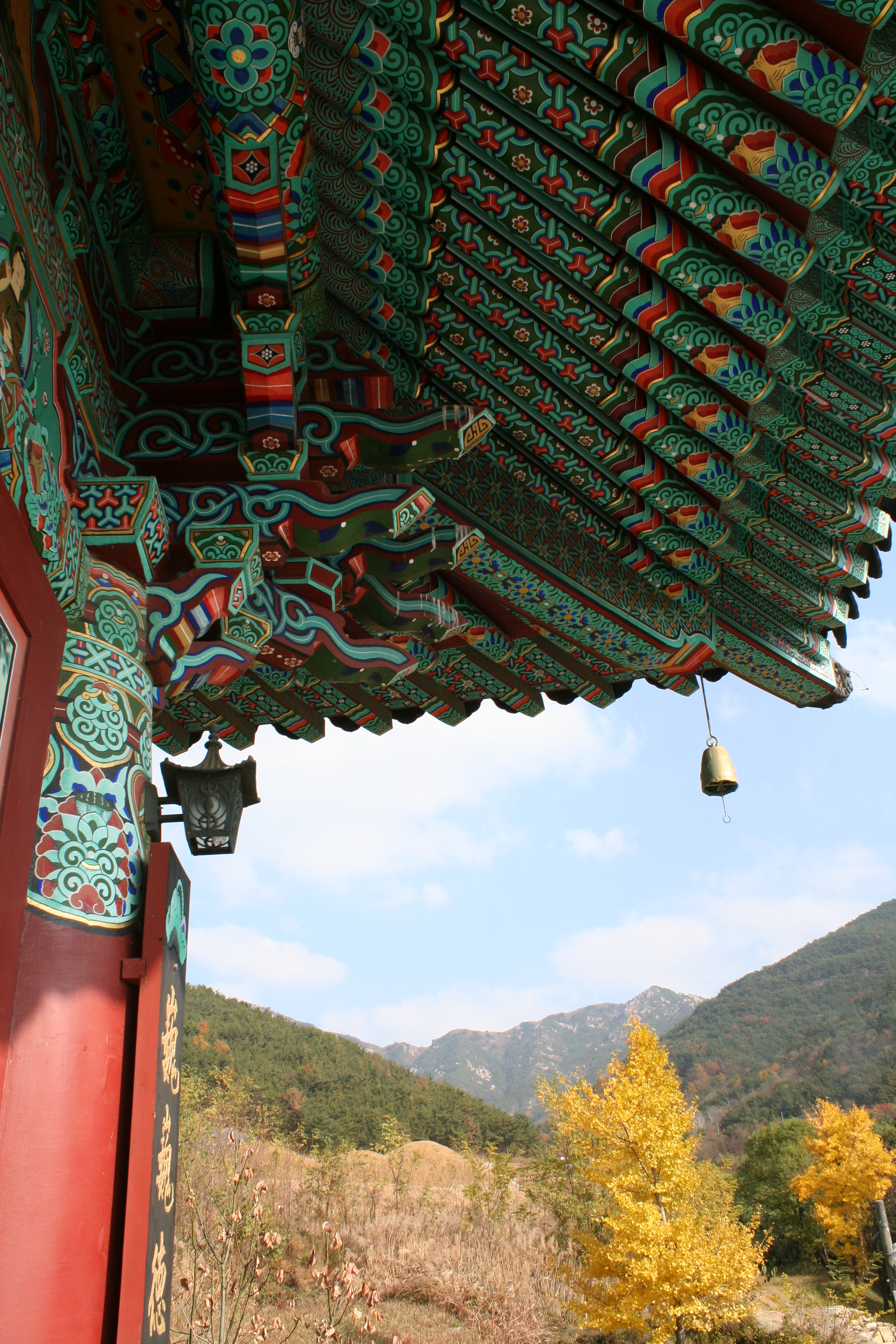
Changnyeong Temple at the base of Mount Hwawang
