= Gyeongsang dialect =

Major dialect in South Korea

Gyeongsang
- Southeastern Korean
- 경상도 방언(사투리) 慶尙道 方言
- Native to: South Korea
- Region: Yeongnam (Gyeongsang Province)
- Language family: Koreanic: Korean; Gyeongsang
- Dialects: North Gyeongsang; South Gyeongsang

Language codes
- ISO 639-3: –
- Glottolog: kyon1247

The Gyeongsang dialects (Korean: 경상도 사투리; RR: Gyeongsangdo saturi; alternatively romanized as Kyongsang or Kyungsang), also known as Southeastern Korean (동남 방언; Dongnam Bangeon; lit. 'Southeastern Dialect'), are dialects of the Korean language from the historical region of Gyeongsang Province. Today, the region is divided into Daegu, Busan, Ulsan, North Gyeongsang Province, and South Gyeongsang Province, which together comprise the Yeongnam region. The dialect group may also be referred to by this region name.

Gyeongsang dialects vary. A native speaker can distinguish the dialect of Daegu from that of the Busan-Ulsan area although the first city is less than 100 kilometers (62 miles) away from the latter two cities. Dialectal forms are relatively similar along the midstream of Nakdong River but are different near Busan and Ulsan, Jinju and Pohang as well as along the eastern slopes of Mount Jiri.

After Standard Korean, it is the next most prevalent Korean variety. There are approximately 13,000,000 speakers.

== Phonology ==
=== Vowels ===
Monophthongs in Gyeongsang
Hangul	RR	IPA
ㅏ	a (Note: Instead of /a/, some authors use /ɑ/.)	/a/
ㅔ	e	/e ~ ɛ/
ㅐ	ae (Note: Instead of /ɛ/, some authors use /æ/.)	/e ~ ɛ/
ㅣ	i	/i/
ㅡ	eu (Note: Instead of /ɨ/, some authors use /ɯ/.)	/ɨ ~ ʌ/
ㅓ	eo (Note: Instead of /ʌ/, some authors use /ə/.)	/ɨ ~ ʌ/
ㅗ	o	/o/
ㅜ	u	/u/

Most Gyeongsang dialects have historically been considered to have six phonemic vowels; however, a shift in this system has been occurring in younger speakers (as explained in the next paragraph). Vowels which may be distinct in other Korean dialects but historically considered merged in Gyeongsang are indicated with a tilde in the adjacent table.

In most South Korean dialects, the vowels ⟨ㅐ⟩ (ae) and ⟨ㅔ⟩ (e) have merged (See Korean phonology § Vowels). A 2015 study found that Gyeongsang dialect speakers merged these sounds more significantly than speakers from central regions of Korea, but less so than speakers from southwestern Korea in Jeonbuk or Jeonnam. The same study also identified a key difference between northern & southern Gyeongsang dialects: in the north (Gyeongbuk), the vowels ⟨ㅡ⟩ (eu) and ⟨ㅓ⟩ (eo) are distinct, whereas in the south (Gyeongnam) they are indistinguishable. However, several more recent studies (2016, 2022, 2024) noted that younger speakers of the southern dialects are moving toward a split of the vowels. At the same time, younger speakers are approaching a merger of ⟨ㅗ⟩ (o) and ⟨ㅜ⟩ (u), which was also found to be the case in the 2015 study.

W and y are generally dropped after a consonant, especially in South Gyeongsang dialects. For example, soegogi (쇠고기) 'beef' is pronounced sogogi (소고기), and gwaja (과자) 'confectionery' is pronounced ggaja (까자).

Vowels are fronted when the following syllable has a y or i, unless a coronal consonant intervenes. For example, eomi 'mother' is emi, and gogi 'meat' is gegi.

=== Consonants ===
Southern Gyeongsang (specifically, nearby Namhae) dialects lack the tense consonant ss (ㅆ). Thus, the speakers pronounce ssal (쌀), meaning "rice", the same way as sal (살), meaning "flesh". Palatalization is widespread: gy-, gi, ki and ky- are pronounced j and ch, e.g. 귤 is jul and 기름 is jileum, while hy- is pronounced s, e.g. 힘 is sim. Many words have tense consonants where the standard is tenuis. Middle Korean z and β are preserved as s and b, as in 새비 saebi for Standard Korean 새우 saeu "shrimp" or 가새 gasae for Standard Korean 가위 gawi "scissors".

=== Tone ===
The tonal system of Middle Korean became largely extinct around the 17th century, but it lives on in the Gyeongsang dialects.

Dialects are classified as North Gyeongsang or South Gyeongsang based on pitch accent. North Gyeongsang has high tone, low tone (short vowel), and high tone (long vowel), whereas South Gyeongsang has high, mid, and low tone. For example, South Gyeongsang distinguishes sóni 'guest', sōni 'hand', and sòni 'grandchild'. Pitch accent plays a grammatical role as well, for example distinguishing causative and passive as in jép-pida 'make s.o. catch' and jepída 'be caught'.

In North Gyeongsang, any syllable may have pitch accent in the form of a high tone, as may the two initial syllables. For example, in trisyllabic words, there are four possible tone patterns:

- 메누리[mé̞.nu.ɾi] ('daughter-in-law')
- 어무이[ə.mú.i] ('mother')
- 원어민[wə.nə.mín] ('native speaker')
- 오래비[ó̞.ɾé̞.bi] ('elder brother')

== Grammar ==
The Gyeongsang dialect maintains a trace of Middle Korean: the grammar of the dialect distinguishes between a yes–no question and a wh-question, while Standard Modern Korean does not. With an informal speech level, for example, yes–no questions end with "-a (아)" and wh-questions end with "-o (오)" in the Gyeongsang dialect, whereas in standard speech both types of questions end in either "-ni (니)" or "-eo (어)" without a difference between the types of questions. For example:

- "밥 뭇나?" [Bap múnna?] or "밥 묵읏나?" [Bap múgeunna?] as opposed to "밥 먹었니?" [Bap meogeonní?] or "밥 먹었어?" [Bap meogeosséo?] (casual greetings in Korean.)

 — "Did you have a meal?" or "Did you eat?" 

- "머 뭇노?" [Meo munno?] as opposed to "뭘 먹었니?" [Meol meogeonni?] or "뭘 먹었어?" [Meol meogeosseo?]

 — "What did you eat?"

Notice that the first question can be answered with a yes or no, while the latter question requires detail explanation of the food eaten.

However, -no also works as a rhetorical question ending.

- "이거 와 이래 맛있노" [Igeo wa irae masinno.]

 - Literal meaning "Why is this so delicious?", actual meaning "This is so delicious."

This phenomenon can also be observed in tag questions, which are answered with a yes or no.

- "Eopje, geújya?" (업제, 그쟈?) as opposed to "Eopji, geureotchí?" (없지, 그렇지?)

 — "It isn't there, is it?"

== Sociolinguistics ==
While most Korean speakers do not favour their home dialects, Gyeongsang speakers view their own dialect positively. In 1993, a study of 1365 people from across Korea revealed that Gyeongsang speakers felt less affection and pride towards their dialect compared to speakers of other dialects. In a 2010 study by the National Institute of Korean Language, 20% of speakers from the Gyeongsang region reported feeling 'awkward' when conversing with Standard Korean speakers. This suggests that some Gyeongsang speakers may feel linguistic inferiority.

From the Park Chung Hee to the Kim Young-sam governments (1961–1997), the Gyeongsang dialect had greater prominence in the Korean media than other dialects as all of the presidents except Choi Kyu-hah were natives of Gyeongsang province. That is why some South Korean politicians or high-rank officials have been misunderstood for not trying to convert to the Seoul accent, which is considered standard in South Korea.

== See also ==
- Dialectology
