= Dongdaesan =

Dongdaesan (동대산) is the name of several mountains in South Korea:

- Dongdaesan (Gangwon), in Pyeongchang and Gangneung, Gangwon Province, 1,434 metres
- Dongdaesan (North Gyeongsang), in Pohang and Yeongdeok, North Gyeongsang Province, 791 metres
- Dongdaesan (Ulsan), 447 metres
- Dongdae Mountains
