= Gamsansa =

Korean Buddhist temple

Coordinates: 35°45′59″N 129°20′13″E

- Hangul: 감산사지
- Hanja: 甘山寺址
- RR: Gamsansaji
- MR: Kamsansaji

Gamsansa refers to a Korean Buddhist temple established during the country's Unified Silla dynasty. Save for a partially reconstructed pagoda, none of the original temple structures survive. Gamsansa was located approximately 20 kilometers south of the city of Gyeongju, at the time the capital of Silla, not far from the more famous Silla temple of Bulguksa.

According to engravings preserved on extant artifacts excavated from the temple site as well as the 13th century Korean work Samguk Yusa, Gamsan (‘sweet mountain’) Temple was established in 719 by the Silla aristocrat Kim Jiseong (金志誠; 652–?) on the site of his own estate, apparently to pray for the souls of his deceased parents and siblings as well as the future prosperity of the Silla kingdom. Two granite statues, of the Maitreya Buddha and Amithaba Buddha, were discovered during the Japanese colonial period in the early 20th century and later designated Korean National Treasures no. 81 and 82 respectively. The carving of the Maitreya Buddha had been commissioned by Kim and dedicated to the spirit of his father while the Amithaba was dedicated to the spirit of his mother. They are both currently held at the National Museum of Korea in Seoul. At the Gyeongju National Museum can be found 12 dancing zodiac figures carved in stone that once decorated the base of the temple's stone pagoda.
