= Tourism in Gyeongju =

Tourism in Gyeongju is a major industry and defining feature of Gyeongju, South Korea. Gyeongju is a major cultural site and tourist destination for South Koreans and foreigners with about 8 to 9 million visitors annually. A great deal of this is due to the city's status as a center of Silla heritage, derived from its former role as the capital of that ancient kingdom.

== Silla remains ==
Many Silla sites are included in Gyeongju National Park. In addition, the Gyeongju National Museum hosts many artifacts from the Silla kingdom which have been excavated from sites within the city and surrounding areas, including several royal crowns and other national treasures.

Some of Gyeongju's most famous sites relate to the Silla government's patronage of Buddhism. The grotto of Seokguram and the temple of Bulguksa were the first Korean sites to be included on the UNESCO World Heritage List, in 1995. In addition, the ruins of the old Hwangnyongsa temple, said to have been Korean's largest, are preserved on the slopes of Toham Mountain. Various Silla-era stone carvings of Buddhas and bodhisattvas are found on mountainsides throughout the city, particularly on Namsan.

The Gyerim, or "Chicken Forest," adjoins the Royal Tomb Complex in central Gyeongju. So does the Anapji pond, the Poseokjeong garden site, and the Cheomseongdae observatory. Each site is deeply woven into the legends and history of the Silla period.

A number of fortresses from the Silla period have been preserved. These include the Wolseong and Myeonghwal fortresses in the downtown area, and the Bu Mountain Fortress in Geoncheon-eup.

=== Tombs ===
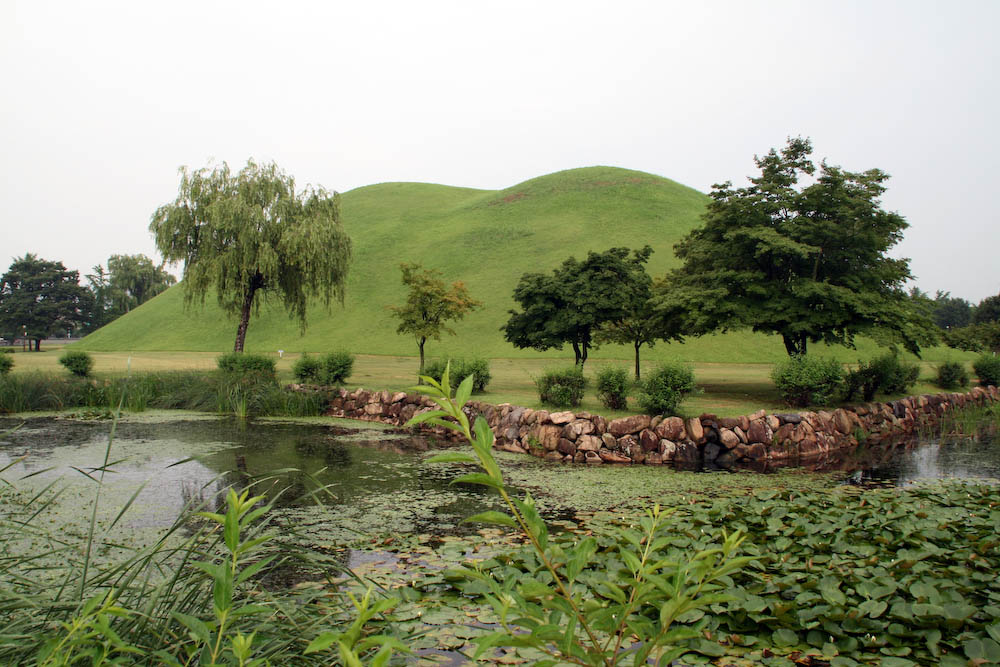
Tumuli Park, in the center of town, and its Burial Mounds

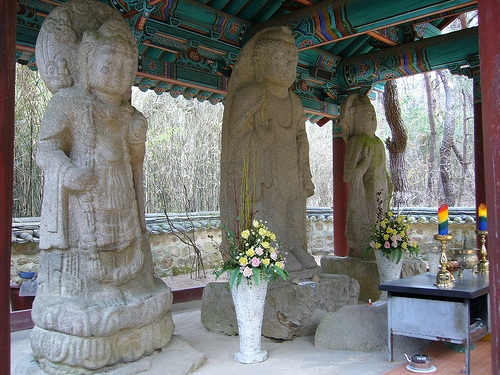
Buddhist statues on Namsan, near Gyeongju

The tombs of the rulers of Silla are all located within the boundaries of Gyeongju. The identity of the ruler is known in many cases, particularly for the later rulers. However, many of the older tombs found in the Royal Tombs Complex cannot be conclusively tied to any ruler. Partly for this reason, many of the tombs are known by the names of notable artifacts excavated there. One example of this is the Heavenly Horse Tomb, where a mudflap bearing a celestial horse motif was found.

Not all of the Silla-era tombs are royal. The tomb of the general Kim Yu-sin is located on one of the low mountains surrounding Gyeongju Basin.

A notable tomb outside the usual historical precincts of Gyeongju is that of King Munmu, d. 681, who was buried at sea just off the coast of Yangbuk-myeon. Munmu, the first king of Unified Silla, instructed that he should be buried there so that he could become a dragon and protect the Silla coastline.

== Later sites ==
Although Gyeongju no longer played a particularly central role during the Joseon Dynasty, a number of relics from that period have been preserved alongside the Silla sites. A few seowon, Confucian private schools which dotted the Korean countryside during the Joseon Dynasty, have been preserved. Seoak seowon is situated in the downtown area, and Oksan Seowon is preserved in Angang-eup. In Gangdong-myeon, a folk village keeps up the appearances of the late Joseon period. Adjacent to the Royal Tombs Complex in downtown Gyeongju, the houses of the Gyodong neighborhood also keep the hanok form they had in Joseon times. There are also important architecture built in the Joseon Dynasty. Gyeongju Seokbinggo is a seokbinggo or ice house located in the neighborhood of Inwang-dong, Gyeongju, North Gyeongsang province, South Korea. It was originally built in the Wolseong Fortress in 1738, the 14th year of King Yeongju. The Gyeongju Seokbinggo has been designated as the 66th Treasure of South Korea and managed by the Department of Culture and Tourism of the Gyeongju City.

Gyodong includes the main house of the Gyeongju Choi clan, which is also a famed brewery of beopju.

== Conferences and festivals ==
A significant portion of Gyeongju's tourist traffic is due to the city's successful promotion of itself as a site for various festivals, conferences, and competitions.

Every year since 1962 a Silla Cultural Festival (신라문화제) has been held in October to celebrate and honour the dynasty's history and culture. It is one of the major festivals of Korea. It features athletic events, folk games, music, dance, literary contests and Buddhist religious ceremonies. Other festivals include the Cherry Blossom Marathon in April, the Korean Traditional Drink and Rice Cake Festival in March, and memorial ceremonies for the founders of the Silla Dynasty and General Kim Yu-sin.

== Resorts and theme parks ==
The area surrounding the Bomun Lake reservoir, 6 km east of central Gyeongju, has been transformed into a resort area. A theme park named Gyeongju World is located on the reservoir's western shore, as is the Seonjae Art Gallery and the Bomun Outdoor Performance Hall. The Gyeongju World Culture Expo is held every 2–3 years in at Expo Park just south of the lake. Many of the city's principal hotels are also located in this area. Other resorts and hotels are found throughout the city.

== See also ==
- Tourism
- Tourism in South Korea
