= Tohamsan =

Mountain in southeastern South Korea

Coordinates: 35°45′24″N 129°22′25″E

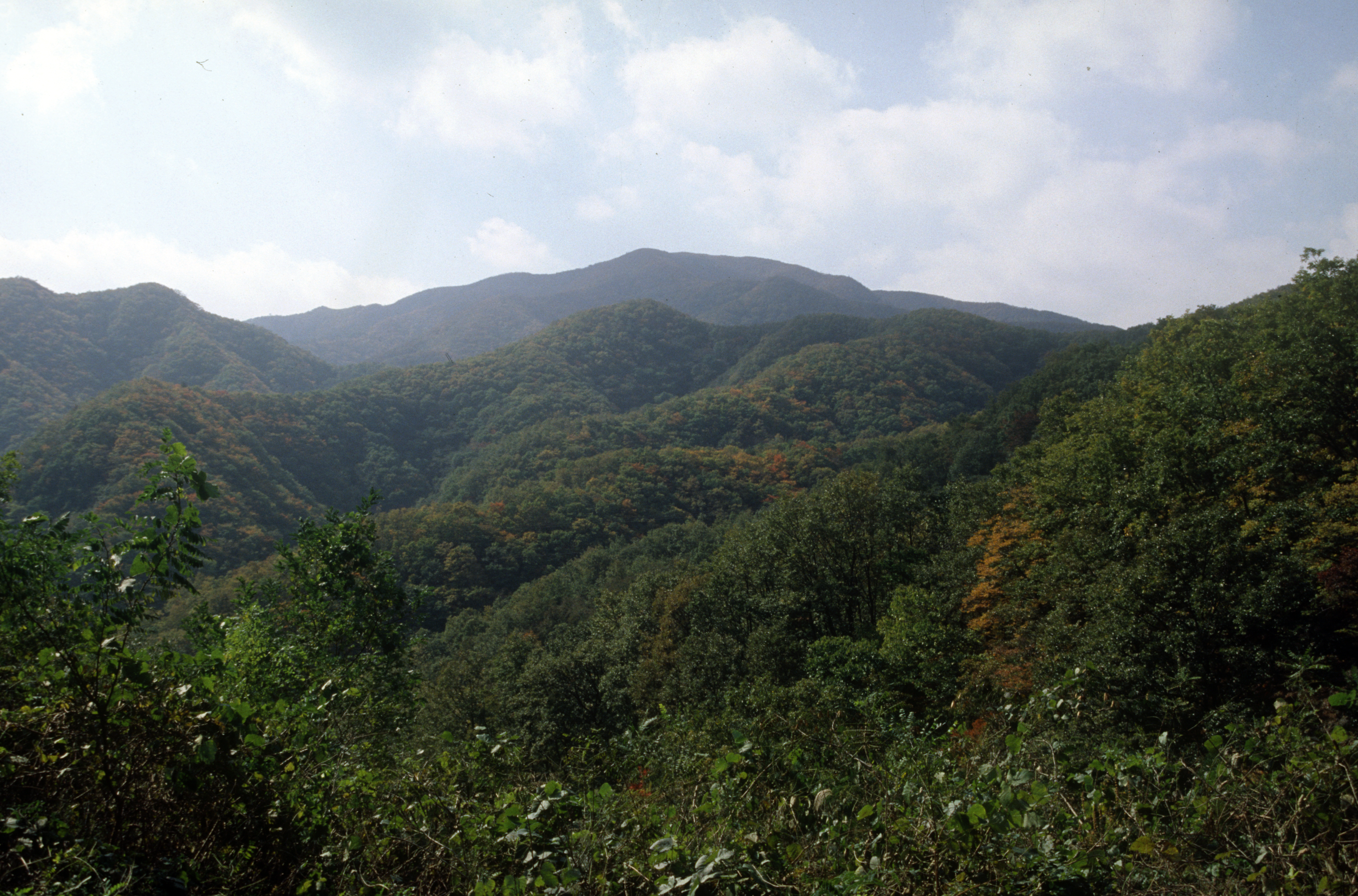
- The mountain in 2007

Geography

Korean name
- Hangul: 토함산
- Hanja: 吐含山
- RR: Tohamsan
- MR: T'ohamsan

Tohamsan (Korean: 토함산; lit. 'Toham Mountain') is a mountain with a height of 745 m (2,444 ft) in Gyeongju in southeastern South Korea. It is part of the minor Dongdae Mountains range. The mountain lies within Gyeongju National Park and is the site of a large number of historic relics. The Silla-era Buddhist shrines of Bulguksa and Seokguram are on its slopes. The mountain stands at the intersection of three subdivisions of Gyeongju: Bulguk-dong, Bodeok-dong, and Yangbuk-myeon. The Sea of Japan can be seen from the peak, as can Gyeongju Basin, which includes the city center.

During the Silla period, Toham mountain was referred to as Dongak (東嶽), literally meaning "East Big Mountain", and considered a guardian mountain of the country, so that major rituals were held.

== Gallery ==
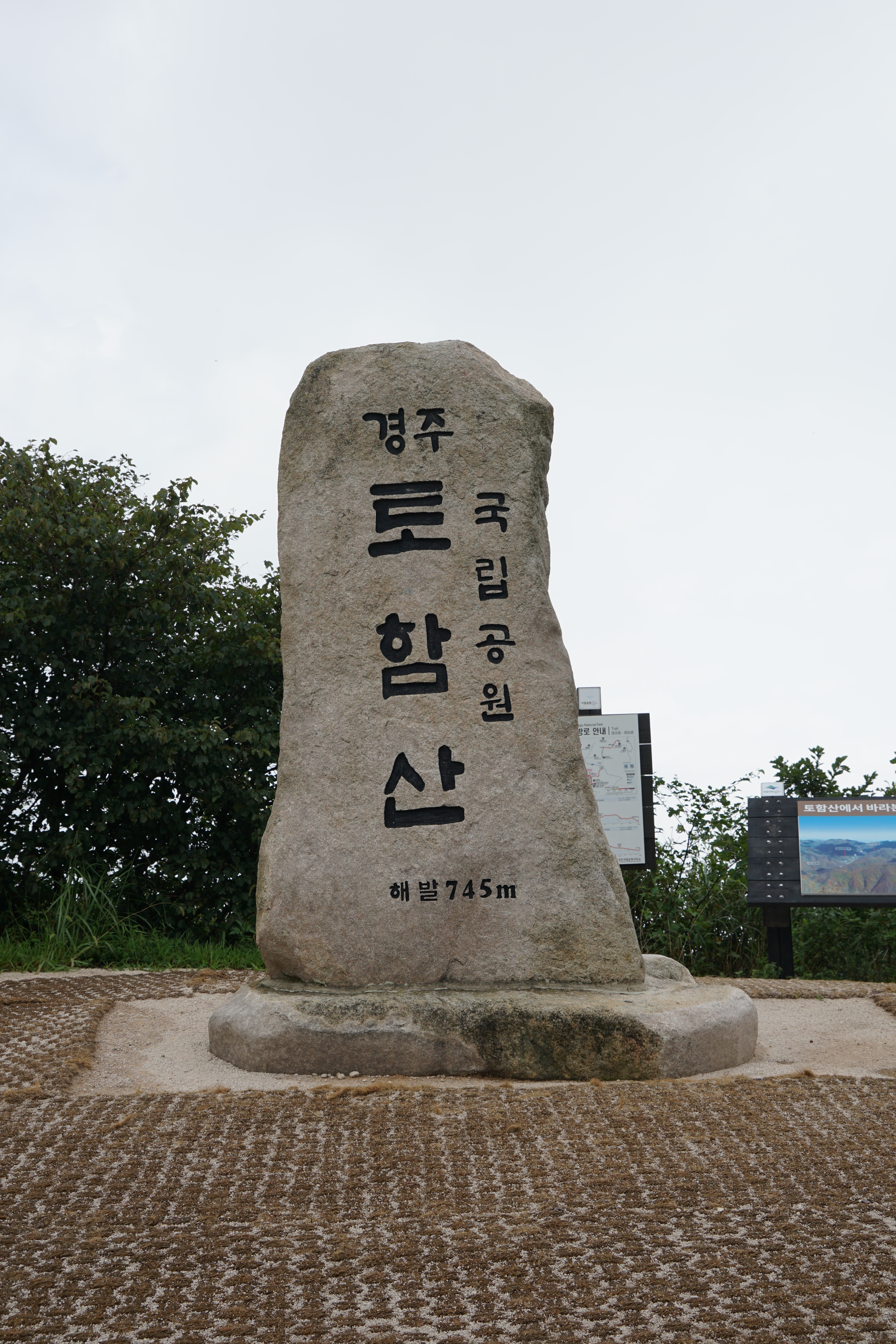
Marker at peak of the mountain (2018)

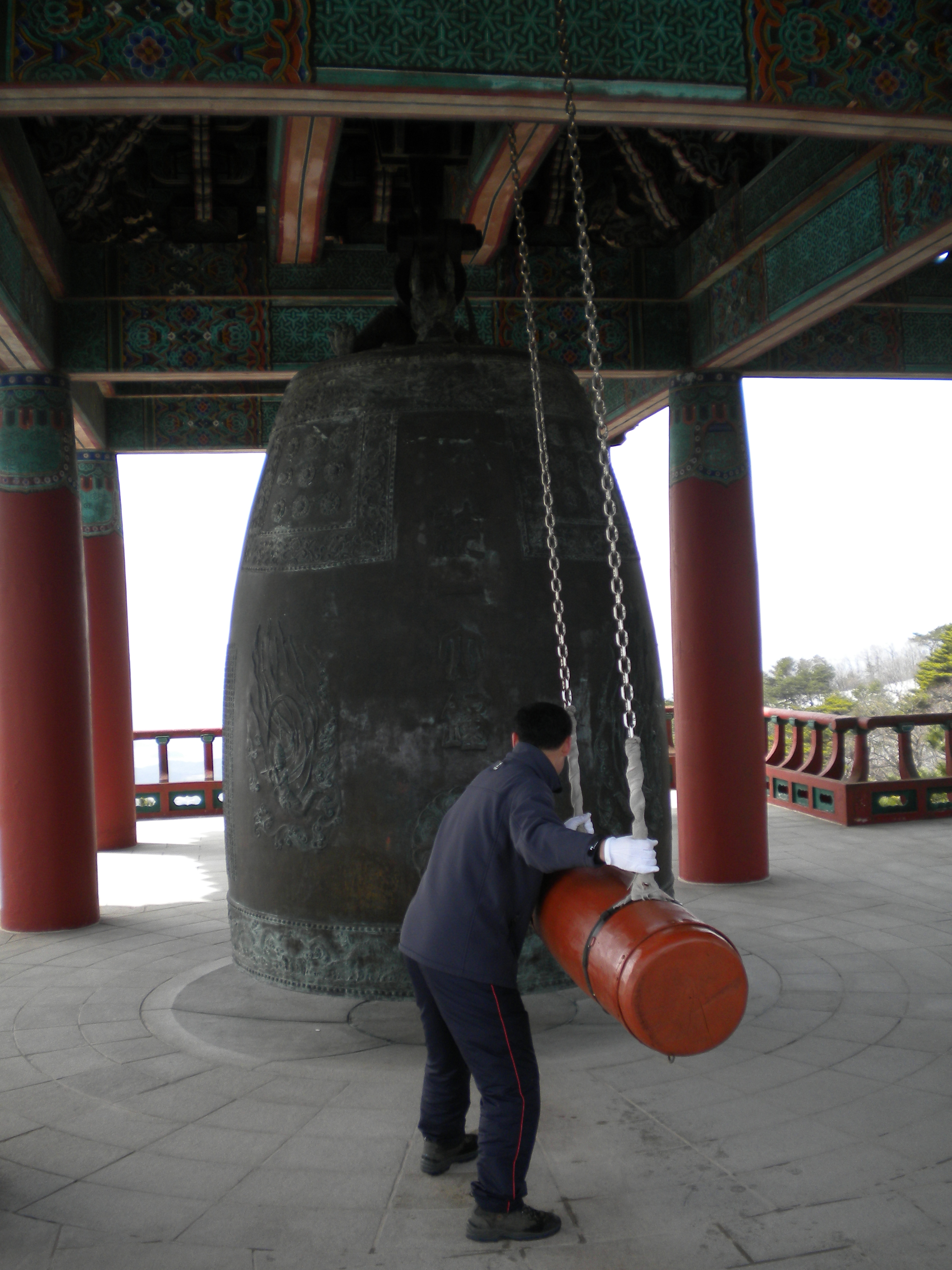
Ringing a bell on the mountain (2010)

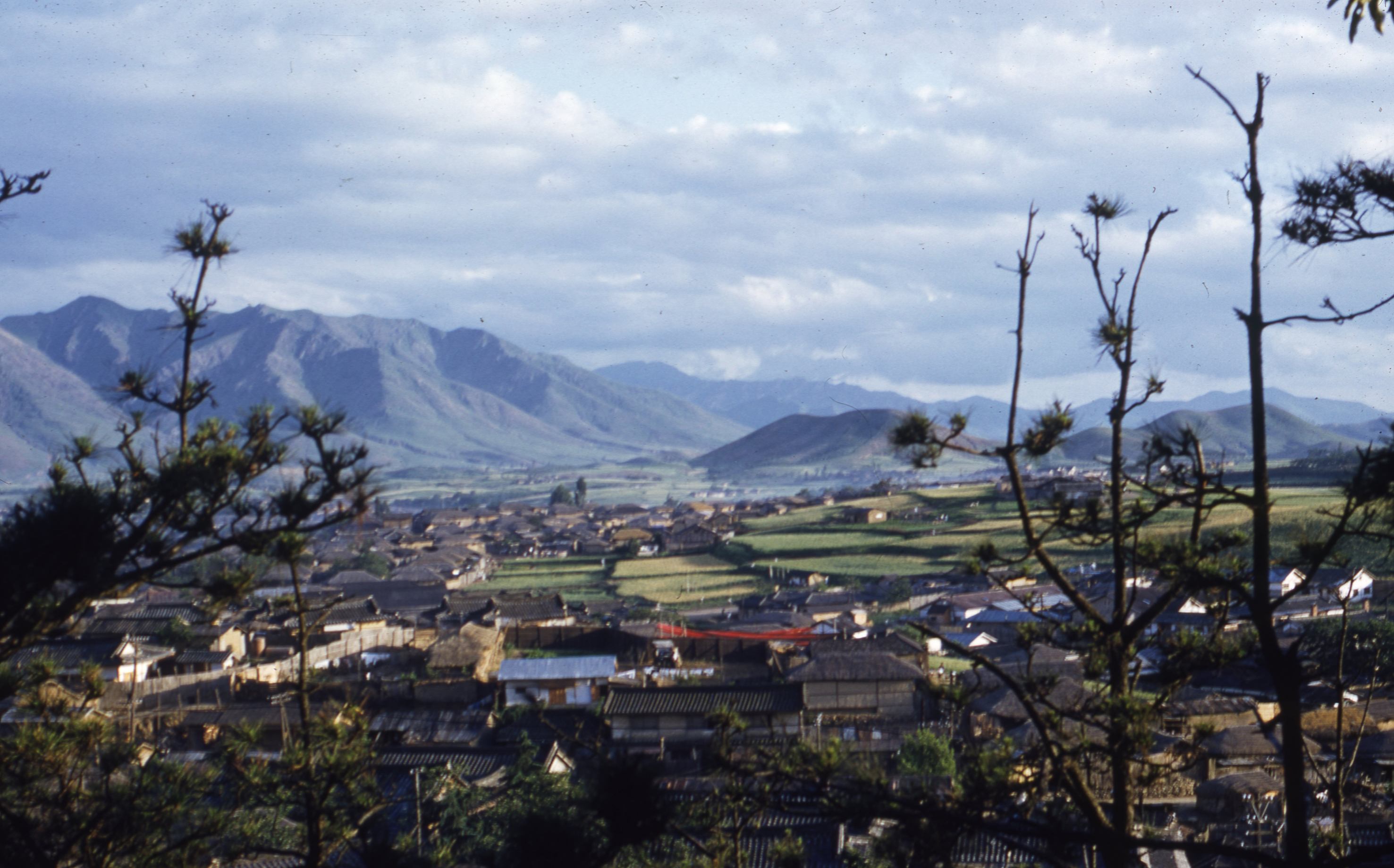
A village next to the mountain (1952)

== See also ==
- Geography of South Korea
- Korean Peninsula
- List of mountains in Korea
