= Dongdae Mountains =

Mountain range in South Korea

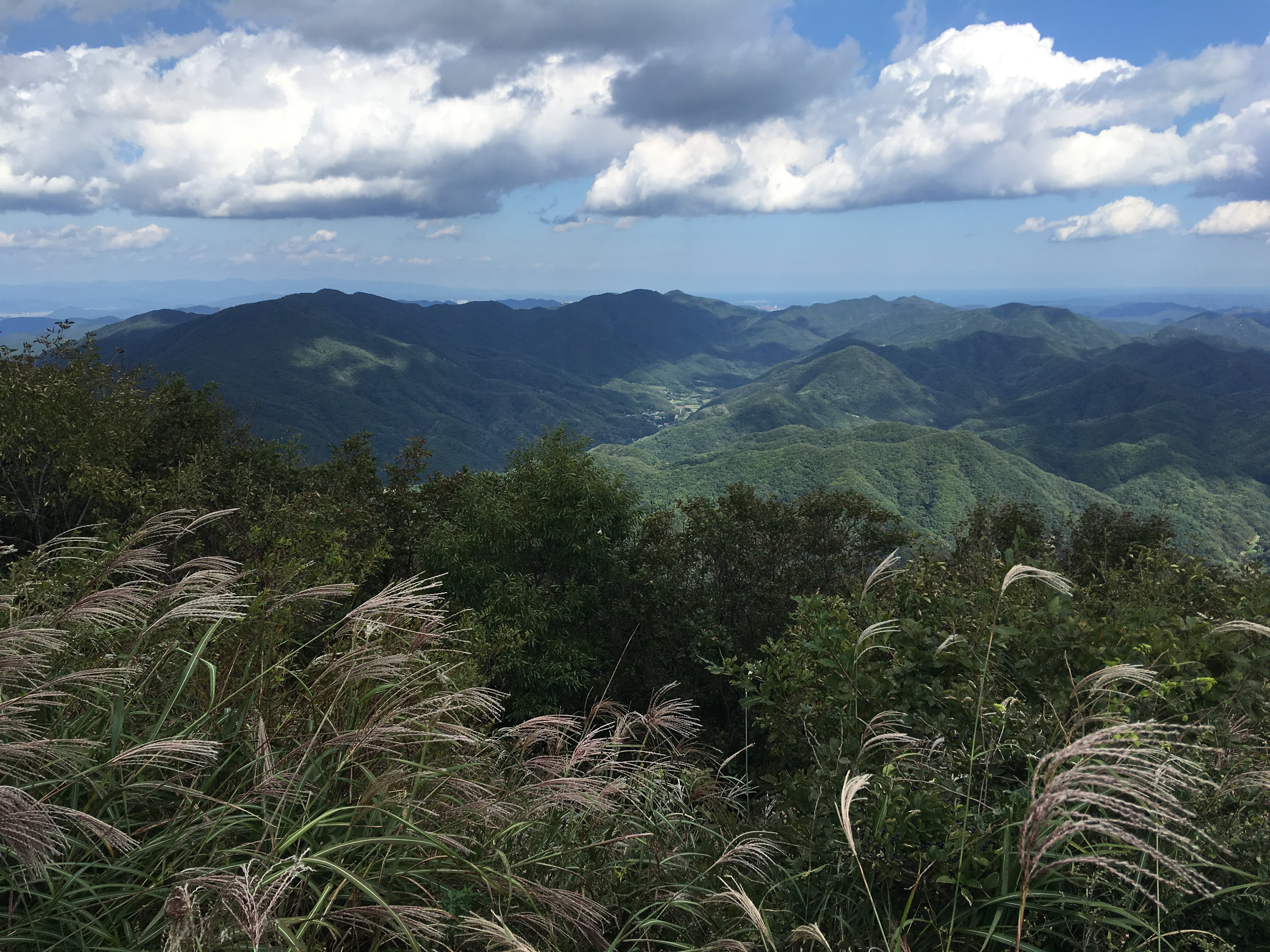

Korean name
- Hangul: 동대산맥
- Hanja: 東大山脈
- RR: Dongdaesanmaek
- MR: Tongdaesanmaek

The Dongdae Mountains (Korean: 동대산맥) are a small outlying range of the Taebaek Mountains. They run along the east coast of South Korea through the cities of Pohang, Gyeongju, and Ulsan. Notable peaks include Toham Mountain in Gyeongju National Park, as well as Dongdae Mountain itself in Ulsan. The Dongdae Mountains separate the Hyeongsan River basin from the belt of small streams flowing directly into the Sea of Japan (East Sea).

== See also ==
- Geography of South Korea
- Yeongnam
