= Seokguram =

Buddhist temple in Gyeongju, South Korea

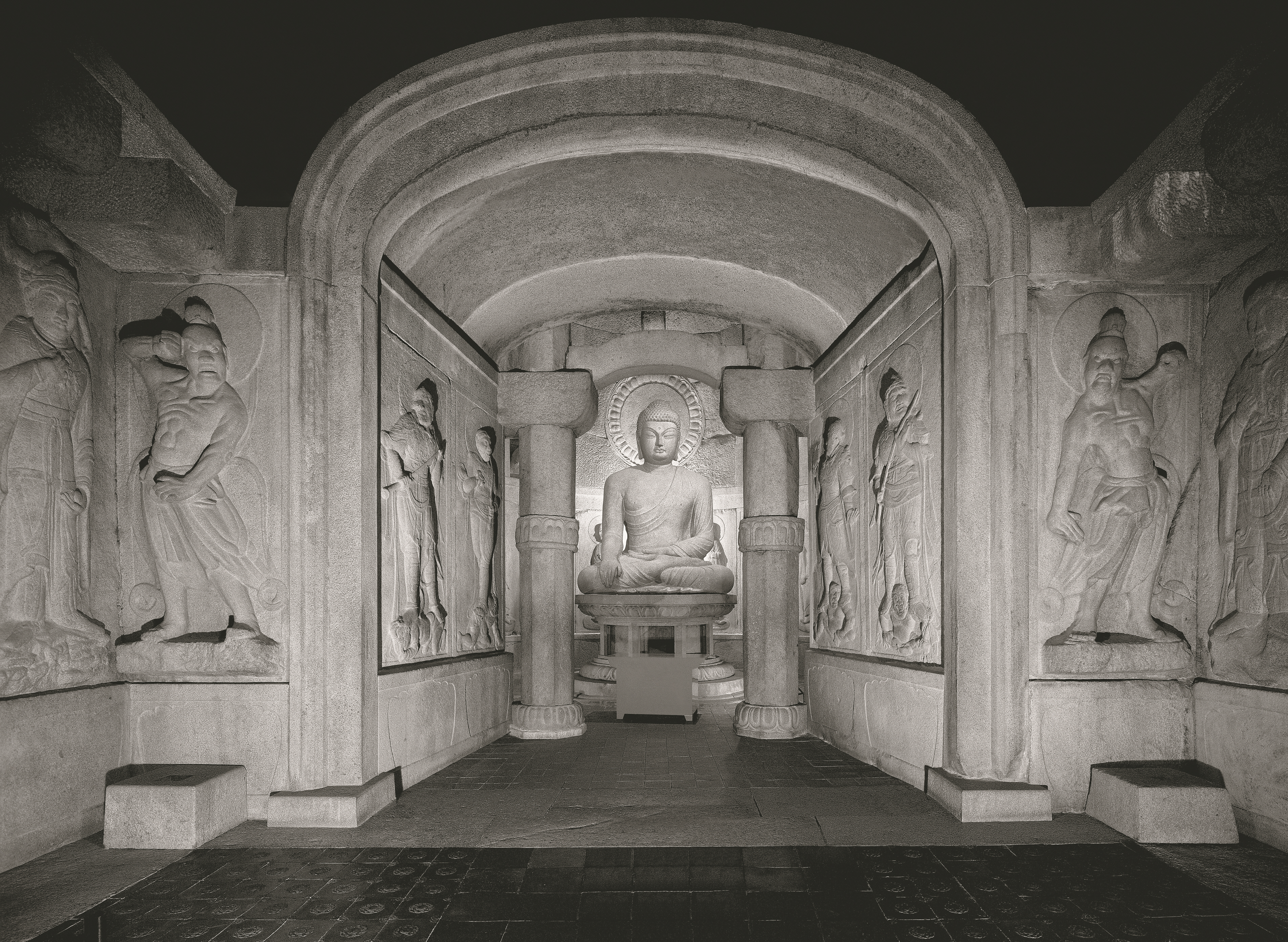
- Interior of Seokguram (2021)

Religion
- Affiliation: Korean Buddhism

Location
- Location: Gyeongju, South Korea
- Interactive map of Seokguram
- Coordinates: 35°47′42″N 129°20′57″E

Architecture
- UNESCO World Heritage Site
- Criteria: Cultural: i, iv
- Designated: 1995
- Parent listing: Seokguram Grotto and Bulguksa Temple
- Reference no.: 736
- National Treasure (South Korea)
- Designated: 1962-12-20
- Reference no.: Abolished

Korean name
- Hangul: 석굴암
- Hanja: 石窟庵
- RR: Seokguram
- MR: Sŏkkuram

Seokguram (Korean: 석굴암; Hanja: 石窟庵) is a hermitage and part of the Bulguksa temple complex in Gyeongju, South Korea. It and Bulguksa are both on the mountain Tohamsan, although the two are separated by distance of around 3 kilometres (1.9 mi). The grotto overlooks the East Sea and rests 750 meters above sea level. In 1962, it was designated as a National Treasure of South Korea. In 1995, Seokguram was added to the UNESCO World Heritage List together with the Bulguksa Temple. It exemplifies some of the best Buddhist sculptures in the world.

The Seokguram Grotto is said to have been built by Kim Daeseong and originally called Seokbulsa (석불사; lit. 'Stone Buddha Temple'). Construction began in 751, during the cultural peak of the kingdom Unified Silla. The grotto was completed by the Silla court in 774, shortly after Kim's death.

The grotto is currently one of the best known cultural destinations in South Korea. A viewing of the sunrise over the sea, which is visible from near the seated Buddha's perch, is especially popular.

The grotto is an artificial structure made of an antechamber,acorridor,and a main rotunda.Its domed ceiling and entrance corridor were built using more than 360 stone slabs.

== Architecture ==
The tradition of carving the image of Buddha in stone, holy images, and stupas into cliff walls and natural caves began in India, for the drawing of their own gods into rock to make statues. This practice was transferred to China and then Korea. The geology of the Korean Peninsula, which contains an abundance of hard granite, is not conducive to carving stone images into cliff walls.

The basic layout of the grotto includes an arched entrance which leads into a rectangular antechamber and then a narrow corridor, which is lined with bas-reliefs, and then finally leads into the main rotunda. The centerpiece of the granite sanctuary is a Buddha statue seated in the main chamber. The identity of the Buddha is still debated. The Buddha is seated on a lotus throne with legs crossed. The Buddha is surrounded by fifteen panels of bodhisattvas, arhats and ancient Indian gods in the rotunda and is accompanied by ten statues in niches along the rotunda wall. Forty different figures representing Buddhist principles and teachings are in the grotto, although only 38 remain today. The grotto was built around these statues to protect them from weathering. The ceiling of the Seokguram Grotto is decorated with half moons; the top is decorated with a lotus flower. Silla architects used symmetry and apparently employed the concept of the golden rectangle.

The grotto is shaped by hundreds of different granite stones. No mortar was used in its construction; the structure is held together by stone rivets. The construction of the grotto also utilized natural ventilation. The rotunda has a circular floor plan beneath a hemispherical ceiling; because the circle is slightly irregular, its diameter measures up to 6.8 meters at the widest and as little as 6.58 meters depending on the point of measurement.

The Seokguram Grotto is symbolic of a spiritual journey into Nirvana. Pilgrims were to start at Bulguksa or at the foot of Tohamsan, a holy mountain to the Silla.

=== Sculpture within the grotto ===
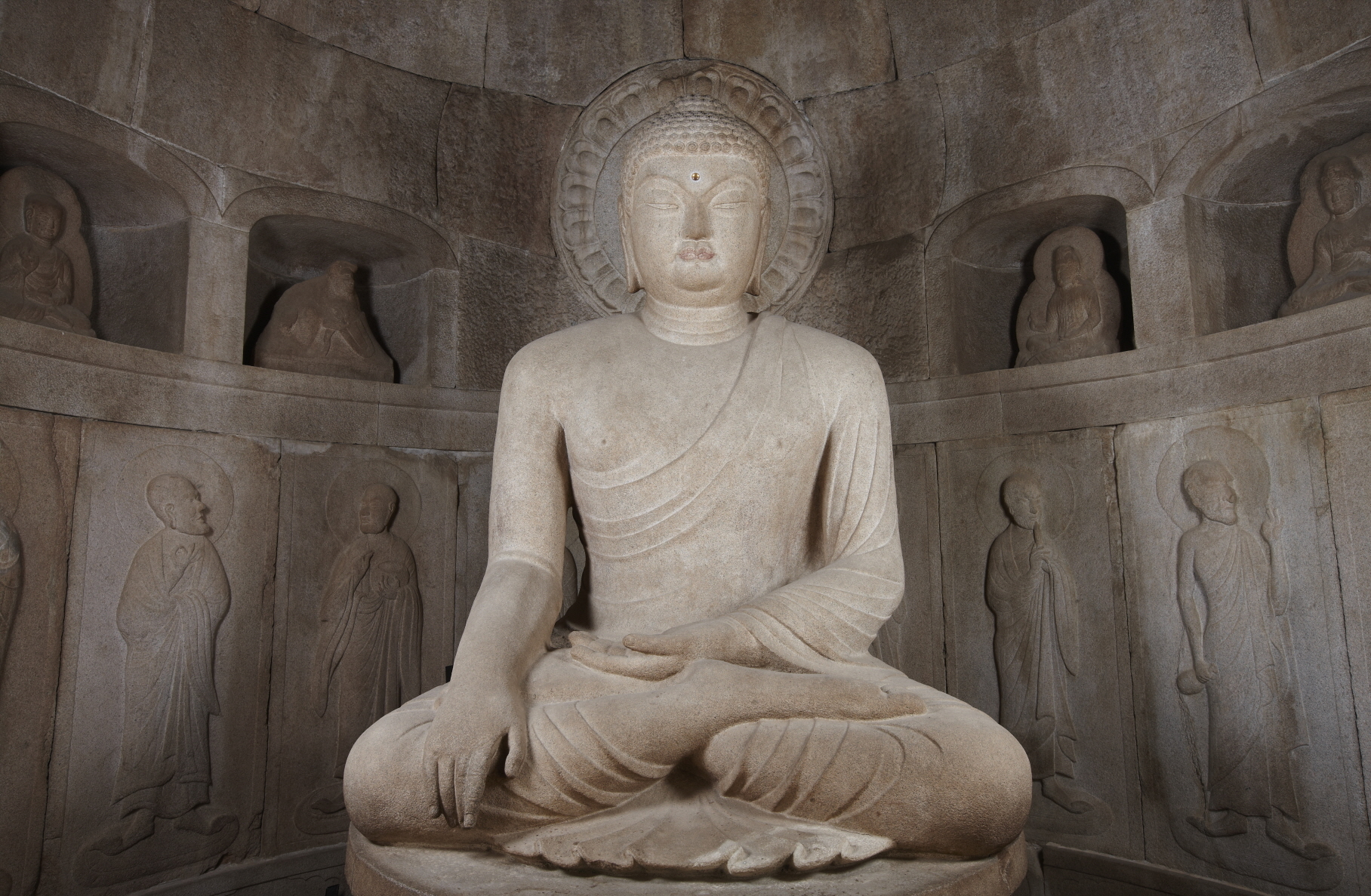
Front view of Buddha at Seokguram

The main Buddha of the grotto is a highly regarded piece of Buddhist art. It is 3.5 meters in height and sits on a 1.34-meter tall lotus pedestal. The Buddha is realistic in form and probably represents the Seokgamoni (Shakyamuni) Buddha; the position of the Buddha's hands symbolizes enlightenment. The Buddha has an usnisa, a symbol of the wisdom. The drapery on the Buddha, such as the fan-shaped folds at the crossed-legs of the Buddha, exemplifies Korean interpretations of Indian prototypes. Unlike other Buddhas that have a halo attached to the back of the head, the Buddha at Seokguram creates the illusion of a halo by placing a granite roundel carved with lotus petals on the back wall of the rotunda. The pedestal is made of three parts; the top and bottom are carved with lotus petals while the central shaft consists of eight pillars.

Accompanying the main Buddha, in relief, are three bodhisattvas, ten disciples, and two Hindu gods along the wall of the rotunda. Ten statues of bodhisattvas, saints, and the faithful are located in niches above the bas-reliefs. The ten disciples were disciples of Seokgamoni and are lined five on each side of the Avalokitesvara. Their features suggest a Greek influence. The two bodhisattvas are of Manjusri and Samantabhadra. The two Hindu gods are Brahma and Indra.

The Four Heavenly Kings guard the corridor. There are also images of Vajrapanis, which are guardian figures and they are on the walls of the entrance to the corridor, in the antechamber. Eight Guardian Deities adorn the antechamber.

Another notable figure is the Eleven-faced Avalokitesvara, the Bodhisattva of Compassion. It is on the back wall of the rotunda and stands 2.18 meters in height. This figure is the only one of the bas-reliefs facing forward; the others face the side. The Avalokitesvara wears a crown, is dressed in robes and jewelry and holds a vase containing a lotus blossom.

== Reconstruction ==
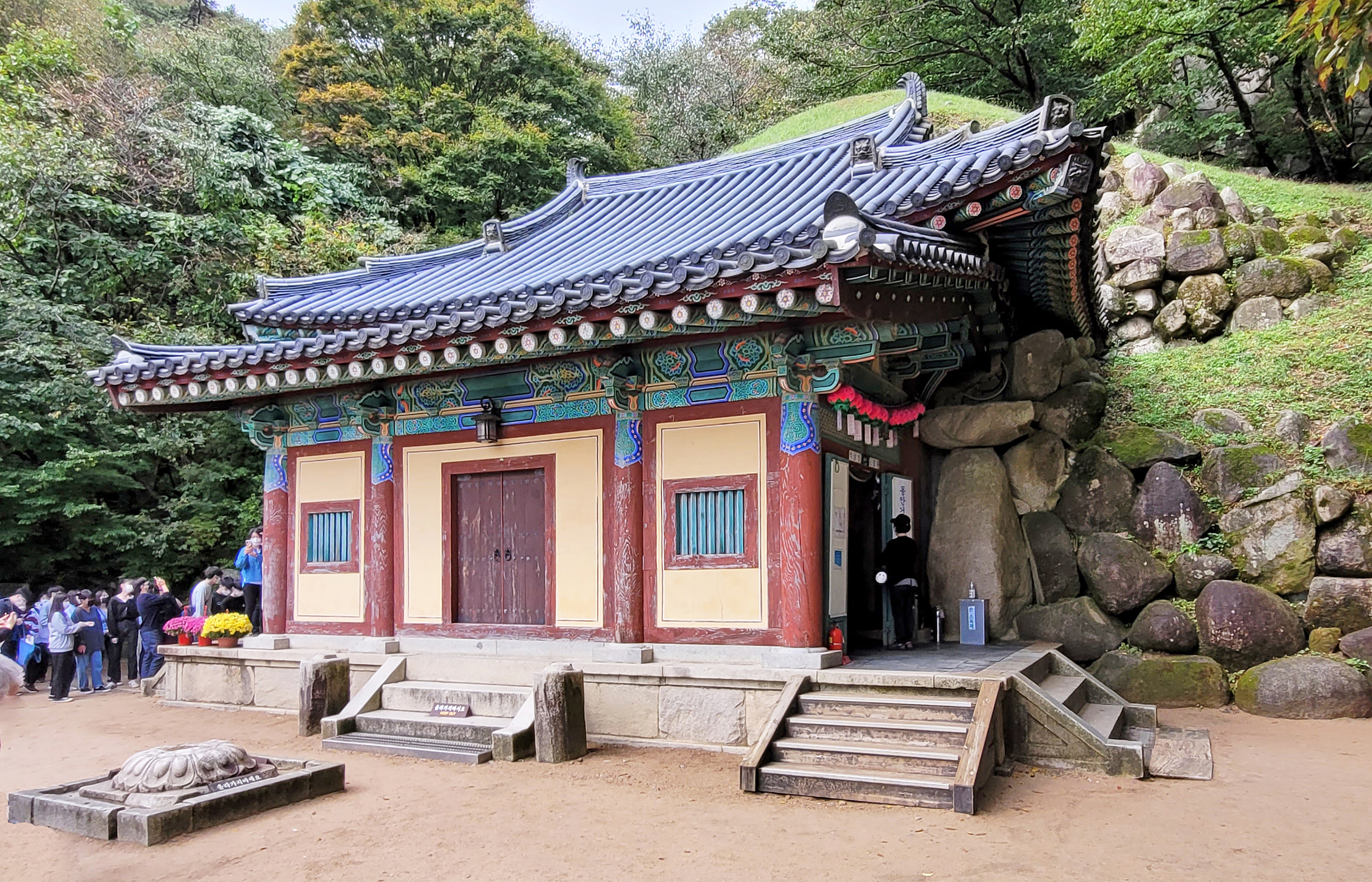
Entrance to grotto

Because of the long periods of abandonment and numerous renovations, many details are disputed amongst scholars, such as the exact layout of the original grotto, the buildings in Bulguksa or the shape of the watercourse, which no longer exists, in front of the temple.

Repair and improvements were undertaken in 1703 and 1758, during the Joseon period. However, Confucian-oriented rulers suppressed Buddhism, and the remote mountain grotto was seriously damaged by the turn of the 20th century. The Government-General of Chosen conducted restoration works three times, but faced humidity and other problems.

Japan did the first round of repairs from 1913 to 1915. These repairs were conducted without sufficient study of the structure of the grotto. During Japanese cleaning efforts, the structure of the grotto was almost completely dismantled and reassembled. A major mistake committed by the Japanese was their attempt to stabilize the structure by encasement in concrete, which was yet, the most advanced technology at the time. This resulted in humidity buildup and in water leaks, and caused erosion of the sculptures because the grotto could no longer "breathe". In 1917, drainage pipes were buried above the dome to channel rainwater away from the grotto. However, as leaks continued in spite of the pipes, another round of repairs was conducted from 1920 to 1923. Waterproof asphalt was applied to the surface of the concrete, which only worsened the problem. Moss and mold formed, and in 1927 the now unthinkable method of spraying hot steam was used to clean the sculptures.

After World War II, in the 1960s, President Park Chung Hee ordered a major restoration project. The problem of temperature and humidity control was resolved to an extent by using mechanical systems. The wooden superstructure built over the antechamber remains a subject for debate for many historians who believe Seokguram originally did not have such a structure blocking the view of the sunrise over the ocean, and cutting off the air flow into the grotto.

The interior of the grotto can now only be viewed through a glass wall, installed to protect it from the many tourists it attracts, as well as temperature change.

== Gallery ==
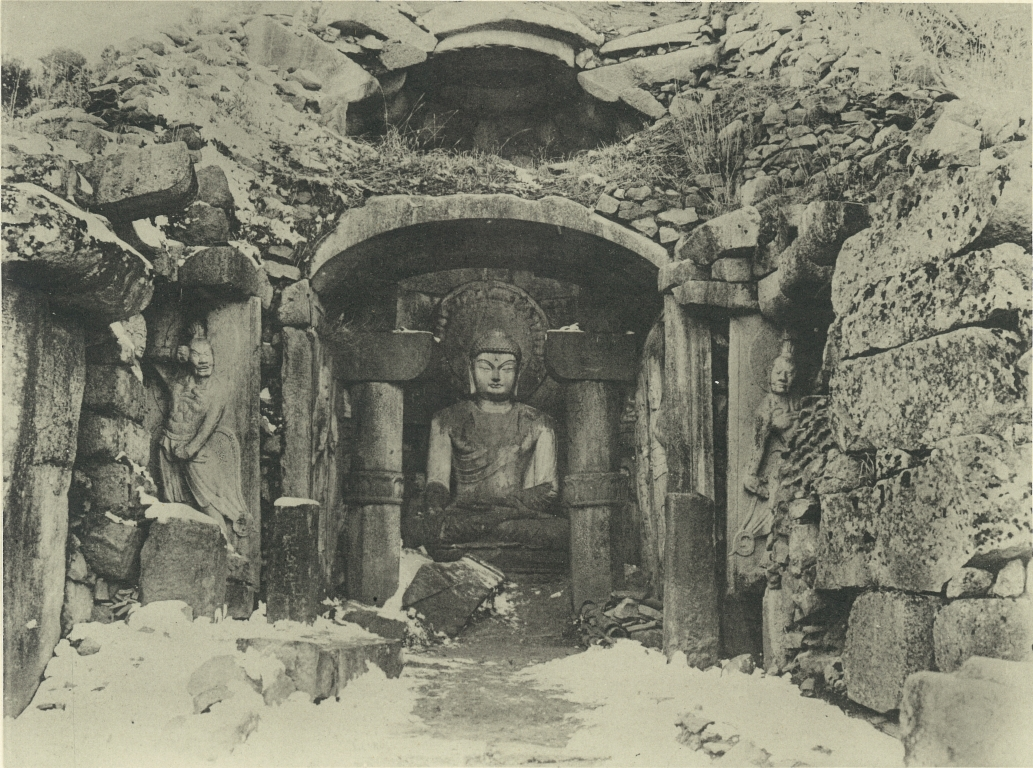
A photo of the grotto taken sometime before the restoration project by the Government-General of Chosen in 1923.

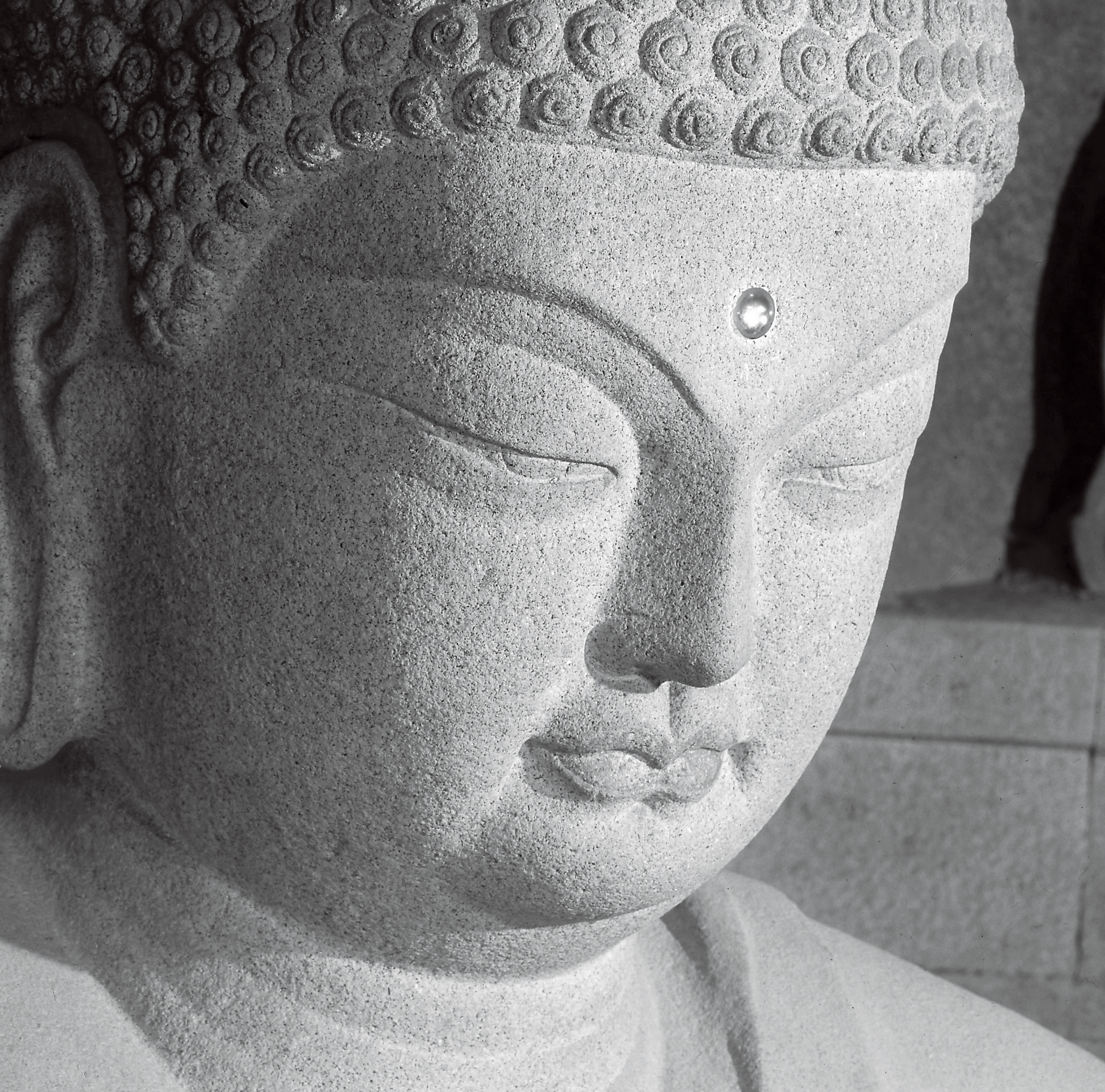
Detail of the face of the Buddha at Seokguram Grotto.

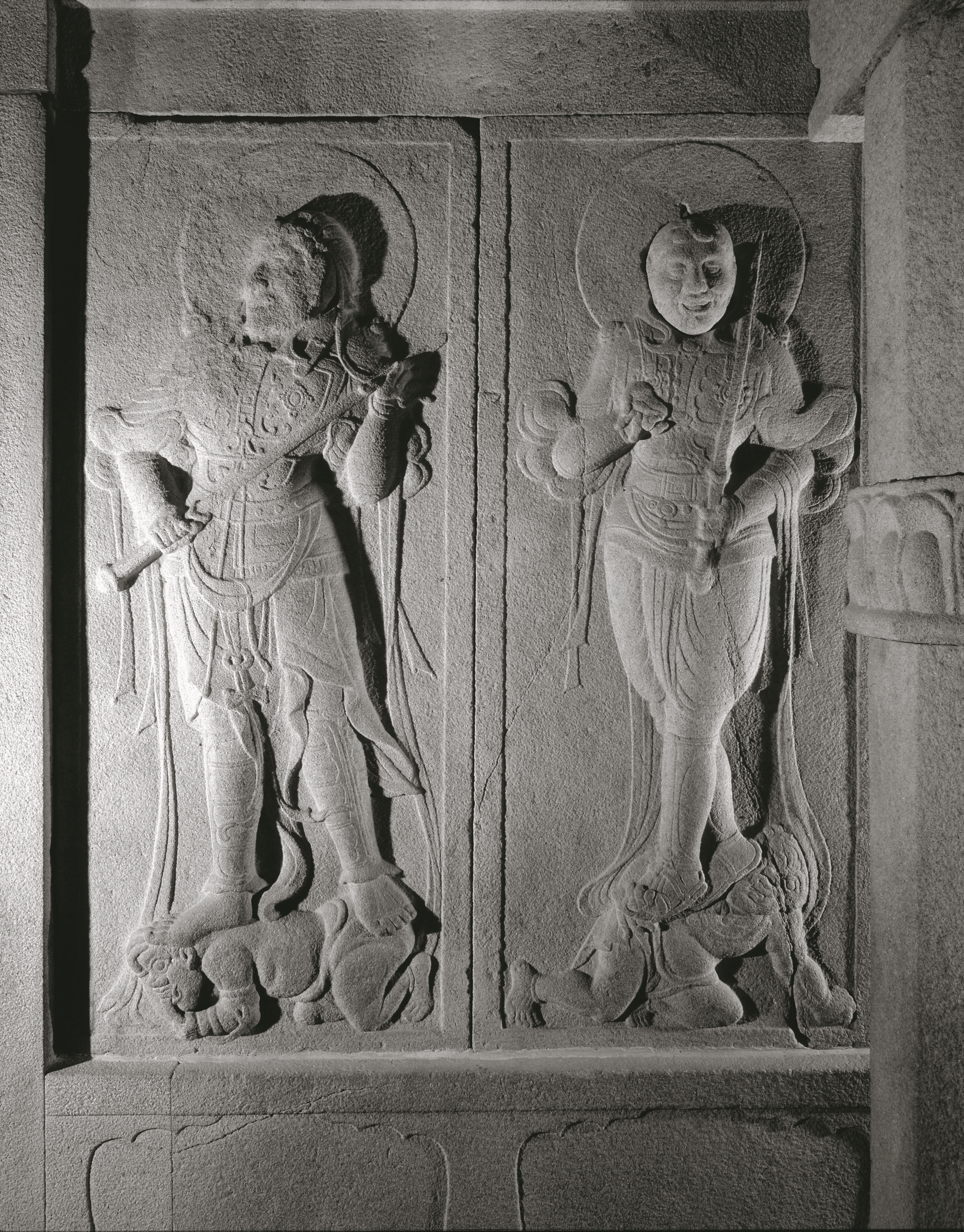
Relief sculpture

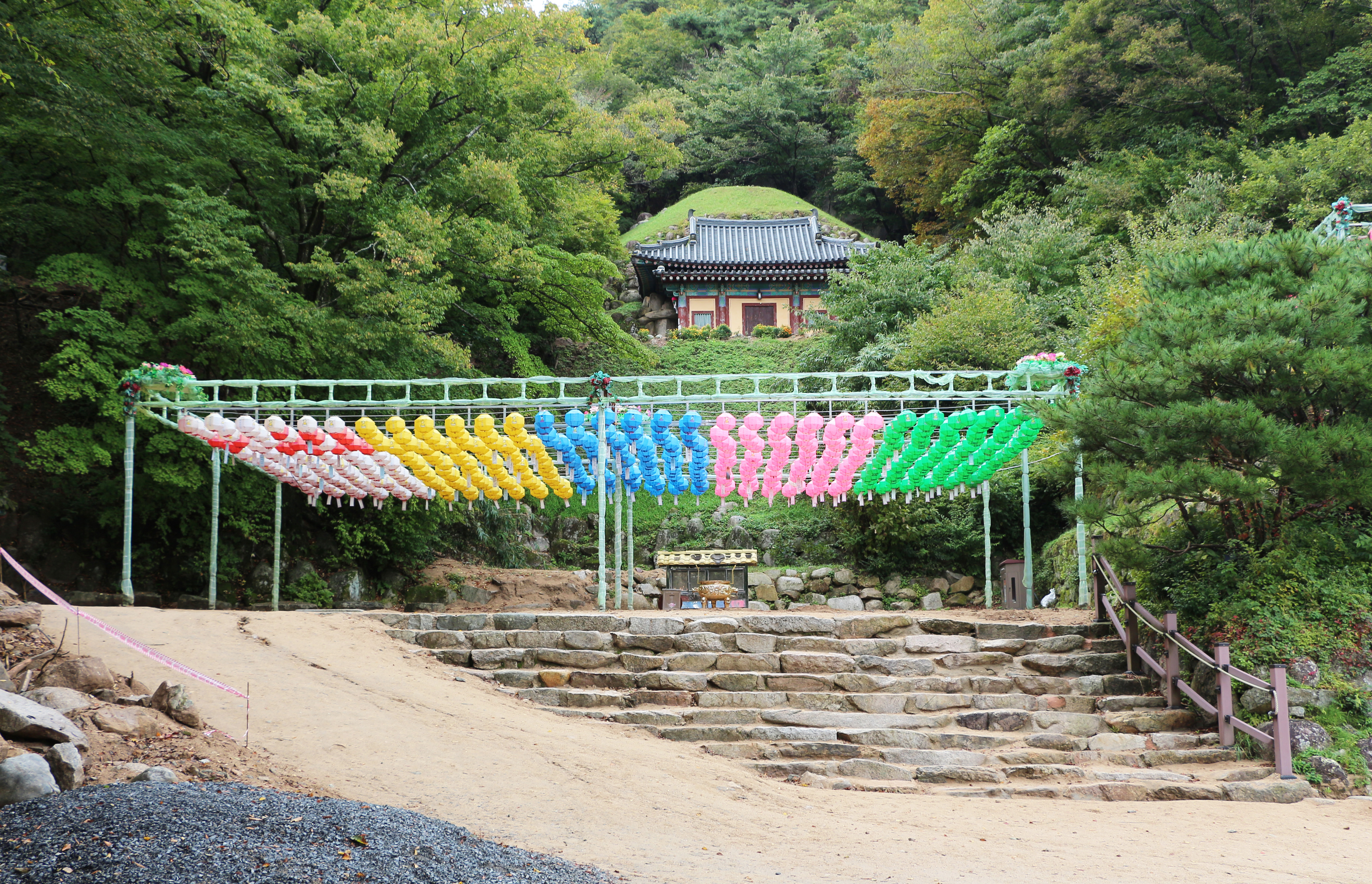
Outside the approach to the Grotto.

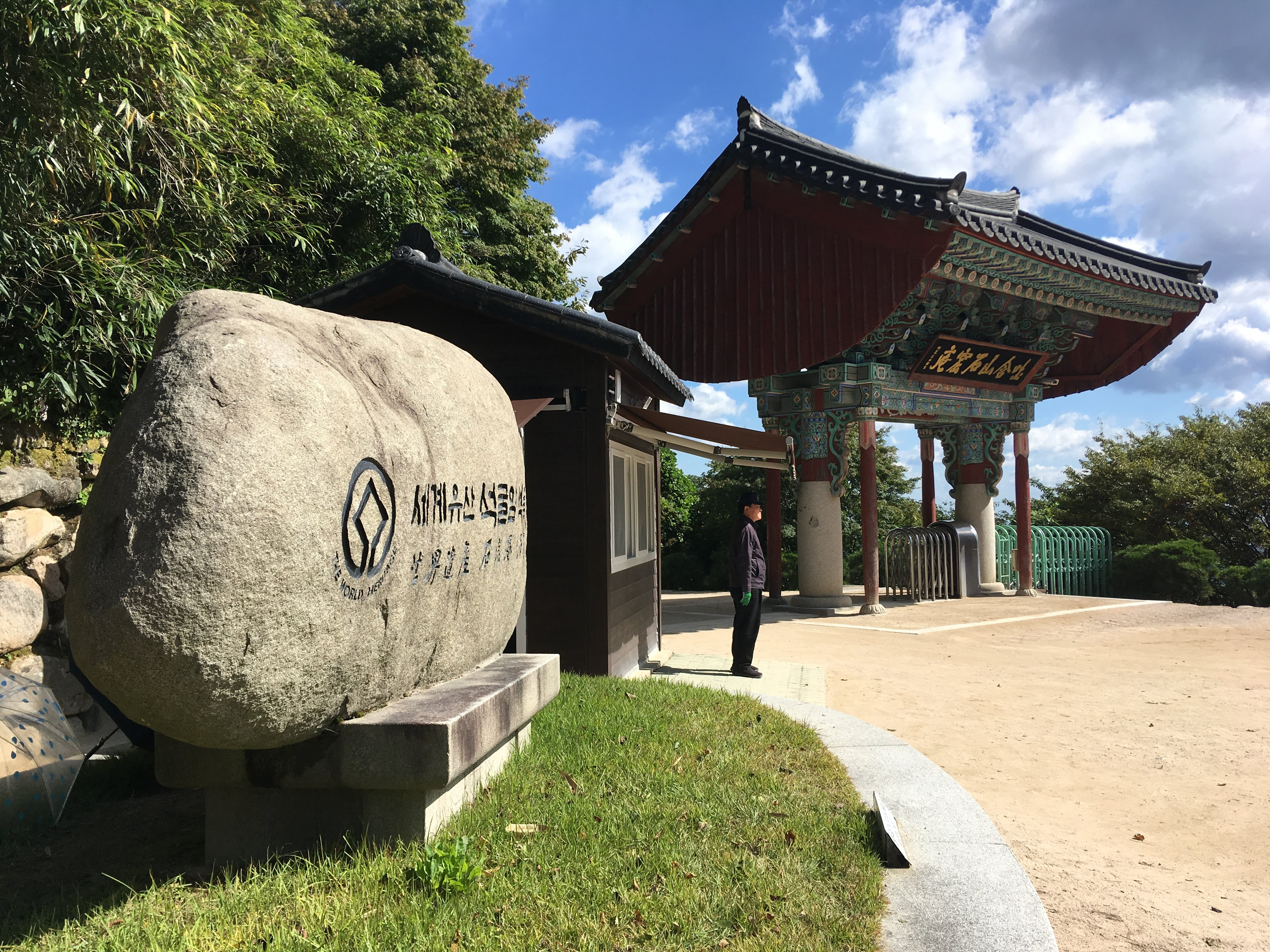
Iljumun gate at Seokguram

== See also ==
- List of Buddhist topics
- Korean Buddhist temples
- Tourism in Gyeongju
- National treasures of Korea
