= Gyeongju Basin =

- Hangul: 경주 분지
- Hanja: 慶州盆地
- RR: Gyeongju bunji
- MR: Kyŏngju punji

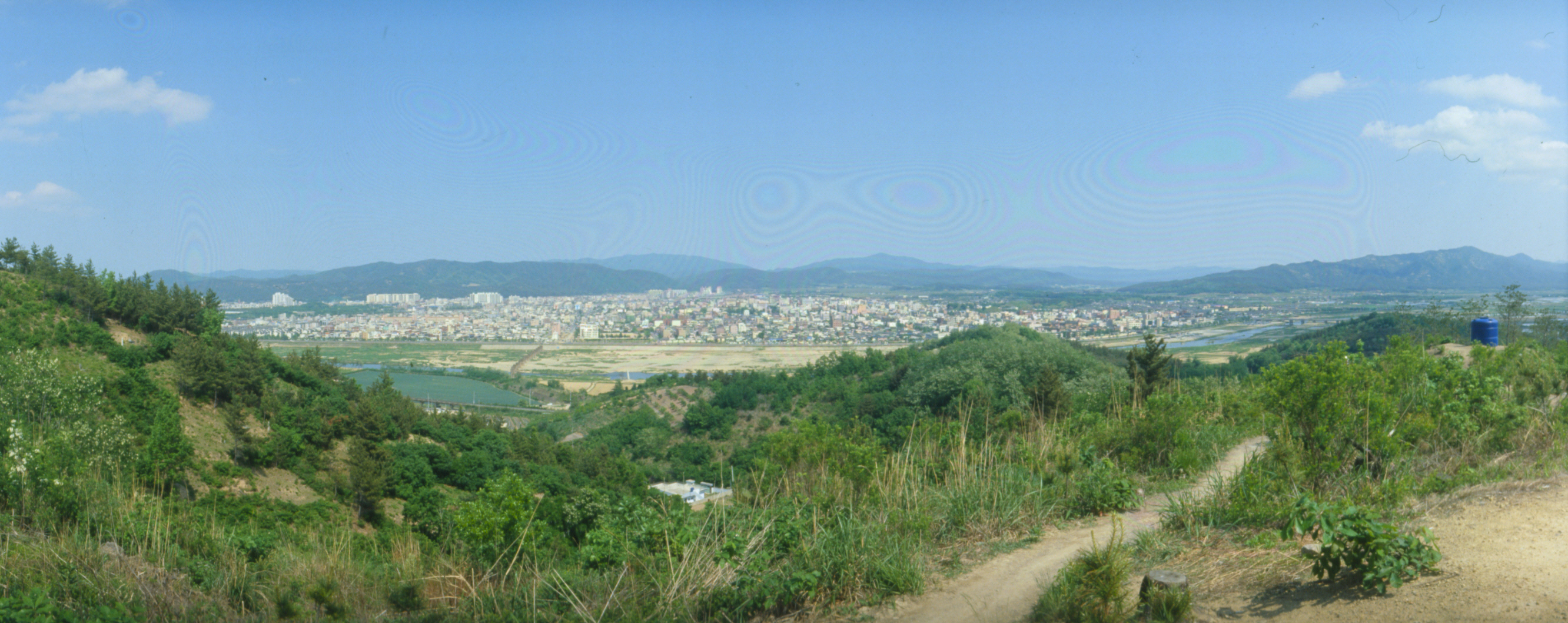
Panoramic view of Gyeongju city (and basin)

The Gyeongju Basin is a landform in Gyeongju city, North Gyeongsang province, South Korea. It forms part of the watershed of the Hyeongsan River, which flows north through the basin where it is joined by the Bukcheon, Namcheon, Daecheon, and Sogyeon-cheon streams.

The basin is surrounded by low mountains, most of which are also part of Gyeongju National Park. Specifically, it is bordered by Gowi Mountain (495 m above sea level) on the south, Seondo Mountain (380 m) and Ongnyeo Peak (215 m) on the west, and Gumi Mountain (594 m) on the north. Namsan, a mountain composed of two peaks (466 m, 495 m), cuts the Gyeongju Basin into two parts at the southern end. The streams that flow from these mountains have formed a number of interlinked alluvial plains in the Basin.

The city center of Gyeongju, which was also the capital of the ancient Silla kingdom, occupies much of the basin. Various watershed management projects were undertaken even during Silla times, due to continuous flooding in the basin, caused by runoff from the neighboring mountains combined with inflow from the upper Hyeongsan River watershed. The most recent severe flood took place in 1991.

The basin is also home to a great number of important Korean cultural heritage assets, mostly related to its ancient role as capital of Silla. For example, the royal tombs of Silla are located there, as is the Gyerim forest. The slopes of the entire Namsan Mountain are covered in religious and ceremonial sites dating from the Mumun Pottery Period (c. 1500-300 B.C.) to the end of the Korean Three Kingdoms (c. AD 668). Namsan and environs is registered as a UNESCO World Heritage Site.

Agriculture is also undertaken on a significant scale within the basin. The crops are primary staples such as rice, barley, and soybeans. The Gyeongju strain of rice grown here is particularly famous for its quality. However, the Gyeongju Basin has undergone significant environmental strain since the 1970s resulting the construction of tourist facilities, the expansion and industrialization of urban Gyeongju, intensive agriculture, and the construction and use of national public infrastructure such as expressways, highways, and high-speed rail.

== See also ==
- Geography of South Korea
