= Bulguksa =

Buddhist temple in Gyeongju, South Korea

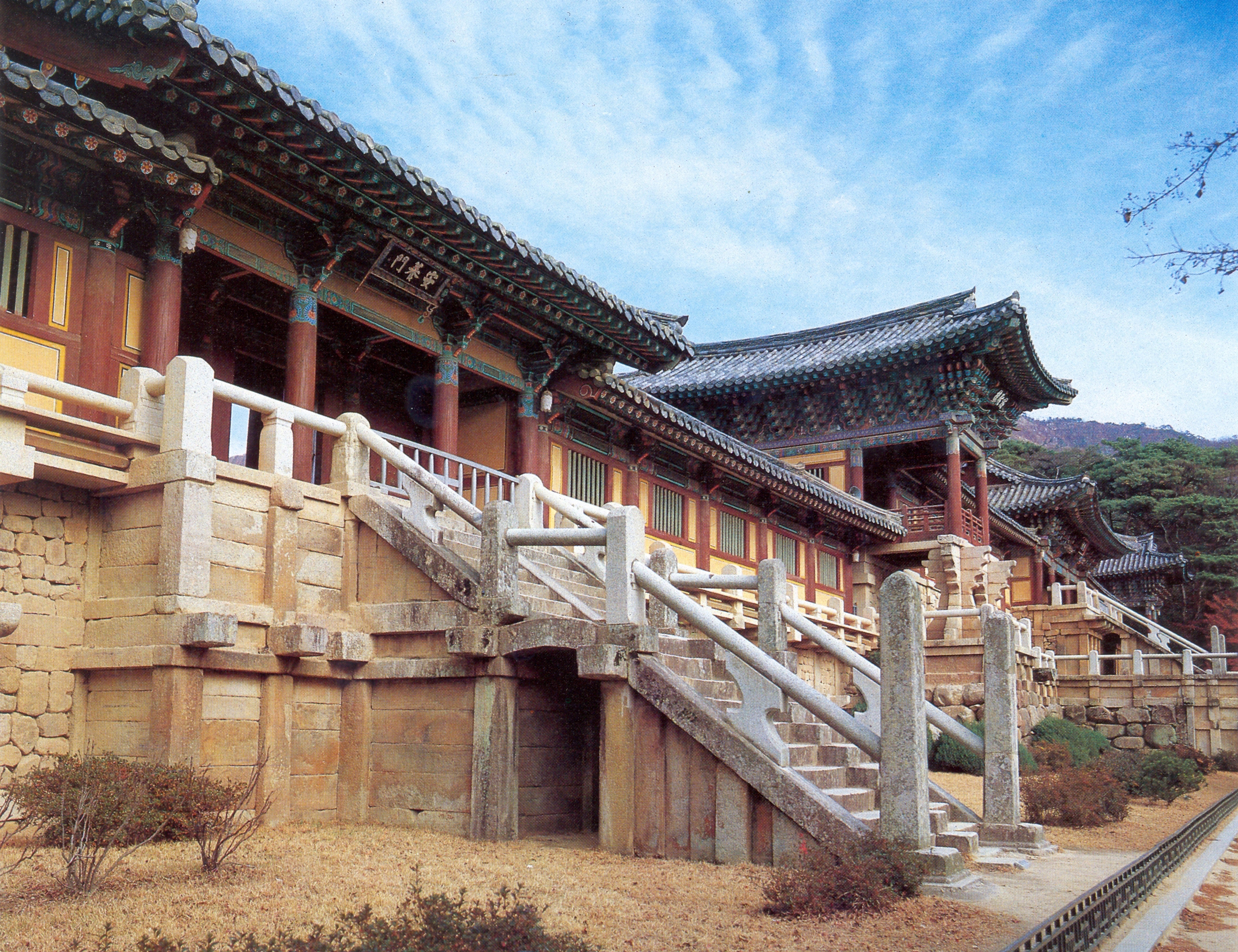

Religion
- Affiliation: Buddhism
- Sect: Jogye Order

Location
- Location: Gyeongju, South Korea
- Interactive map of Bulguksa
- Coordinates: 35°47′24″N 129°19′56″E

Architecture
- UNESCO World Heritage Site
- Official name: Bulguksa Temple
- Criteria: Cultural: i, iv
- Designated: 1995
- Parent listing: Seokguram Grotto and Bulguksa Temple
- Reference no.: 736
- Historic Sites of South Korea
- Official name: Bulguksa Temple, Gyeongju
- Designated: 2009-12-21
- Reference no.: Abolished

Website
- bulguksa.or.kr

Korean name
- Hangul: 불국사
- Hanja: 佛國寺
- RR: Bulguksa
- MR: Pulguksa

Bulguksa (Korean: 불국사) is a Buddhist temple on Tohamsan, in Jinhyeon-dong, Gyeongju, North Gyeongsang Province, South Korea.

It is a head temple of the Jogye Order of Korean Buddhism and contains six National Treasures, including the Dabotap and Seokgatap stone pagodas, Cheongun-gyo (Blue Cloud Bridge), and two gilt-bronze statues of Buddha. The temple is classified as a Historic Site by the South Korean government. In 1995, Bulguksa and the nearby Seokguram Grotto were added to the UNESCO World Heritage List.

The temple is considered as a masterpiece of the golden age of Buddhist art in the Silla kingdom. It is currently the head temple of the 11th district of the Jogye Order of Korean Buddhism.

Among the earliest woodblock prints in the world, a version of the Dharani sutra dated between 704 and 751 was found there in 1966. Its Buddhist text was printed on a 8 cm × 630 cm (3.1 in × 248.0 in) mulberry paper scroll.

== History ==
The temple's records state that a small temple was built on this site under King Beopheung in 528. The Samguk Yusa records that the current temple was constructed under King Gyeongdeok in 751, begun by chief minister Kim Daeseong to pacify the spirits of his parents. The building was completed in 774 by the Silla royal court, after Kim's death, and given its current name Bulguksa (Temple of the Buddha Land).

The temple was renovated during the Goryeo Dynasty and the early Joseon Dynasty. During the Imjin wars, the wooden buildings were burned to the ground. After 1604, reconstruction and expansion of Bulguksa started, followed by about 40 renovations until 1805.

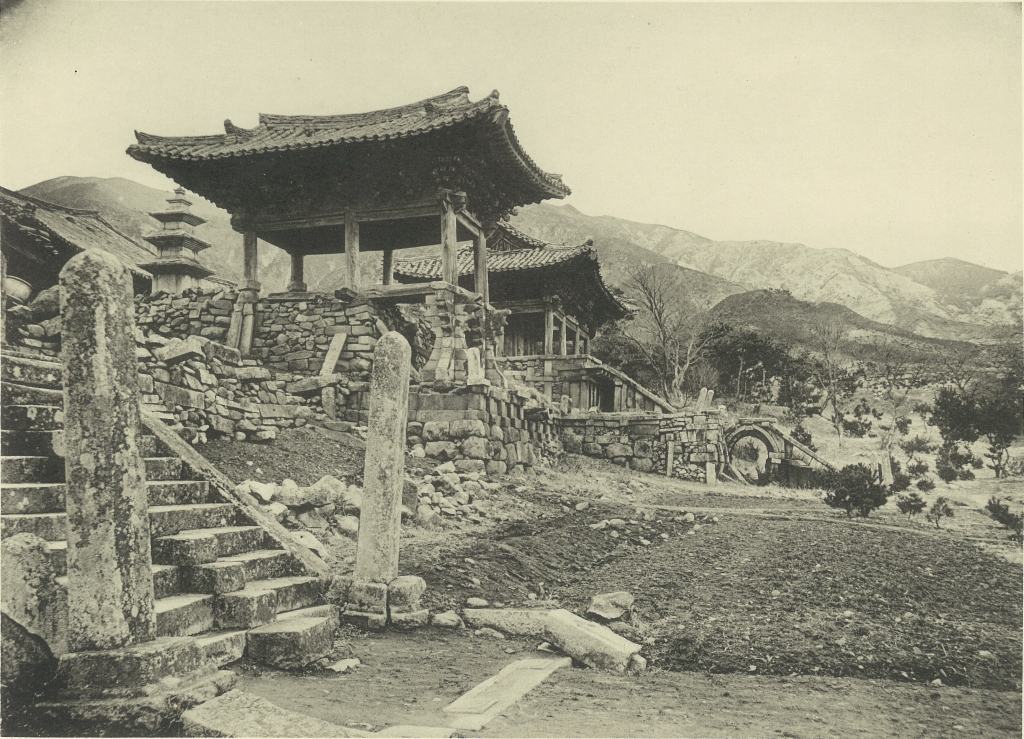
Ruins of Bulguksa in 1914, before restoration

After World War II and the Korean War, a partial restoration was conducted in 1966. Upon an extensive archeological investigation, major restoration was conducted between 1969 and 1973 by the order of President Park Chung Hee, bringing Bulguksa to its current form. The famous stone structures are preserved from the original Silla construction.

Hyun Jin-geon published a historical novel on the construction of the Seokgatap and Dabotap pagodas, which were the basis for the 1957 South Korean drama film Shadowless Pagoda.

== Structure ==
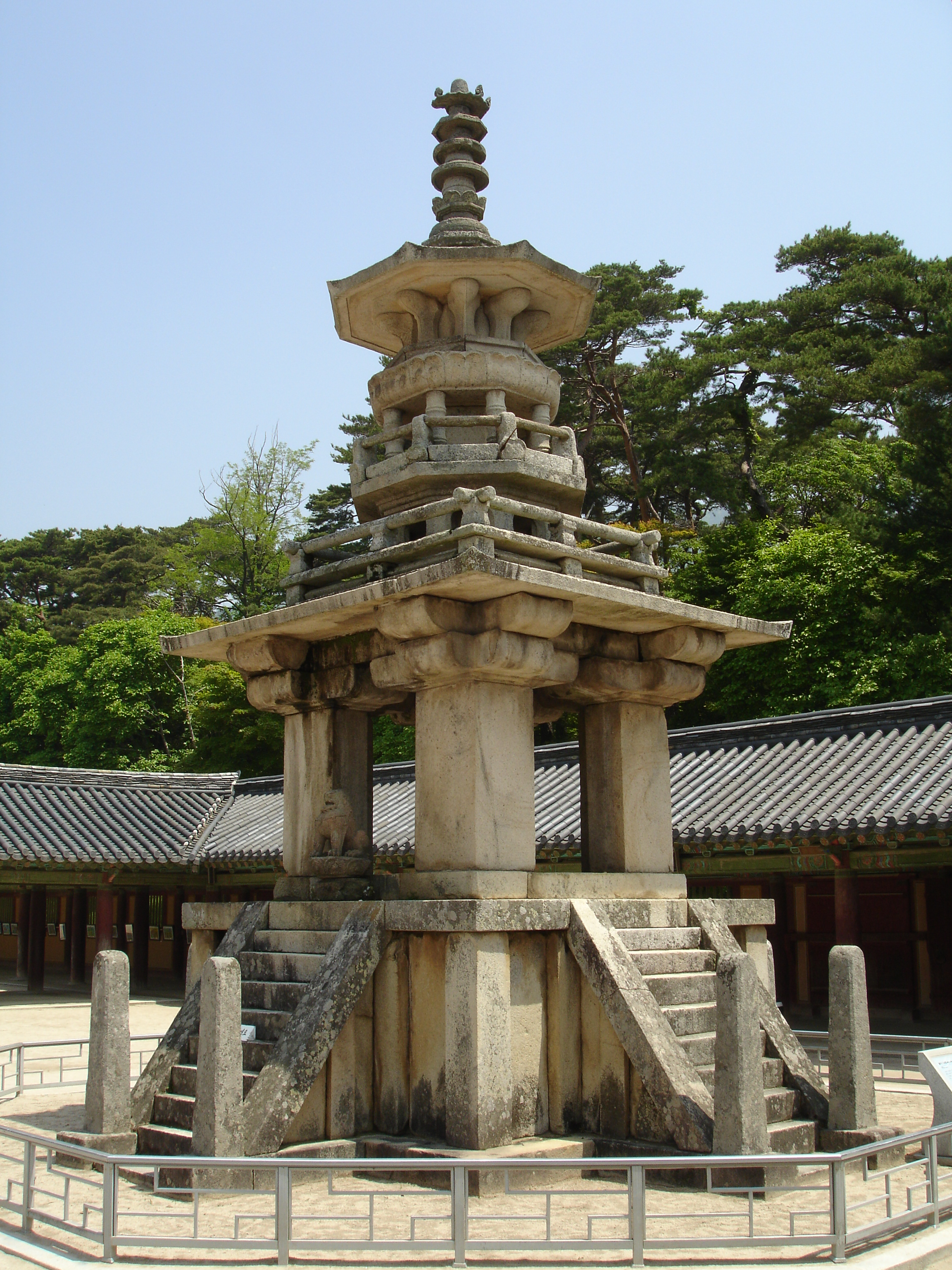
Dabotap

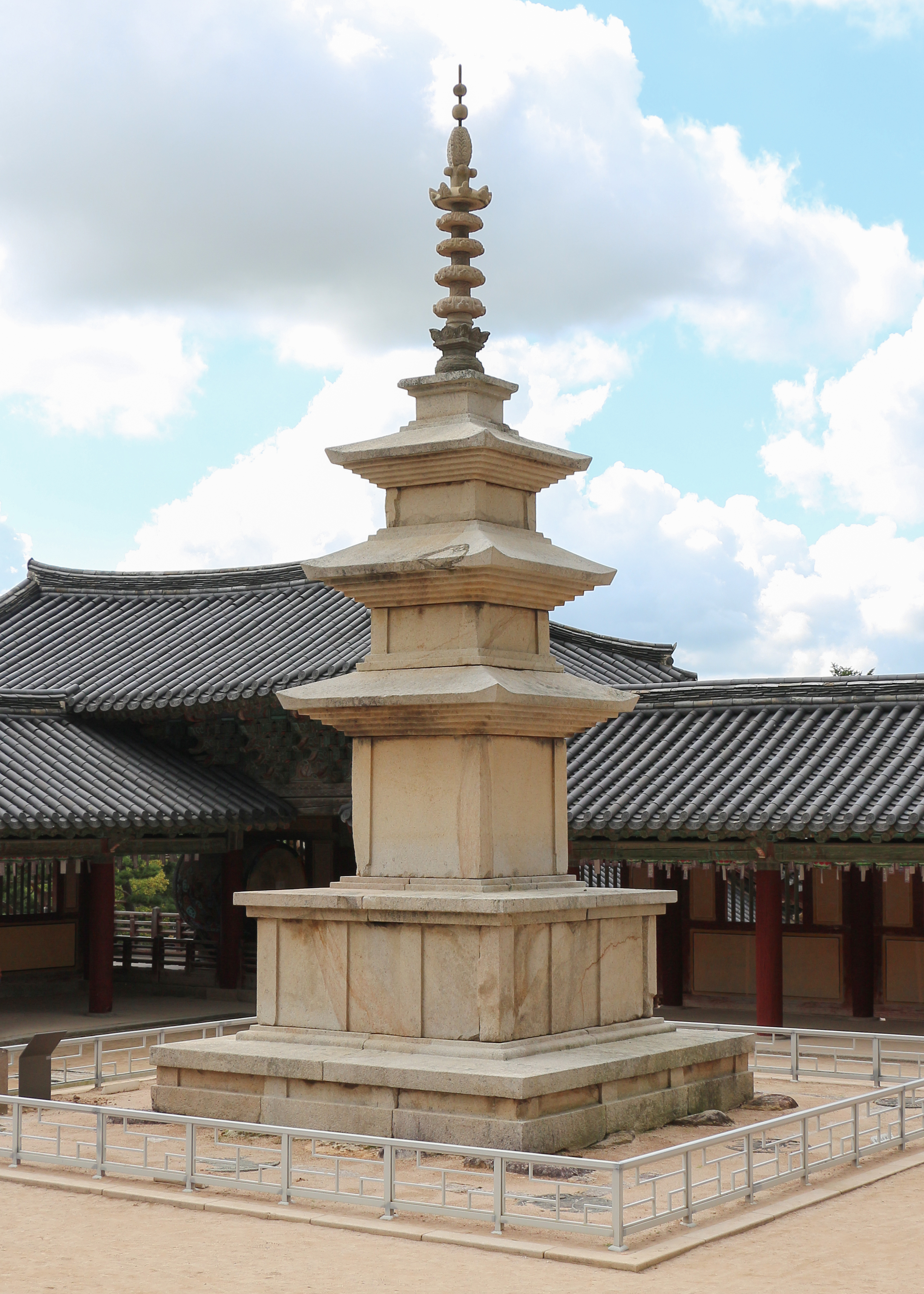
Seokgatap

The temple is located on the slopes of Tohamsan, in Jinheon-dong, Gyeongju.

The entrance to the temple has a double-sectioned staircase and bridge (National Treasure) that leads to the inside of the temple compound. The stairway is 34 steps high, corresponding to the 34 steps to enlightenment. The upper portion, Cheongungyo (Blue Cloud Bridge) is 6.3 meters long and has 16 steps. The lower portion, Baegungyo (White Cloud Bridge) is 5.4 meters and has 18 steps. The stairway leads to Jahamun (Mauve Mist Gate).

There are two pagodas on the temple site, which is unusual. Seokgatap (Three-story Stone Pagoda of Bulguksa Temple, 석가여래상주설법탑, 釋迦如來常住設法塔, 불국사 삼층석탑, 佛國寺 三層石塔), which stands 8.2 meters tall, is a traditional Korean-style stone pagoda with simple lines and minimal detailing. Seokgatap is over 13 centuries old. Dabotap (Many Treasure Pagoda) is 10.4 meters tall and dedicated to the Many Treasures Buddha mentioned in the Lotus Sutra. In contrast to Seokgatap, Dabotap is known for its highly ornate structure. Its image is reproduced on the South Korean 10 won coin. Dabotap and Seokgatap are Korean National Treasures, respectively.

The terrestrial and the two celestial abodes are manifested in Bulguksa: the terrestrial with a Shakyamuni Buddha Lotus Sutra, the celestial with Amitabha Buddha Avatamska Sutra. The large temple site is centred on two courts. One of the courts is centred on Daeungjeon, the hall which houses the Shakyamuni Buddha. The other is centred on Geungnakjeon, the hall of paradise where the Seven Treasure Bridge Chilbogyo is housed.

Daeungjeon (대웅전,大雄殿), the Hall of Great Enlightenment, is the main hall. Dabotap and Seokgatap stand before this hall. The hall enshrines the Sakyamuni Buddha and was first built in 681. Behind the main hall stands Museoljeon (무설전,無說殿), the Hall of No Words. This hall gets its name from the belief that Buddha's teachings could not be taught by mere words alone. It is one of the oldest buildings in the complex and was probably first built in 670. The Gwaneumjeon (Avalokitesvara's Shrine, 관음전,觀音殿) houses an image of the Avalokitesvara, the Bodhisattva of Perfect Compassion, and stands at the highest point of the complex. The Birojeon (Vairocana Buddha Hall, 비로전,毘盧殿), which sits below the Gwaneumjeon, houses the Gilt-bronze Seated Vairocana Buddha while the Geuknakjeon (Hall of Supreme Bliss, 극락전), standing near the main compound, houses the Gilt-bronze Seated Amitabha Buddha.

Map of the main complex

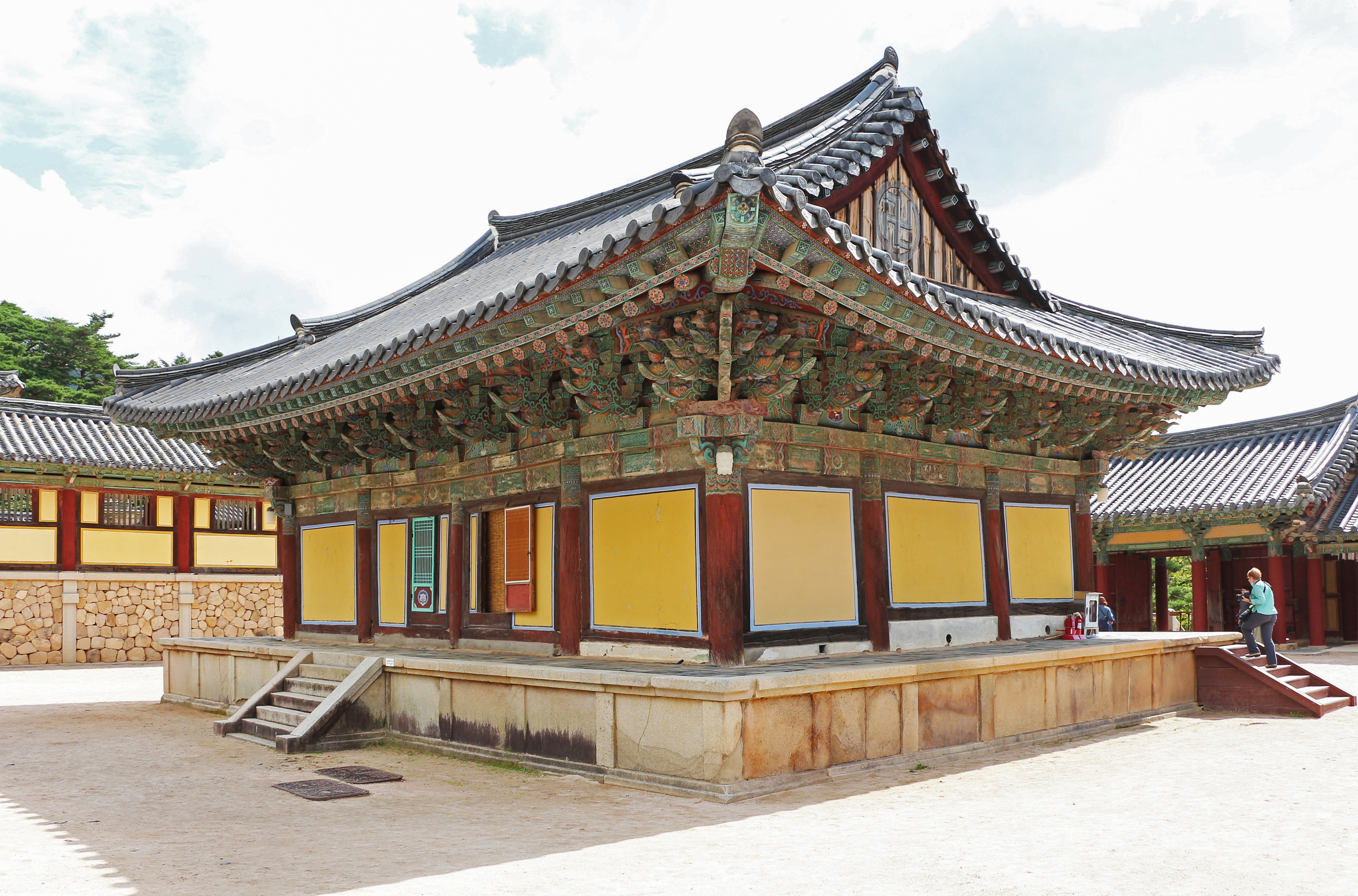
Daeungjeon, Main Hall

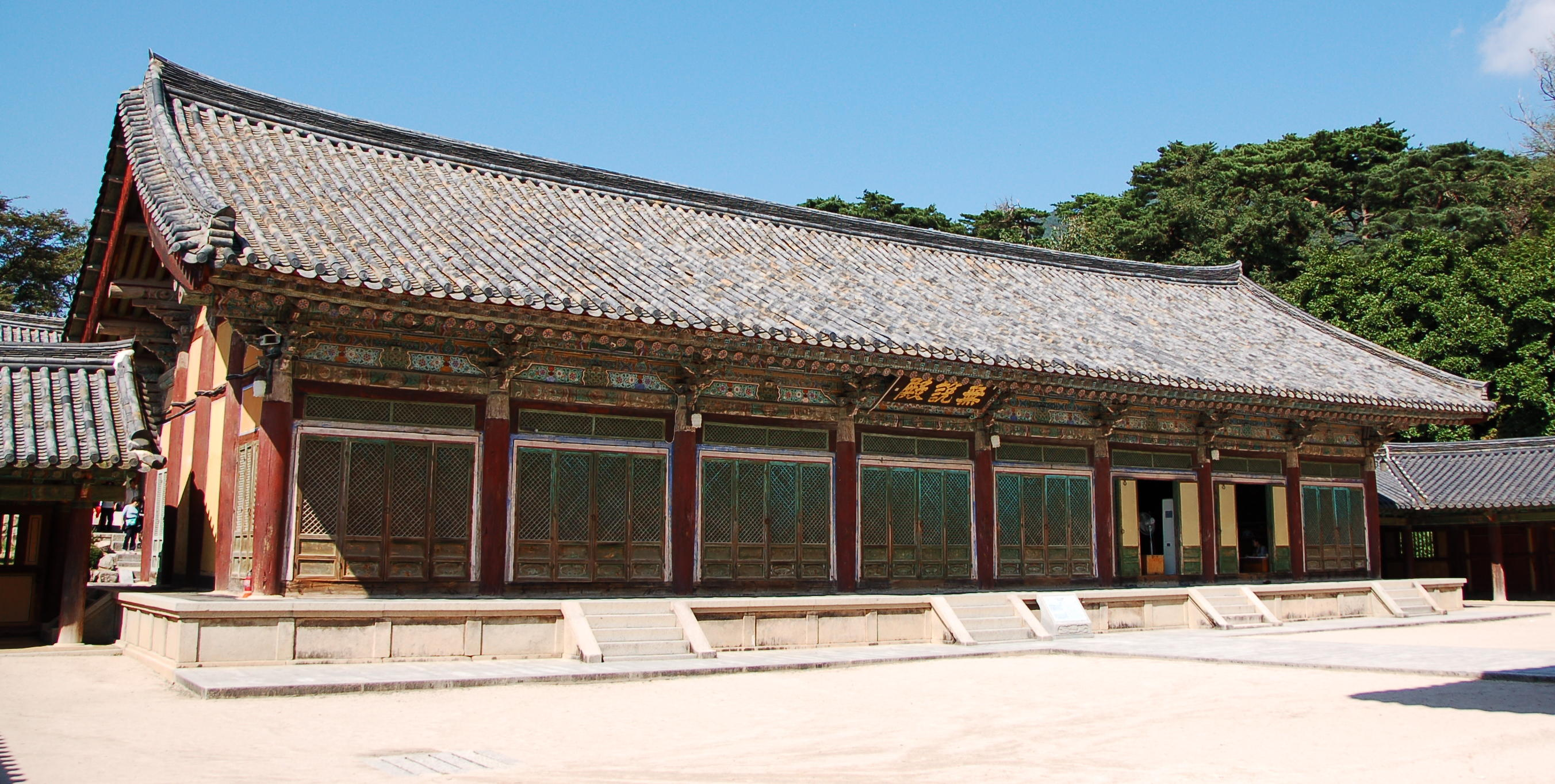
Museoljeon, Hall of No Words

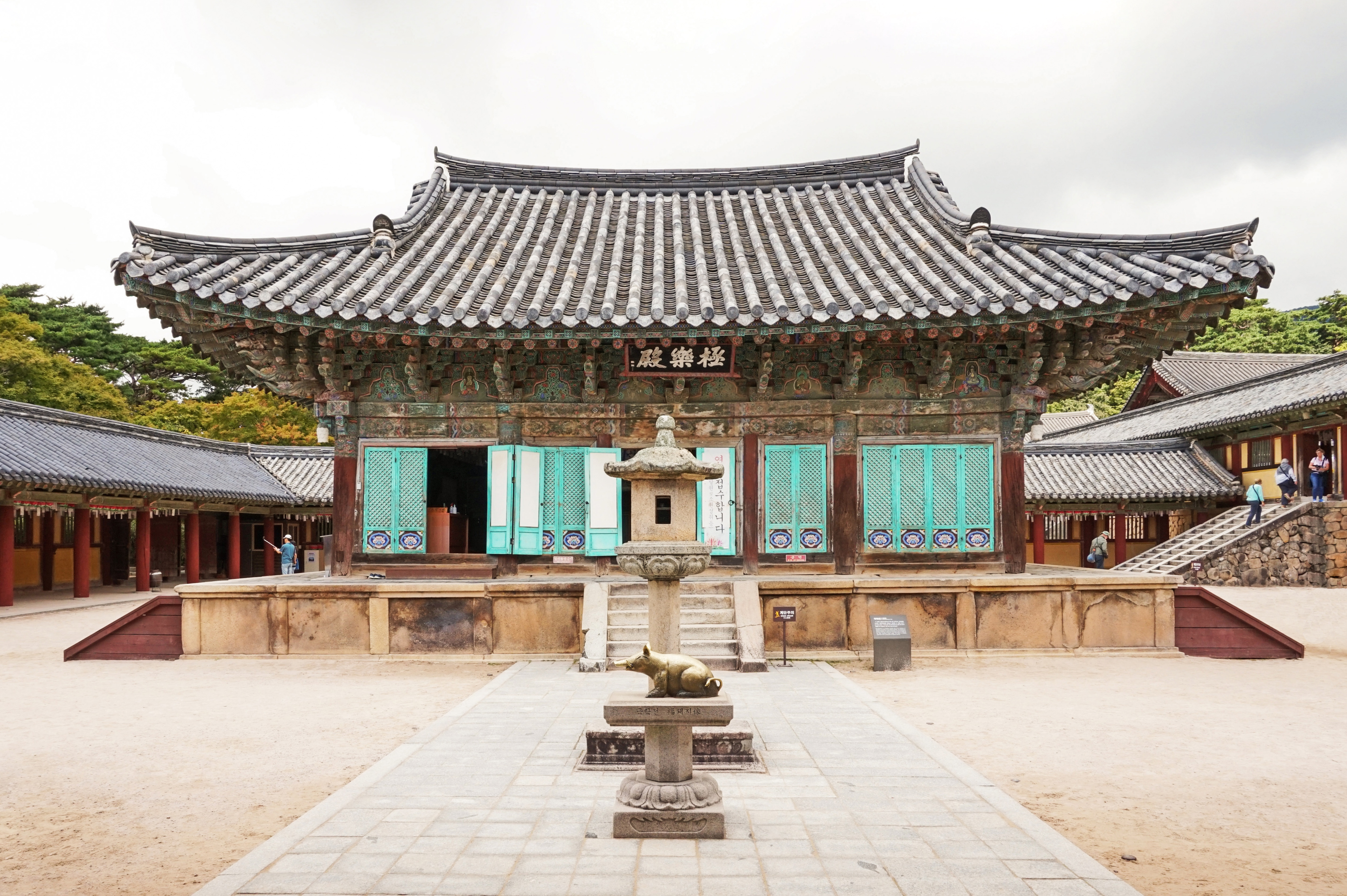
Geugnakjeon, Hall of Supreme Bliss

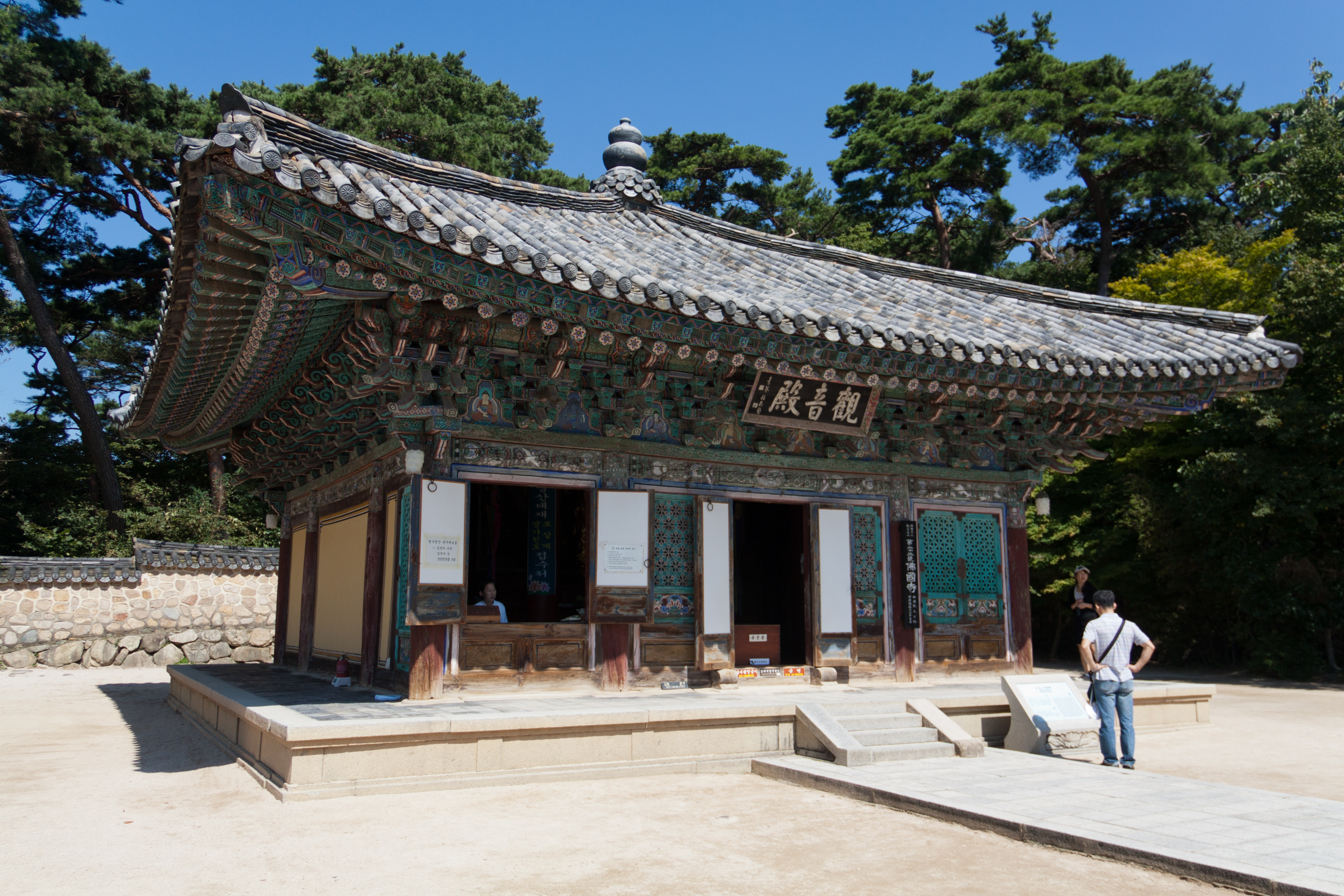
Gwaneumjeon, Avalokitesvara's Shrine

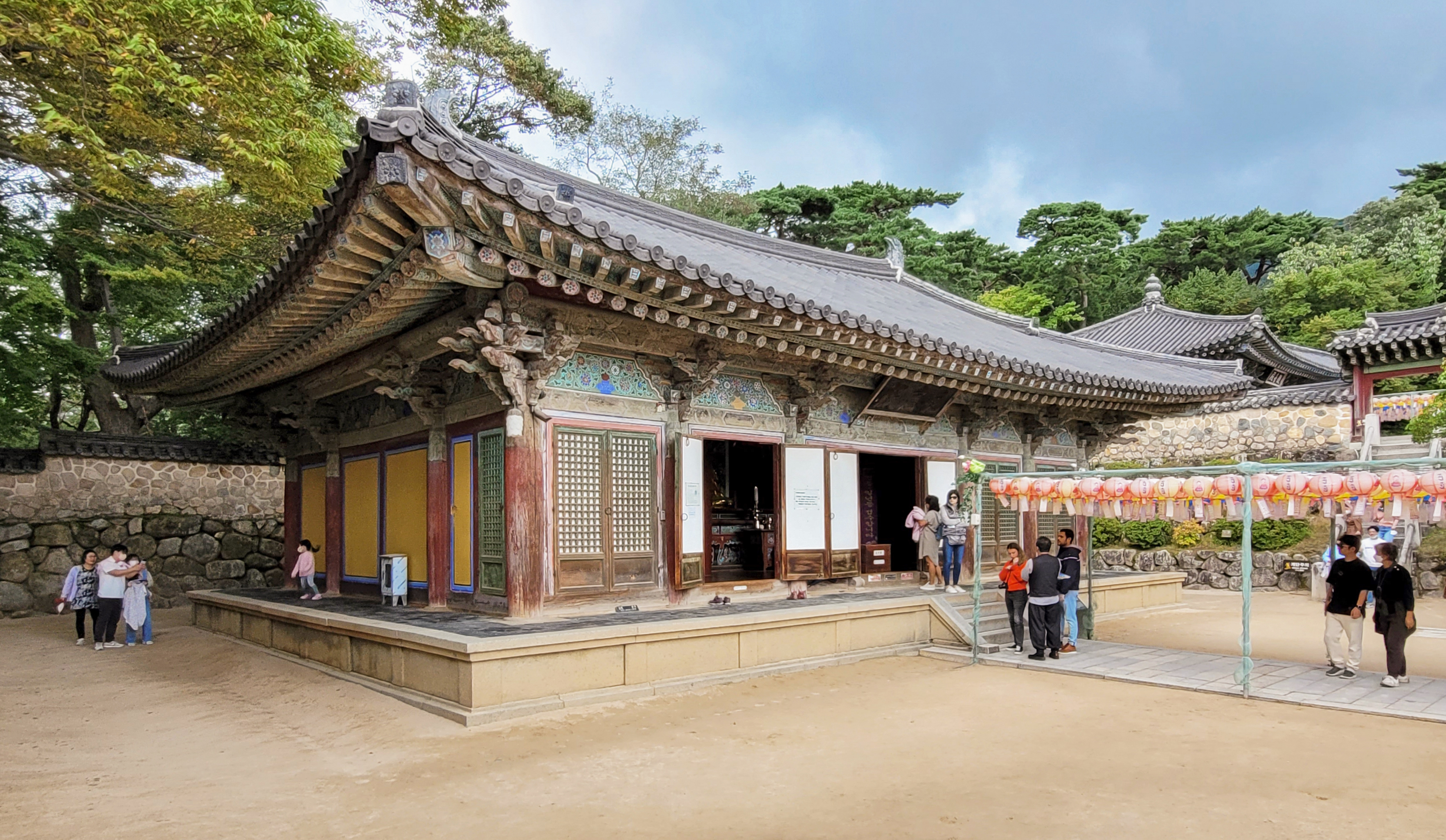
Birojeon

=== Official treasures ===
==== National Treasure (Dabotap Pagoda and Three-story Stone Pagoda) ====
The two famous stone pagodas, Dabotap and Seokgatap reside in the main courtyard of the Bulguksa Temple complex. They were designated as National Treasures on December 20, 1962.

==== National Treasure (Yeonhwagyo and Chilbogyo Bridges) ====
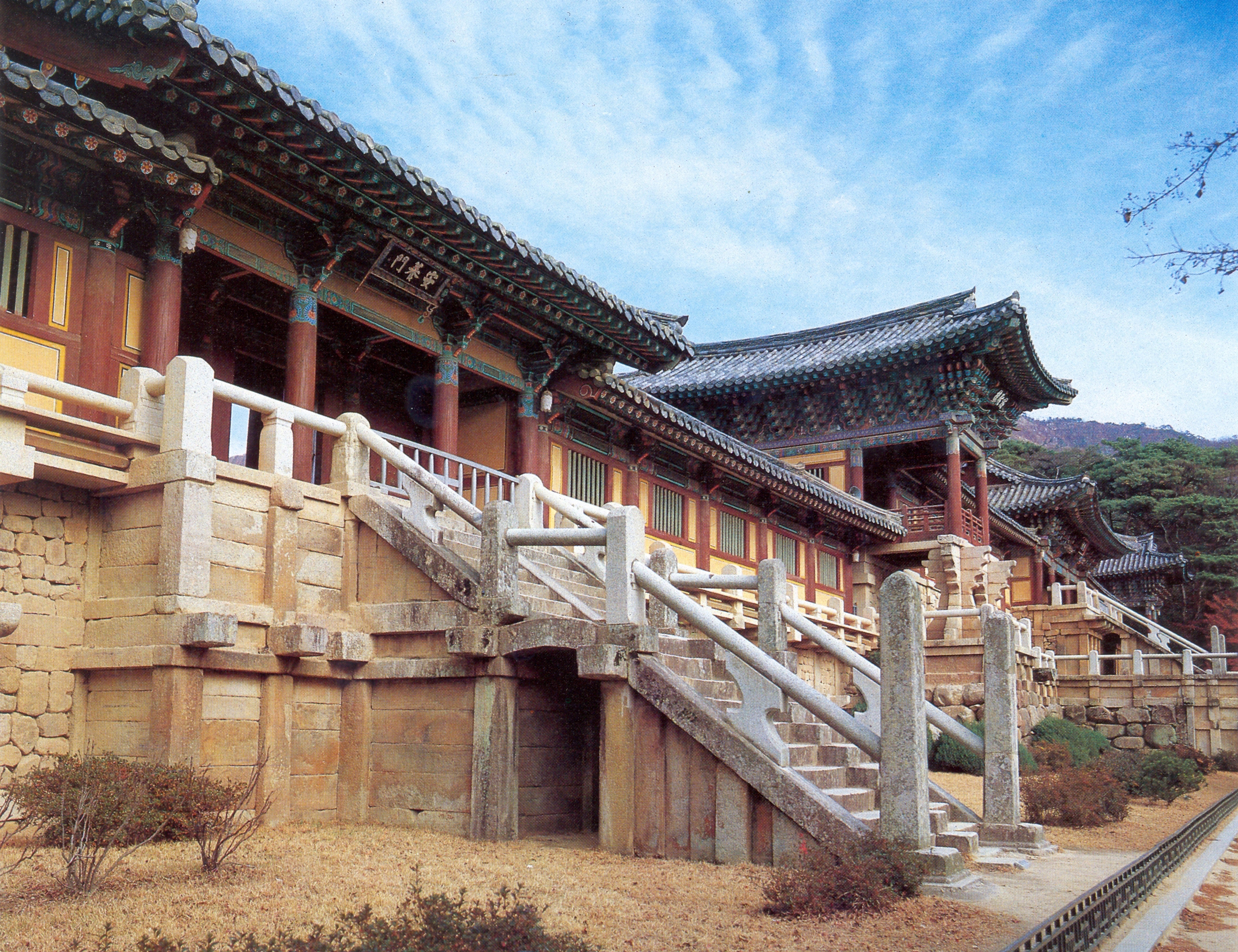
Yeonhwagyo and Chilbogyo

The Yeonhwagyo (Lotus Flower Bridge, 연화교,蓮華橋) and Chilbogyo (Seven Treasures Bridge, 칠보교,七寶橋) are a pair of bridges at Bulguksa. This bridges were designated as a national treasure on December 20, 1962. The bridges lead to Anyangmun (Peace Enhancing Gate, 안양문,安養門) leading to Geuknakjeon (the Hall of the Pure Land). This pair were built at the same time as their brother bridges, the Cheongungyo and Baegungyo Bridges.

These pair of bridges share the 45 degree incline, arch underneath, and the combination bridge/staircase design of their brother bridges. However, one noticeable difference is that this bridge is smaller. The lower Lotus Flower Bridge has 10 steps while the upper Seven Treasures Bridge contains 8 steps. This bridge is on the west in relation to the Blue Cloud and White Cloud Bridges. The Lotus Flower Bridge is known for its delicate carvings of Lotus Flowers on each step but these have faded with the weight of many pilgrims. Today, visitors are restricted from walking on the bridge.

=== National Treasure (Cheongungyo and Baegungyo Bridges) ===
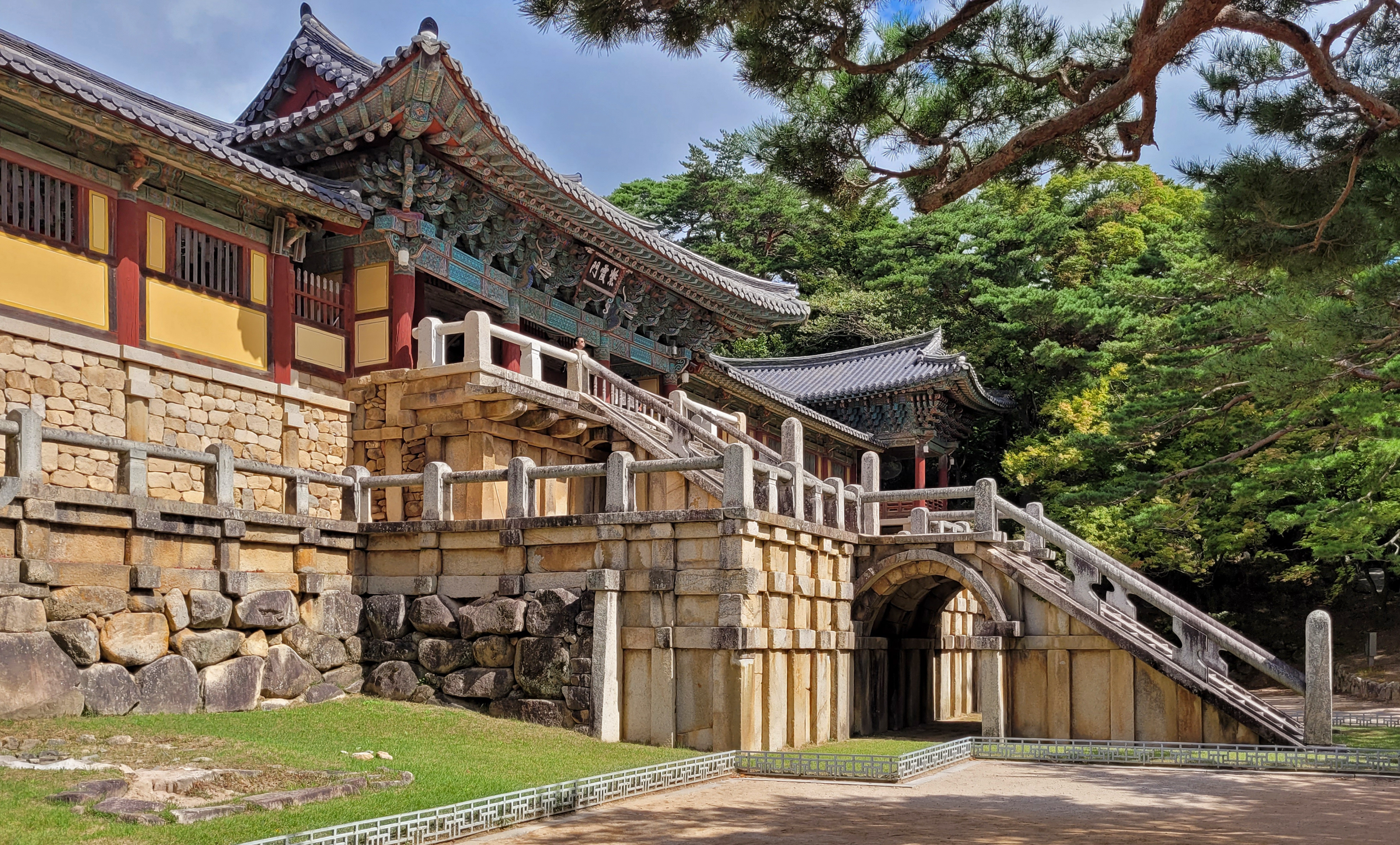
Cheongungyo and Baegungyo

The Cheongungyo (Blue Cloud Bridge, 청운교,靑雲橋) and Baegungyo (White Cloud Bridge, 백운교,白雲橋) Bridges of Bulguksa Temple are two bridges that are a part of a stairway that leads to the temple. The bridges were probably built in 750 during the reign of King Gyeongdeok. Although built separately, they are designated together as one single national treasure. They were designated as a national treasure on December 20, 1962.

The Blue Cloud Bridge makes up the upper span of the stair while the White Cloud Bridge is the lower part. The bridges lead to the Jahamun (Golden Purple Gate, 자하문,紫霞門) which leads to Sakyamuni Hall. There are 34 steps on the stairway, which slopes at a 30-degree angle. The upper Blue Cloud Bridge has sixteen steps while the lower White Cloud Bridge has eighteen. The semicircular rainbow-shaped arch (hongye) beneath the stairway is the oldest of its kind in Korea and is regarded as an important example of the early form of the stone arch bridges and arched gateways later used in the country.

=== National Treasure (Gilt-bronze Seated Vairocana Buddha) ===
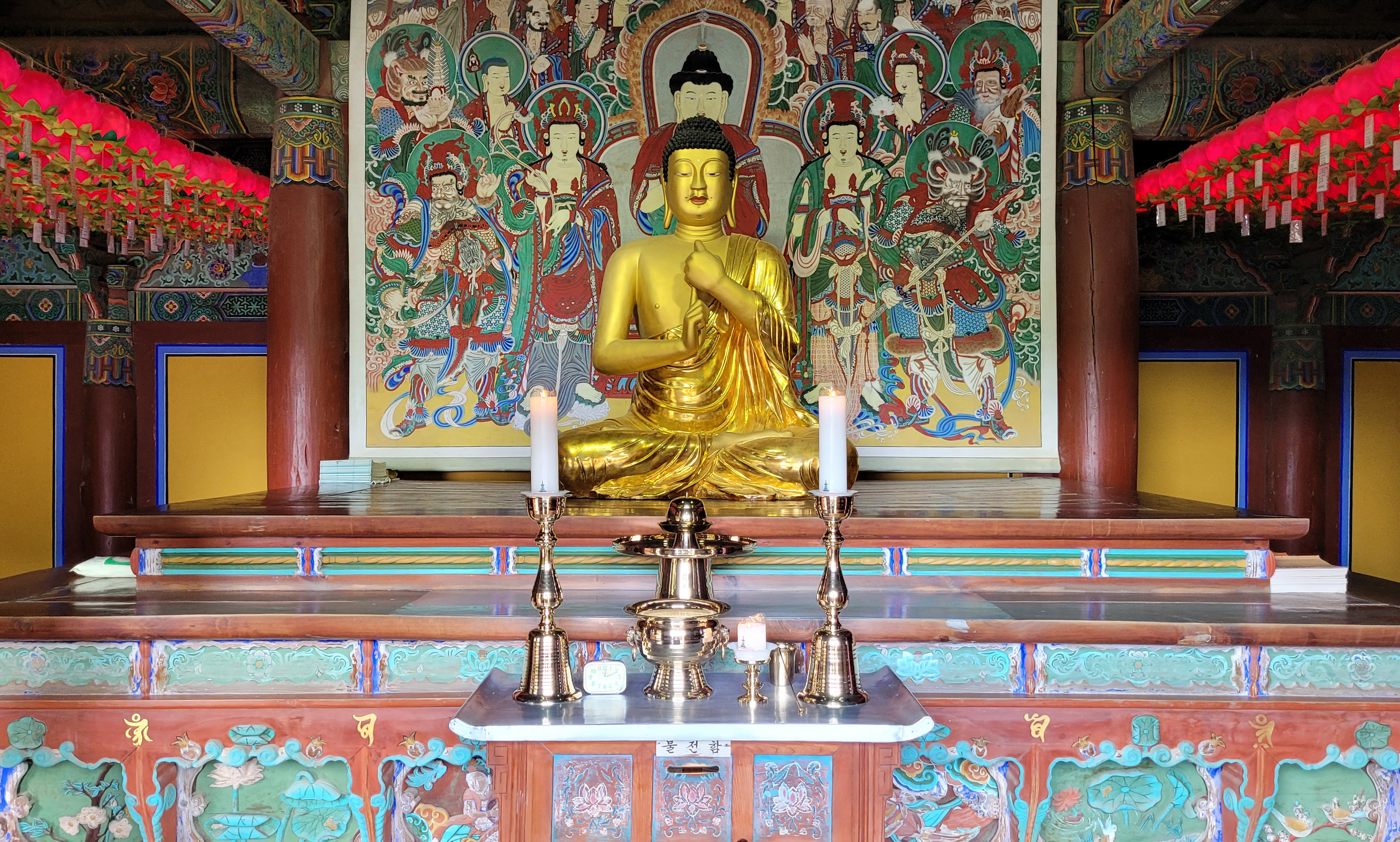
Gilt-bronze Seated Vairocana Buddha

The Gilt-bronze Seated Vairocana Buddha of Bulguksa Temple (경주 불국사 금동비로자나불좌상, 慶州 佛國寺 金銅毘盧遮那佛坐像, Gyeongju Bulguksa geumdong birojana buljwasang), was designated as a National Treasure on December 20, 1962.

The Buddha of Enlightenment is enshrined in the Birojeon. It is 1.77 meters in height and made from gilt-bronze. The head of the Buddha has an usnisa, a symbol of supreme wisdom. The head of the Buddha was made by fusing two shells to each other and the face is elongated and soft. The robes of the Buddha are highly detailed and the simulation of folded cloth rippling down from the shoulder to the lap is done with high skill. The hands of the Buddha are in a position, the right index finger covered by the left hand, which often is used to symbolize the Buddha of Enlightenment. The figure is estimated to be from the 9th century due to stylistic evidence, including the overly wide lap and the lack of tension in the depiction of the robes and face of the Buddha.

=== National Treasure (Gilt-bronze Seated Amitabha Buddha) ===
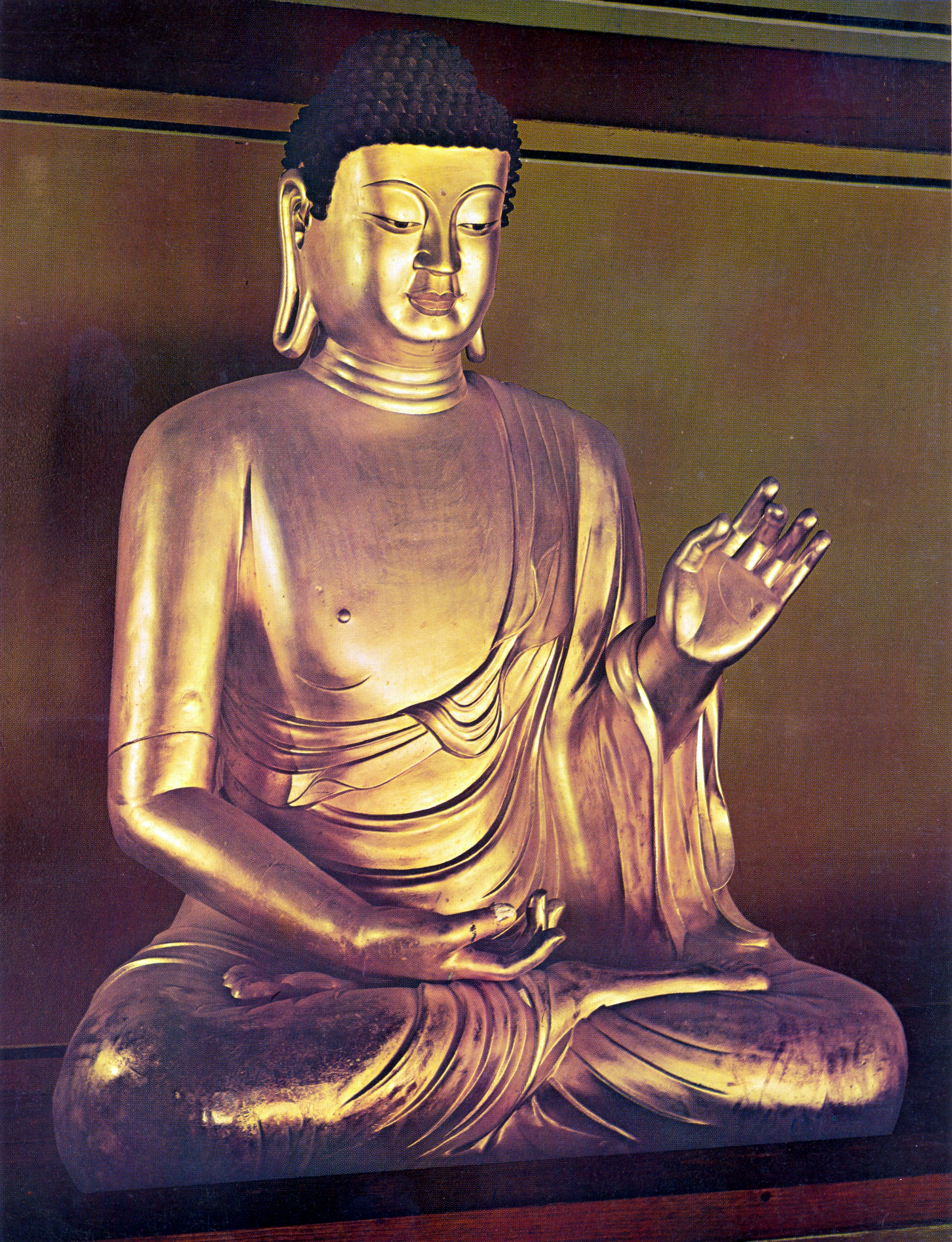
Gilt-bronze Seated Amitabha Buddha

The Gilt-bronze Seated Amitabha Buddha of Bulguksa Temple (경주 불국사 금동아미타여래좌상, 慶州 佛國寺 金銅阿彌陀如來坐像, Gyeongju Bulguksa geumdong amita yeoraejwasang), was designated as a National Treasure on December 20, 1962.

The Amitabha Buddha statue is 1.66 meters in height and enshrined in Geuknakjeon. This gilt-bronze statue was probably cast in the late 8th or early part of the 9th century and it shares the style of the Gilt-bronze Seated Vairocana Buddha. The head of the statue is made by fixing two shell-like pieces together. The face has a distinctively aquiline nose. The Buddha has broad shoulders and strong chest while the large lap gives the figure a sense of proportional harmony and stability. The style of the robe seems to be more stylized and haphazard. The position of the left hand raised at shoulder-level palm forward and the right hand is placed at the lap. The style of the Buddha seems to follow an abstract and stylized tradition rather than a representation of realism.

=== Treasure (Stupa of Bulguksa Temple) ===
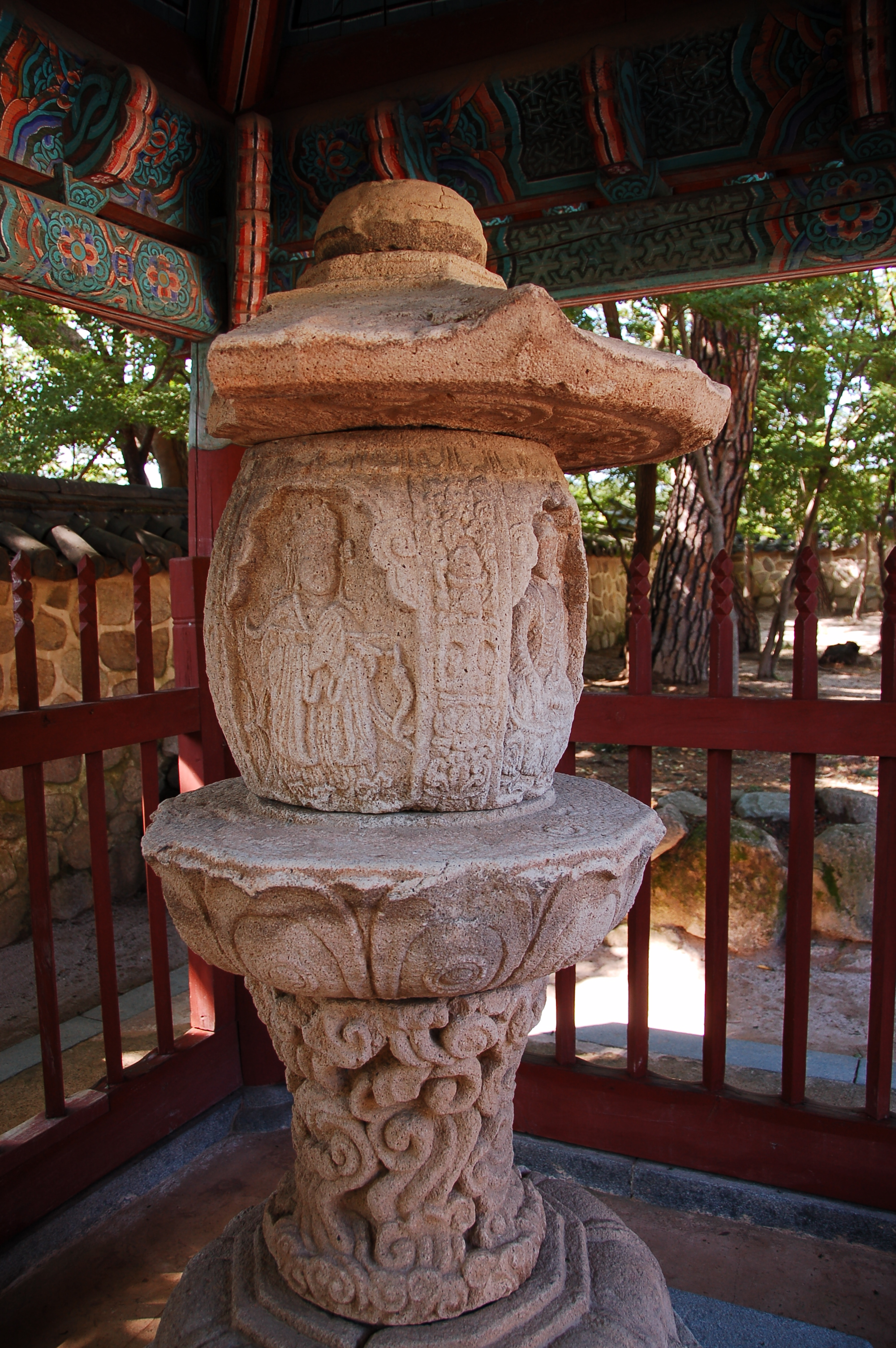
Stupa of Bulguksa Temple

This sarira pagoda (사리탑), or stupa, looks like a stone lantern. It stands 2.1 meters tall and is located at the left side of the front garden of Birojeon. The artifact was at one point taken to Japan in 1906 but was returned in 1933. It is from the Goryeo Dynasty, but shows the influence of Silla Dynasty art.

A sarira is a container for the relics or remains of famous priests or royalty. It is said that this sarira contained the remains of eight priests or a queen. The three main features of the piece are the foundation stone, the main body, and the ornamental top. The foundation is an octagonal stone decorated with carvings. Atop this foundation is a circular stone incised with lotus motifs. The pillar supports of the main body are carved with a cloud motif while the main body is cylindrical and has four bas-reliefs of Buddha and bodhisattvas and are accompanied by flower motifs. The top of the pagoda has twelve sides which meet into a hexagonal shape.

== See also ==
- Korean Buddhist temples
- List of South Korean tourist attractions
- List of Buddhist topics
- Tourism in Gyeongju
