= Dongdaesan (Gangwon) =

Mountain in South Korea

Highest point
- Elevation: 1,433.5 m (4,703 ft)

Geography
- Location: South Korea

Korean name
- Hangul: 동대산
- Hanja: 東臺山
- RR: Dongdaesan
- MR: Tongdaesan

Deokhangsan (Korean: 동대산) is a mountain in Odaesan National Park in Pyeongchang County and Gangneung, Gangwon Province, South Korea. It has an elevation of 1,433.5 m (4,703 ft).

== See also ==
- List of mountains in Korea
