= Dongdaesan (Ulsan) =

Mountain in Ulsan, South Korea

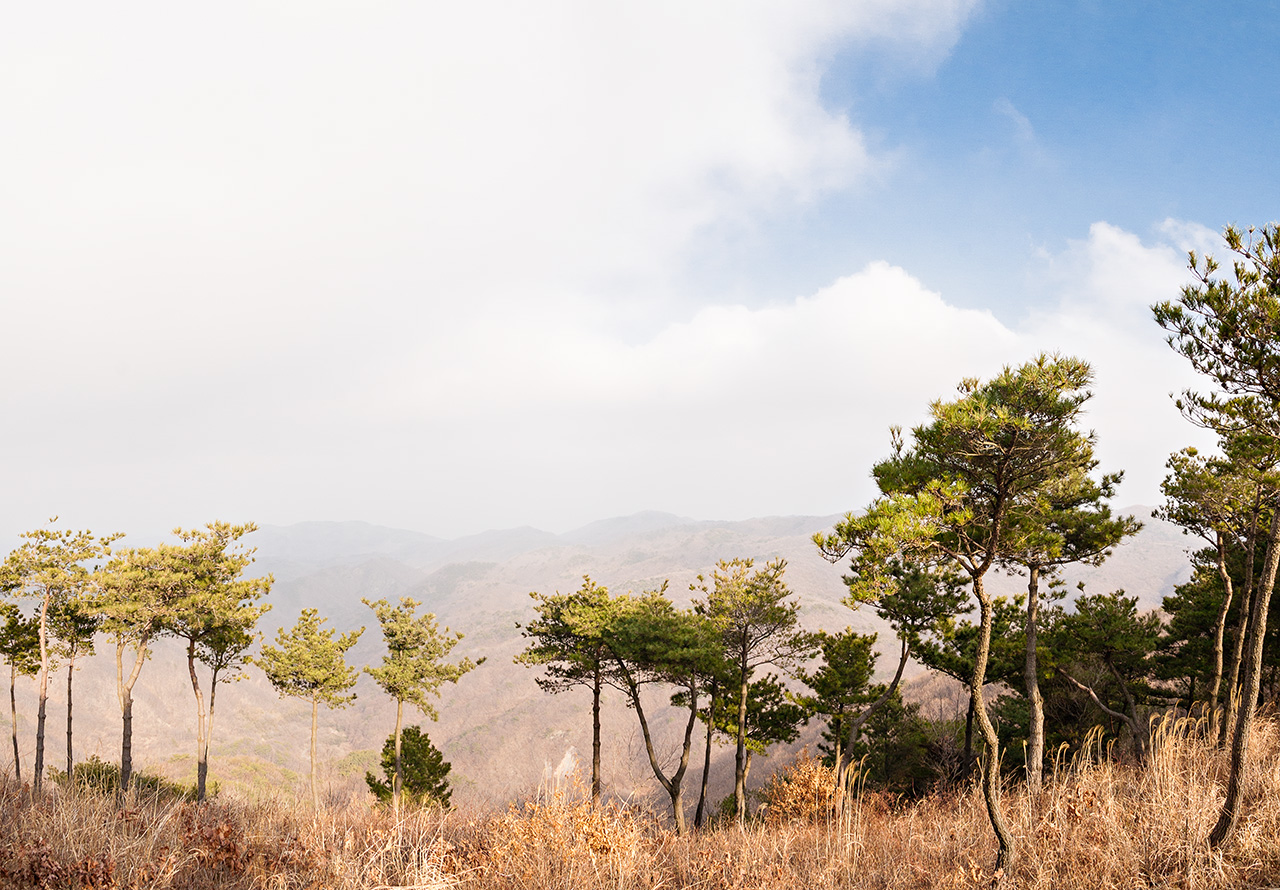
- View from the top of Dongdaesan

Highest point
- Elevation: 447 m (1,467 ft)
- Coordinates: 35°38′10″N 129°22′44″E

Geography
- Location: Ulsan, South Korea

Korean name
- Hangul: 동대산
- Hanja: 東大山
- RR: Dongdaesan
- MR: Tongdaesan

Dongdaesan is a mountain located in Daean-dong, Buk District, Ulsan, South Korea. It has an elevation of 447 m (1,467 ft). On the top of a mountain is a 2.5-meter-tall (8.2 ft) monument that reads "Our wish is reunification" (우리의 소원은 통일), referring to the reunification of the Korean Peninsula.

== See also ==
- Dongdaesan (disambiguation)
- Geography of Korea
- List of mountains in Korea
- List of mountains by elevation
