= Gyeongju National Park =

Park in North Gyeongsang Province, South Korea

- IUCN category II (national park)
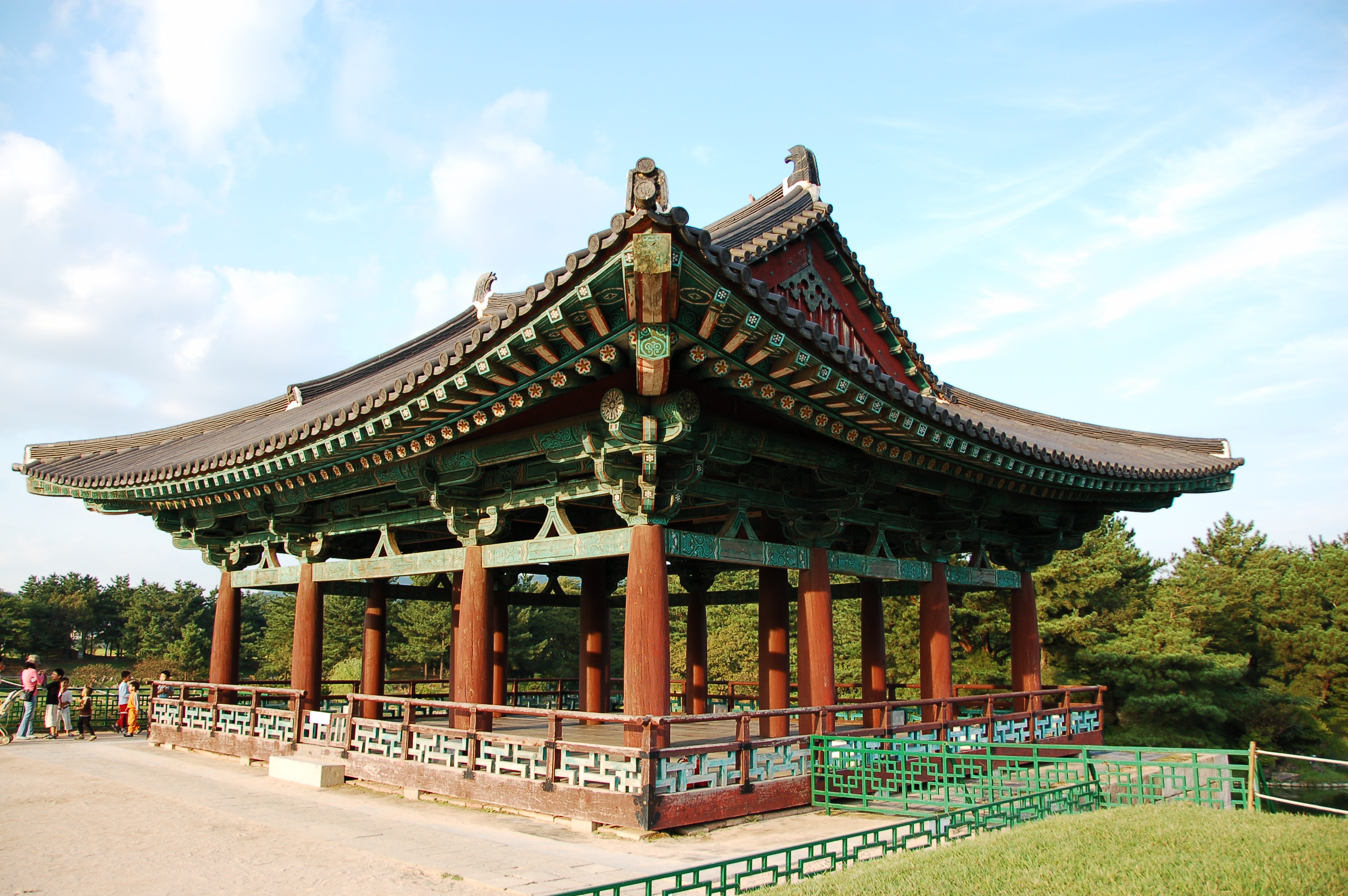
- A reconstructed pavilion at Anapji pond
- Interactive map of Gyeongju National Park
- Location: Gyeongju, North Gyeongsang Province, South Korea
- Coordinates: 35°52′03″N 129°13′21″E
- Area: 137.09 km^{2} (52.93 sq mi)
- Established: 31 December 1968
- Governing body: Korea National Park Service

Korean name
- Hangul: 경주국립공원
- Hanja: 慶州國立公園
- RR: Gyeongju gungnip gongwon
- MR: Kyŏngju kungnip kongwŏn

The twenty-two national parks of South Korea.
Land-based parks are in red and marine parks are in blue.

Gyeongju National Park (Korean: 경주국립공원) is a national park in Gyeongju, North Gyeongsang Province, South Korea. It is the country's only historical national park.

It was designated the country's national park on 31 December 1968. The park covers many of the principal Silla historical sites in Gyeongju City.

It is divided into eight non-contiguous sections: Gumisan and Danseoksan sections to the west of the city center; Hwarang, Seoak, Sogeumgang, and Namsan sections in the heart of Gyeongju; Tohamsan section to the east, and Daebon section on the coast of the Sea of Japan (East Sea).
