= K Pop Museum =

Museum in Gyeongju, South Korea

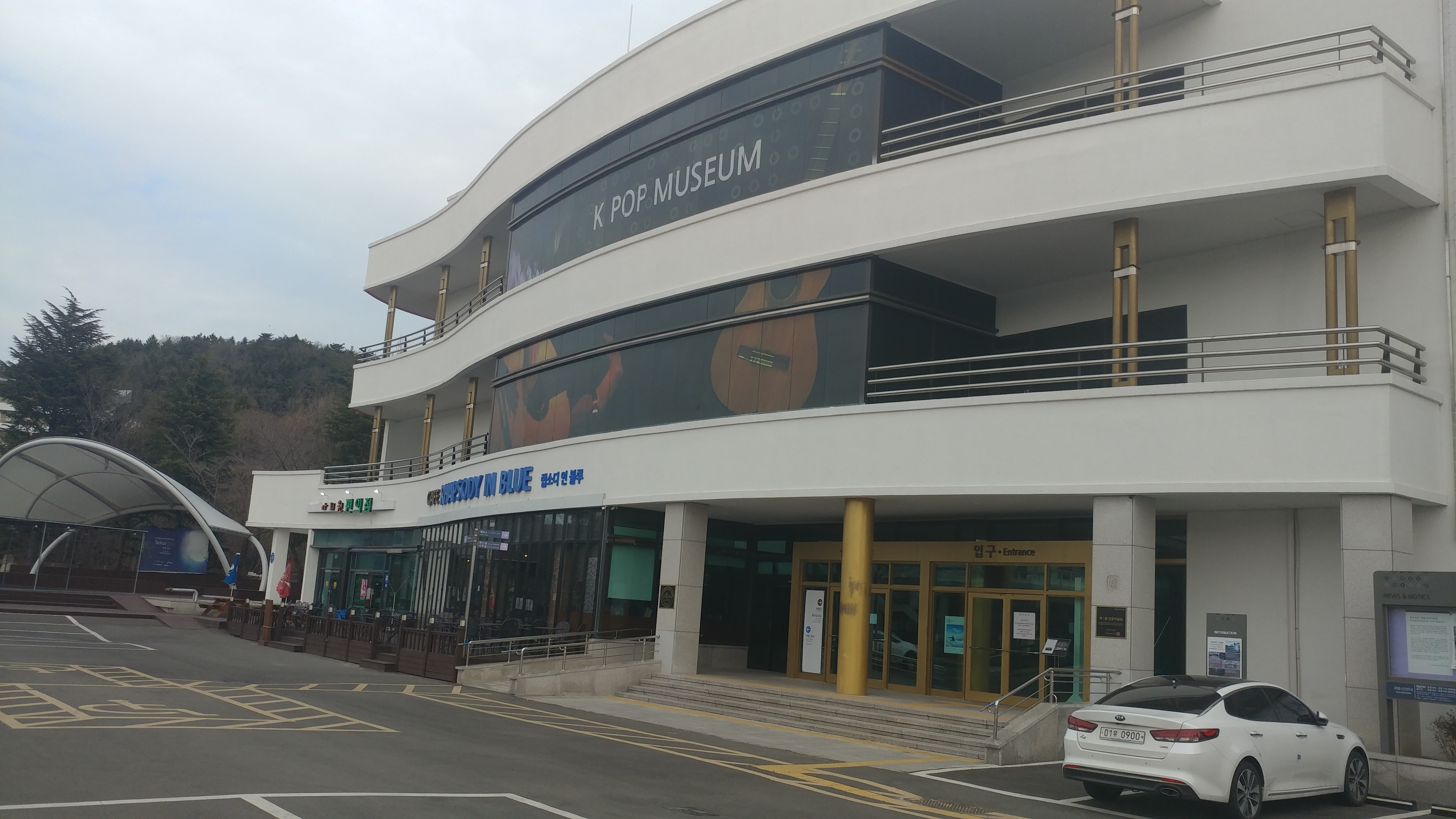
- Museum exterior (2017)
- Established: April 25, 2015
- Location: 9 Expo-ro, Gyeongju, North Gyeongsang Province, South Korea
- Coordinates: 35.839987°N 129.289136°E
- Type: K-pop museum
- Collection size: 70,000
- Director: Yoo Chung-Hee
- Nearest parking: On site
- Website: kpopmuseum.com/eng/ (in English)

Korean name
- Hangul: 한국대중음악박물관
- Hanja: 韓國大衆音樂博物館
- RR: Hanguk daejungeumak bangmulgwan
- MR: Han'guk taejungŭmak pangmulgwan

The K Pop Museum (Korean: 한국대중음악박물관) is a private Korean popular music (K-pop) museum in Bomun Lake Resort, Gyeongju, South Korea. It opened on April 25, 2015 and claims to be the first K-pop museum in Korea.

Its exhibits cover the history of modern Korean music from the early 1900s, during the Korean Empire period, until the present. It has a total floor space of 1,090 square meters (11,700 sq ft), and has three floors of exhibits, a floor for an auditorium and cafe, and a parking lot. It has a collection of 70,000 items and also has an outdoor stage.
