= Bomun Lake Resort =

Tourist complex in Gyeongju, South Korea

Coordinates: 35.8426°N 129.2841°E

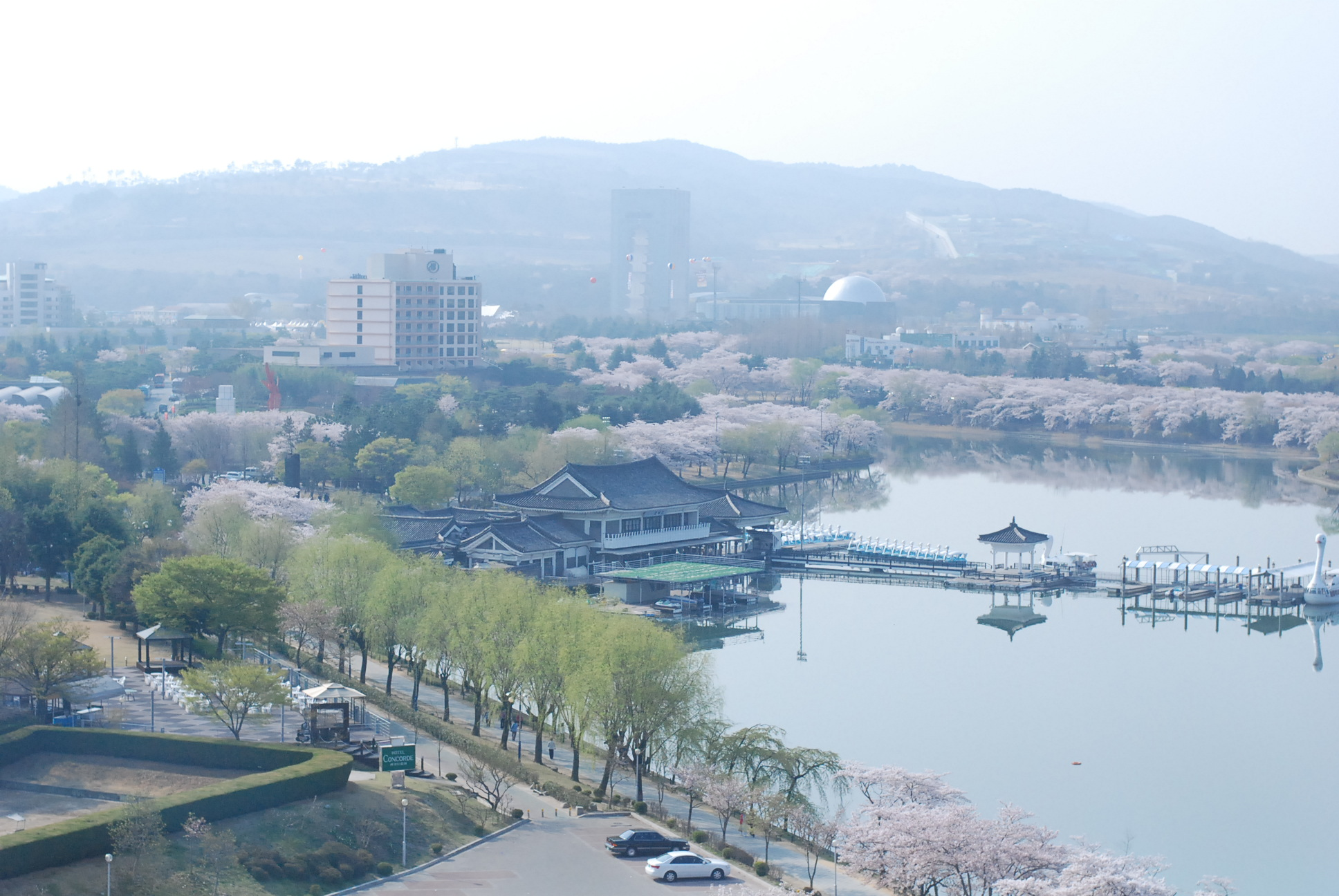

Korean name
- Hangul: 보문관광단지
- Hanja: 普門觀光團地
- RR: Bomun gwangwang danji
- MR: Pomun kwan'gwang tanji

The Bomun Lake Resort or Bomun Tourist Complex (Korean: 보문관광단지) is a large tourist complex around Bomun Lake in the city of Gyeongju, South Korea. The resort covers the districts of Bomun-dong, Sinpyeong-dong, Amgok-dong and Cheongun-dong. It is situated under the ruins of the former mountain fortress Myeonghwalseong, 6.5 km east of the central Gyeongju and faces Toham mountain. It provides lodging, eatery, recreation and sports facilities in the city. Although the resort was originally established to attract foreign visitors, as the domestic income and desire for tourism were increased since the late 1980s, it gained a tremendous popularity from domestic visitors. As a result, from onward, various facilities have been built for domestic visitors.

The K Pop Museum is located on the grounds.

== History ==
In August 1971, the government concluded the Gyeongju tourism development plan, started in 1974, opened the Bomun Gwangwang complex in 1975, and completed the entire 2.1 million pyeong tourism development project in January 1979.

== Gallery ==
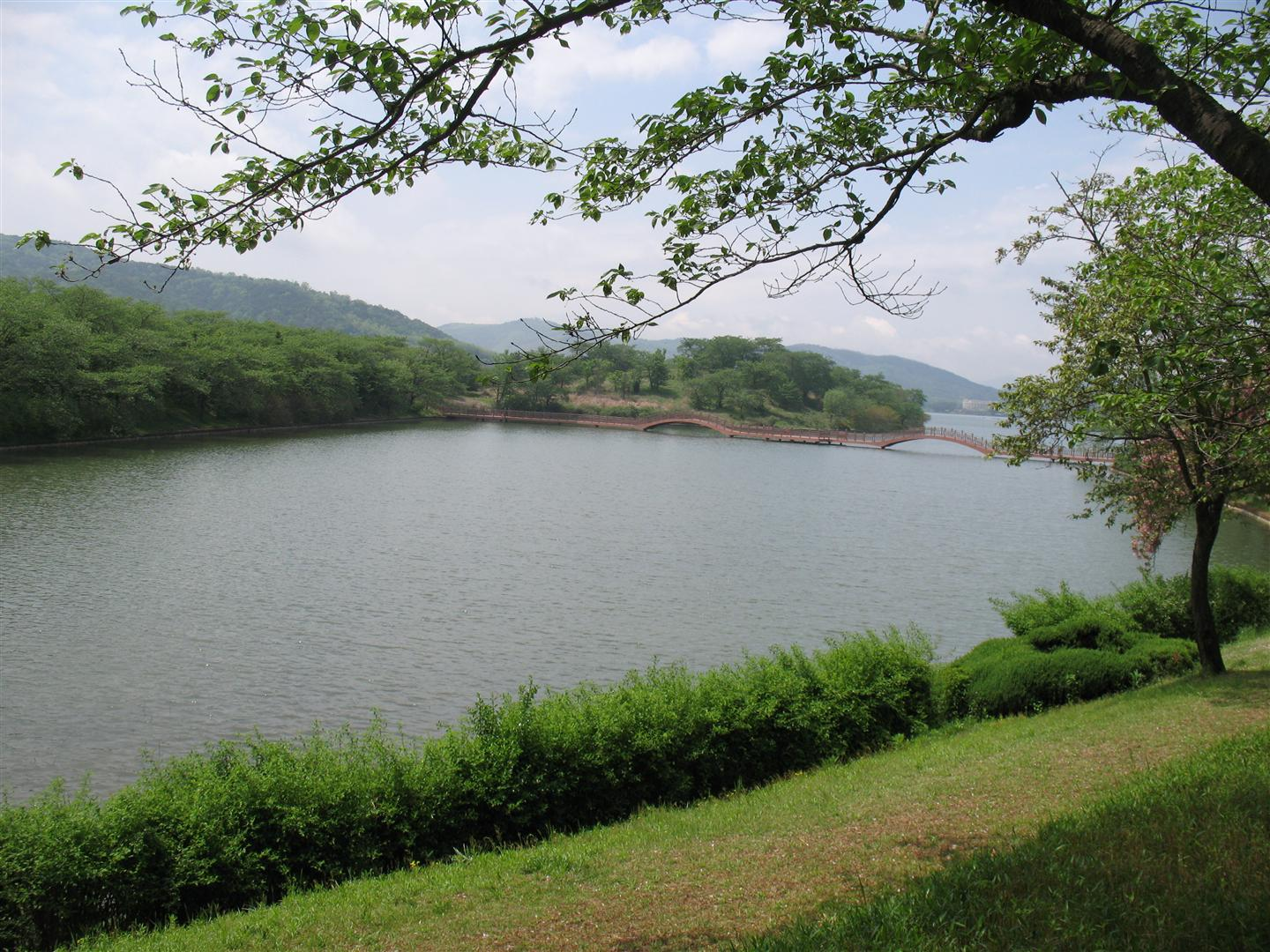

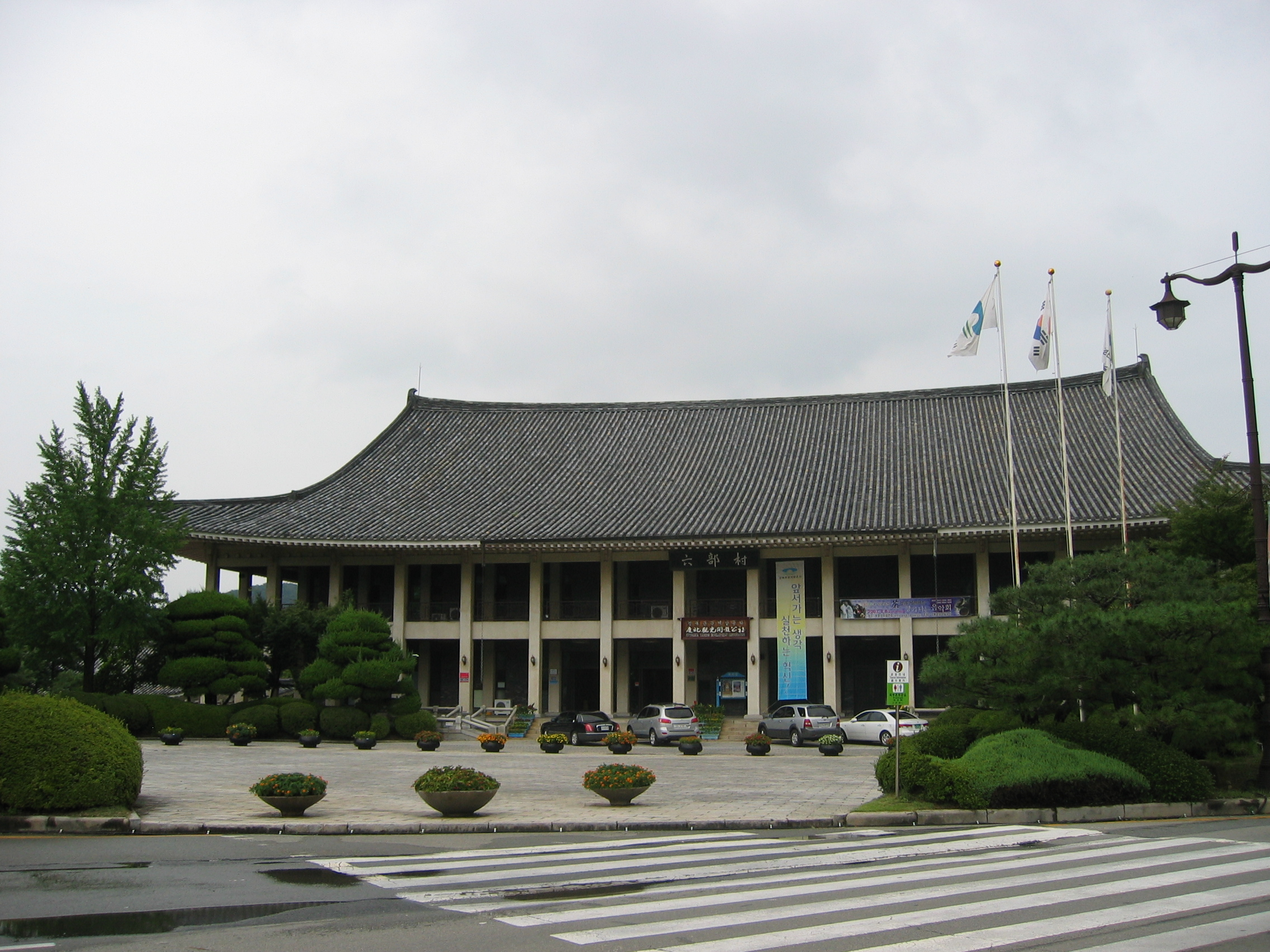

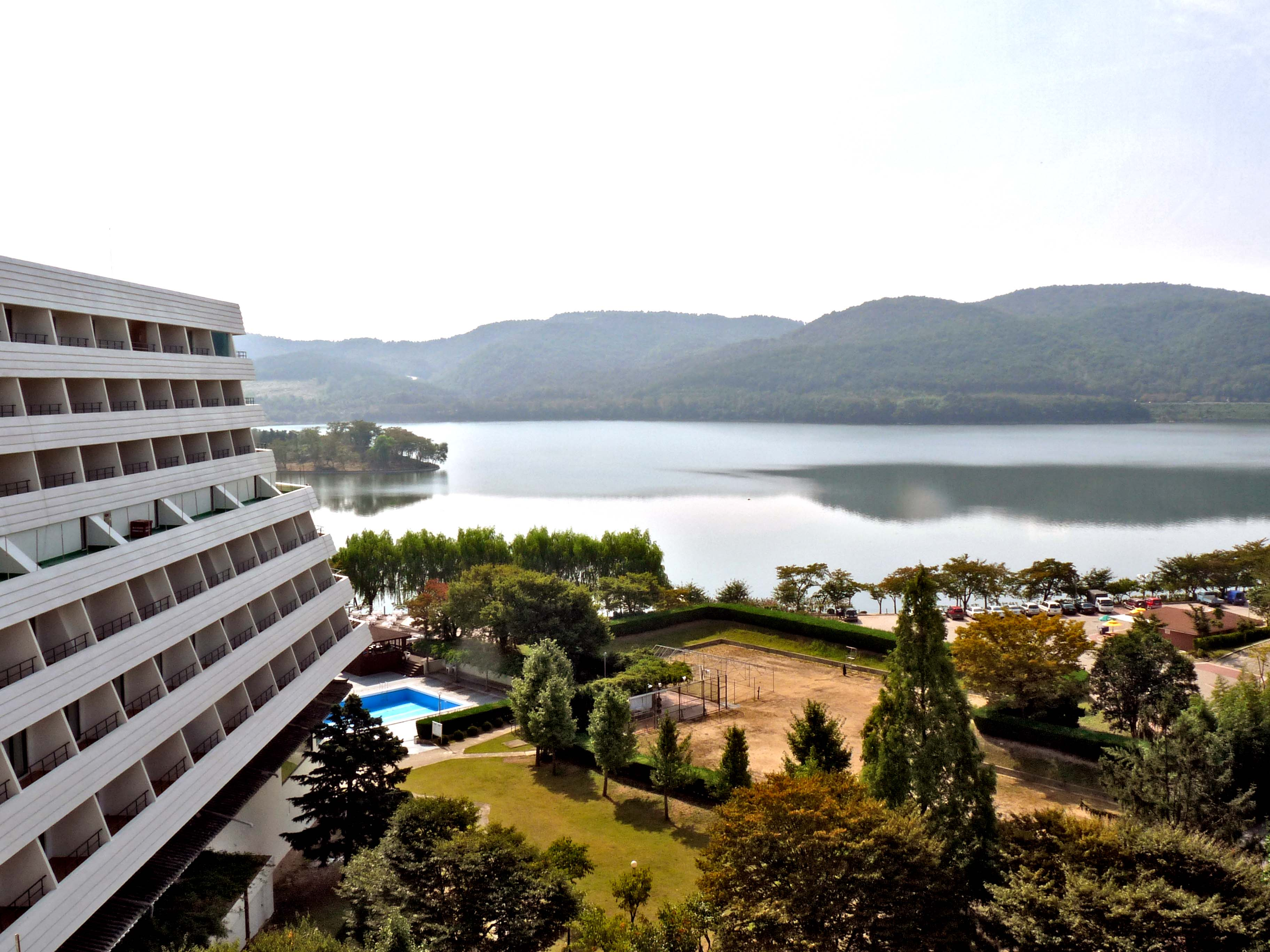

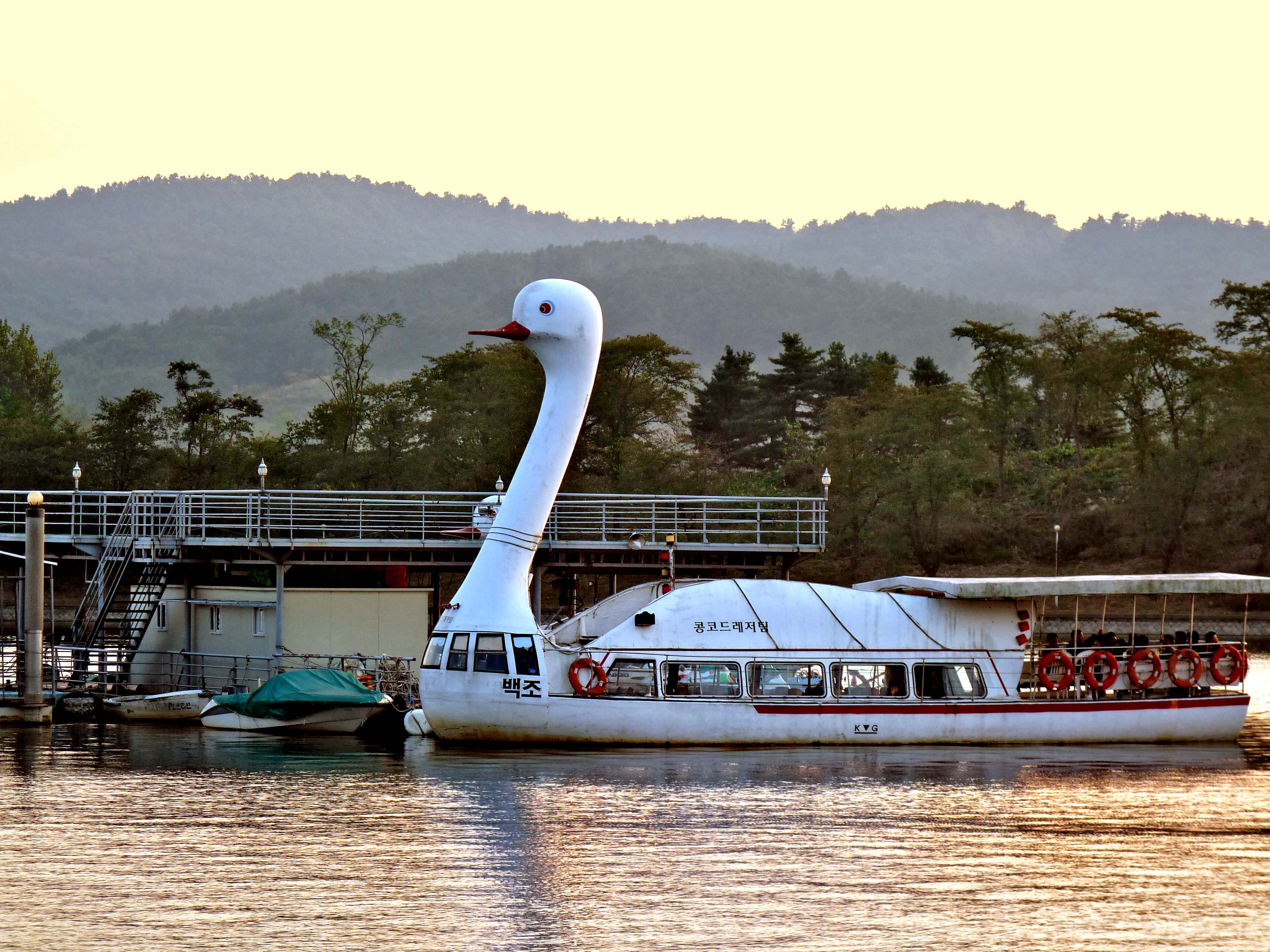

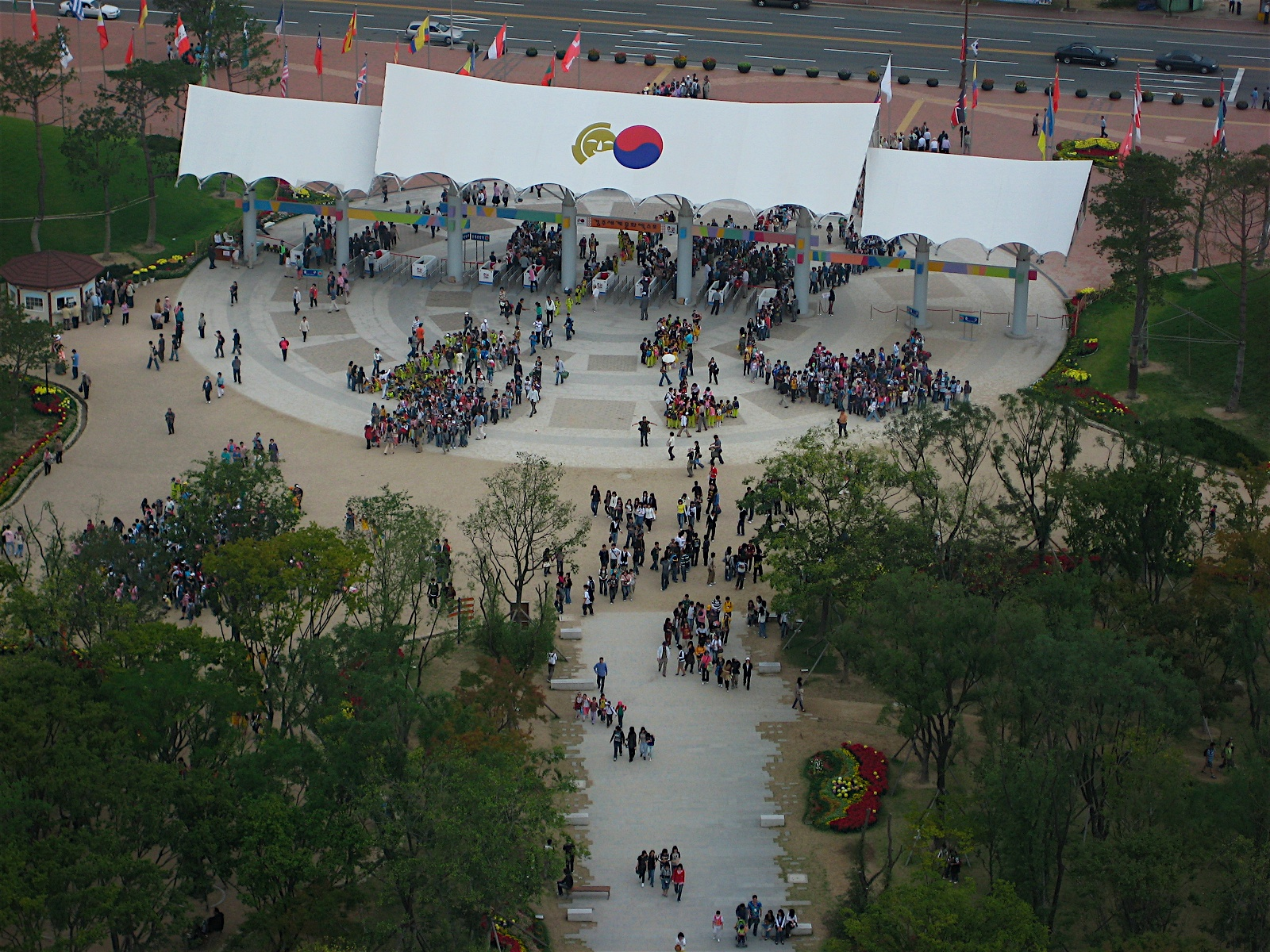

== See also ==
- Tourism in Gyeongju
