= List of islands of South Korea =

Landmasses surrounded by water in the country

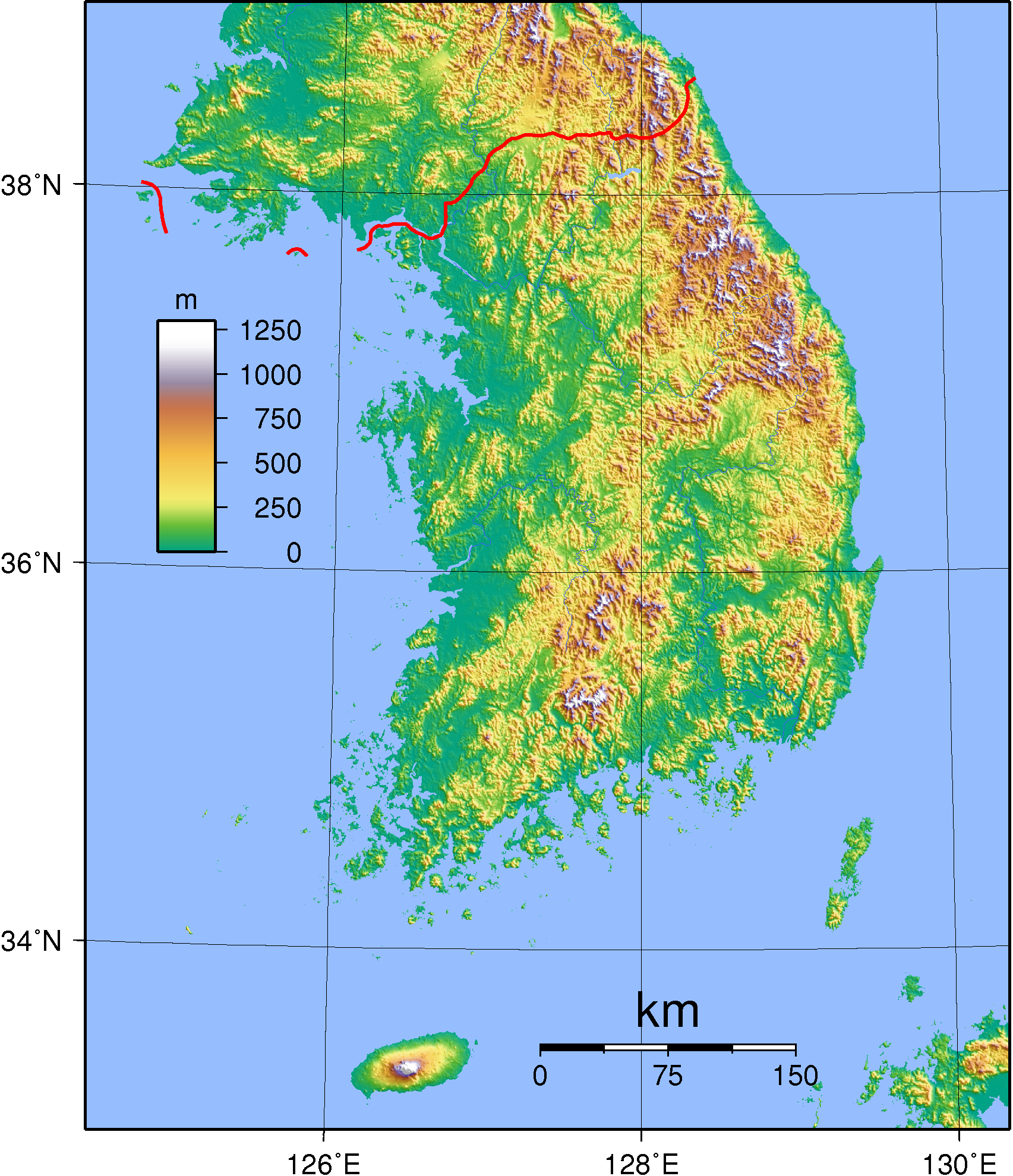
Map of South Korea

The following is a list of major islands of South Korea arranged by body of water and then by province.

South Korea is mostly surrounded by water and has 2,413 kilometres (1,499 mi) of coast line along three seas; to the west is the Yellow Sea (called Sohae Korean: 서해; Hanja: 西海; in South Korea, literally means west sea), to the south is the East China Sea, and to the east is the East Sea (Sea of Japan) (called Donghae Korean: 동해; Hanja: 東海; in South Korea, literally means east sea). Geographically, South Korea's landmass is approximately 100,032 square kilometres (38,623 mi^{2}).

South Korea occupies the southern portion of the Korean Peninsula, and has more islands than North Korea. Most of the islands of South Korea are on its west and south coasts. Jeonnam-Gwangju has the most islands among South Korea and Korean peninsula. Other well known islands of South Korea are Jeju Island, Dokdo, Geojedo, Marado, and Heuksando for tourism.

In accordance with the Constitution of South Korea, all of the islands controlled by the DPRK are wholly claimed by the ROK. Generally, name of islands of South Korea have do or seom at the end of the word. These notable two words mean island or islet in Korean language. For example, Jeju-do means Jeju Island and Hyeongjaeseom means Hyeongjae island.

== Incheon Metropolitan City ==
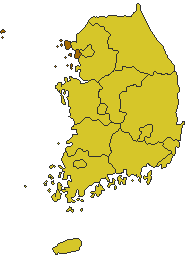
Map of Incheon

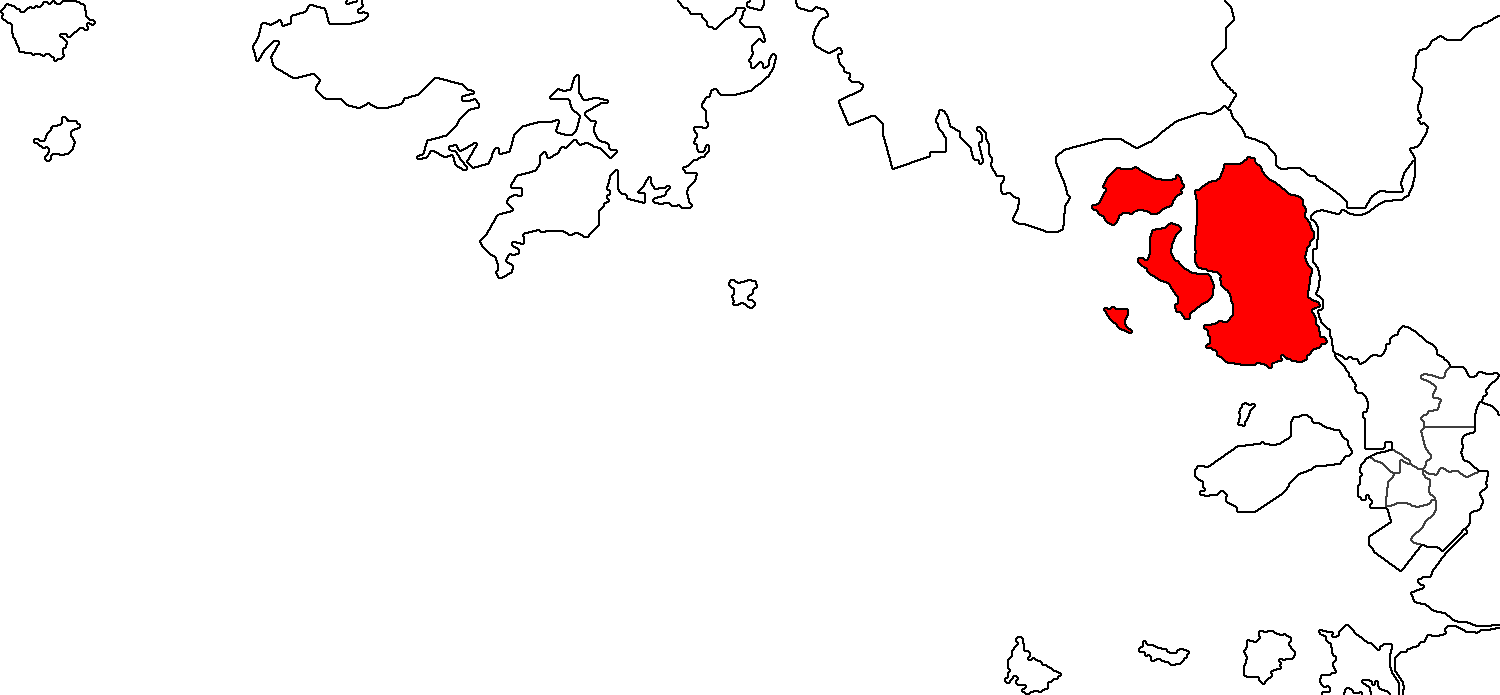
Map of Ganghwa

=== Ganghwa county ===
- Boreumdo
  - Achado
  - Bido
  - Maldo
  - Suribong
  - Yongrando
- Donggeomdo
- Ganghwado
  - Eoyujeongdo
  - Gogado
  - Maeumdo
  - Songgado
- Gyodongdo
- Jumundo
  - Bunjido
  - Seokdo
  - Suseom
  - Susido
- Seogeomdo
  - Goiriseom
  - Mibeopdo
  - Nabdo
- Seongmodo
  - Ddannapseom
  - Daeseom
  - Daesongdo
  - Dolseom
  - Gijangseom
  - Sosongdo
- Woodo

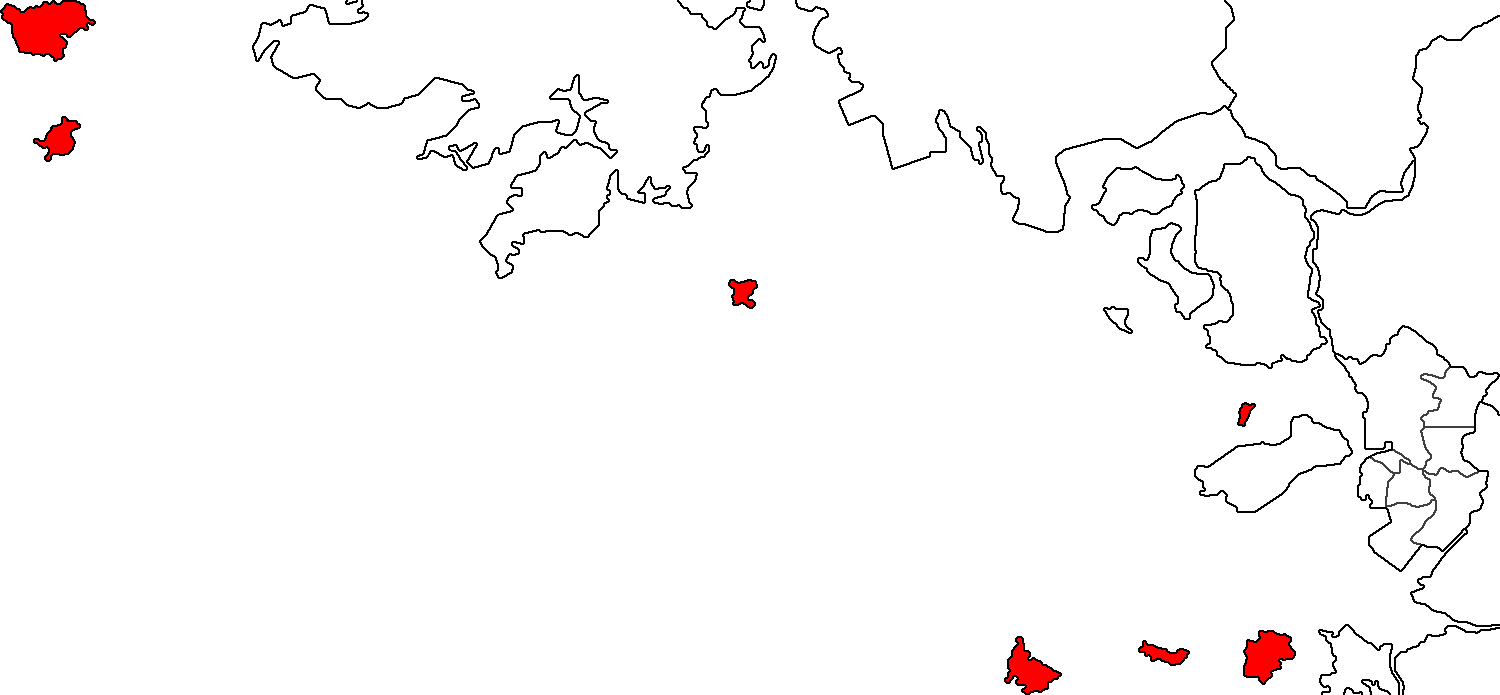
Map of Ongjin

=== Ongjin county ===
- Baegado
  - Beolseom
  - Budo
  - Doryangdo
  - Gyeseom
  - Gwando
  - Gwangdaedo
  - Jido
  - Meongaeseom
  - Nabdo
  - Oseom
  - Uldo
- Baengnyeongdo
- Daecheongdo
- Daechojido
- Daeijakdo
- Deokjeokdo
  - Meokdo
- Dongbaekdo
- Eopyungdo
- Gabjukdo
- Gado
- Gakheuldo
  - Anggakheuldo
  - Tonggakheuldo
  - Jungtonggakheuldo
  - Sotonggakheuldo
- Gureopdo
- Hangdo
- Jangbongdo
  - Amseodo
  - Bigajido
  - Dongmando
  - Sado
  - Seomando
  - Seonmido
  - Wado
- Jawoldo
- Modo
- Mungapdo
- Mungtungdo
- Odo
- Saseungbongdo
- Seongapdo
- Seonjaedo
  - Cheukdo
  - Oihangdo
- Seungbongdo
  - Gumdo
  - Budo
  - Sanggonggyungdo
- Sido
- Sindo
- Socheongdo
- Sochojido
- Sogado
- Soijakdo
- Yeongheungdo
- Yeonpyeongdo
  - Daeyeonpyeongdo
  - Soyeonpyeongdo
  - Chaekdo
  - Moido
  - Kujido
  - Geodo
  - Soyado

=== Other ===
- Jakyakdo
- Muuido
- Palmido
- Silmido
- Se-eodo
- Songdo (Artificial island)
- Yongyudo, Yeongjongdo—now joined together by Incheon International Airport

== Gyeonggi Province ==
Map of Gyeonggi province

=== Ansan city ===
- Bultando
- Daebudo
- Pungdo
- Seongamdo
- Yukdo

=== Hwaseong city ===
- Eodo
- Gukhwado
- Hyungdo
- Jebudo
- Ueumdo

== Gangwon Province ==
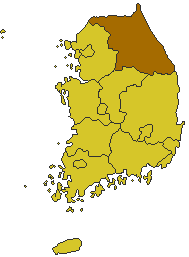
Map of Gangwon province

=== Within Chuncheon city ===
- Namiseom
- Bungeosom
- Jungdo

=== Within Hwacheon county ===
- Bungeosom

== South Chungcheong Province ==
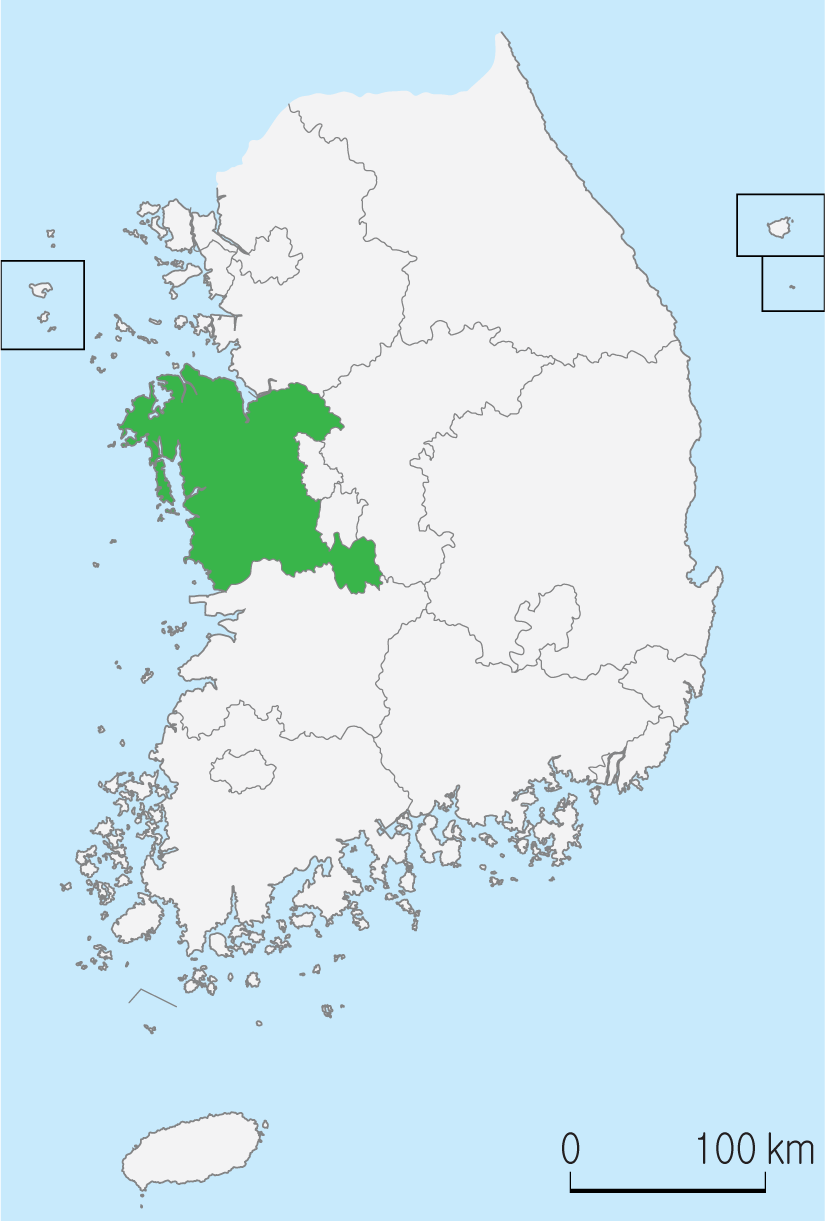
Map of South chungcheong province

=== Dangjin ===
- Daejodo
- Haengdando
- Nanjido

=== Seosan ===
- Bunjeomdo
- Ganwoldo
- Gopado
- Jeodo
- Ungdo
- Woodo
- docdo

=== Taean ===
- Ando
- Anmyeondo
- Dujido
- Gauido
- Gyeokryeolbi Islands
  - Bukgyeokryeolbido
  - Donggyeokryeolbido
  - Seogyeokryeolbido
- Hwangdo
- Jukdo
- Mado
- Napasudo
- Oedo
- Oepasudo
- Ongdo
- Sinjindo

=== Hongseong ===
- Jukdo

=== Boryeong ===
- Bingdo
- Chudo
- Godaedo
- Heoyukdo
- Hodo
- Hyojado
- Janggodo
- Jukdo
- Nokdo
- Oeyeongdo
- Sapsido
- Sodo
- Songdo
- Wonsando
- Woldo
- Yukdo

=== Seocheo ===
- Yubudo

== North Jeolla Province ==
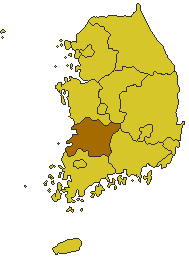
Map of North Jeolla province

=== Gochang County ===
- Daejukdo
- Sojukdo
- Ssangyeodo
- Jukdo

=== Gunsan city ===
- Gaeyado
- Gogunsan archipelago
- Geumrando
- Seonyudo
- Seokdo
- Sipyeedongpado
- Eocheongdo
- Yeondo
- Jukdo
- Guido

=== Buan county ===
- Naejodo
- Dalludo
- Daehyeongjaedo
- Ddanjeonggeumdo
- Sangwangdeungdo
- Saehangdo
- Sikdo
- Waejodo
- Waechido
- Wido
- Hawangdeungdo

=== Imsil county ===
- Bungeoseom

=== Jeongeup county ===
- Hwangtoseom

== Jeonnam-Gwangju ==
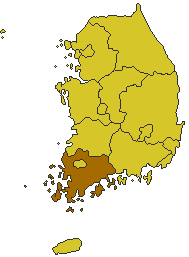
Map of South Jeolla province

=== Goheung county ===
- Aedo
- Araetdonbae-seom
- Daehangdo
- Deukryangdo
- Geogeumdo
- Gokdudo
- Jinjiwaedo
- Jukdo
- Mokdo
- Narodo
  - Naenarodo
  - Oenarodo
- Naewaemuldo
- Nohwado
- Sorokdo
- and many other islets

=== Gwangyang city ===
- Baealdo

=== Jindo county ===
- Byeongpungdo
- Jindo
- Maenggolgundo
- Modo
- and many other islets

=== Muan county ===
- Samhakdo
- Banwoldo
- Anjwado

=== Sinan county ===
- Aphaedo
- Anjwado
- Amtaedo
- Biguemdo
- Dochodo
- Gageodo
- Hauido
- Heuksando
- Hongdo
- Hwa-do
- Imjado
- Jaeundo
- Jjdo
- Sinuido
- Uido
- and many other islets

=== Wando county ===
- Bogildo
- Cheongsando
- Gadeokdo
- Gogeumdo
- Joyakdo
- Judo
- Saengildo
- Sinjido
- Wan-do
- Yeoseo-do
- Sinjido

=== Yeonggwang county ===
- Anma-do
- Choramdo

=== Yeosu city ===
- Dolsando
- Gadeokdo
- Geumodo
- Jangdo
- Janggundo
- Odongdo
- Port Hamilton (Geomundo)
  - Sodo (Seodo)
  - Sunhodo (Dongdo)
- Sangtedo

=== Others ===
- Gageo Reef (Gageocho)
- Parangcho
- Socotra Rock (Leodo)

== Jeju Province ==
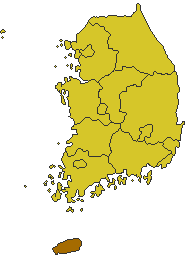
Map of Jeju

=== Jeju city ===
- Biyangdo
- Chagwido
- Chuja Gundo (Chuja archipelago)
- Gapado
- Gwantaldo

=== Seogwipo city ===
- Beomseom
- Supseom
- Marado
- Udo
- Hyeongjeseom

== South Gyeongsang Province ==
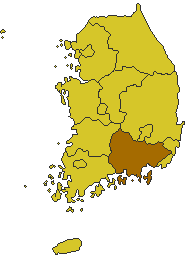
Map of South Gyeongsang province

=== Within Hadong-gun ===
- Mado
- Daedo
- Jangdo
- Jujiseom

=== Within Namhae-gun ===
- Namhaedo
- Changseondo
- Jodo
- Hodo
- Nodo
- Sochido
- Maando

=== Within Sacheon-si ===
- Woldeungdo
- Sinsudo

=== Within Goseong-gun ===
- Anjangseom
- Jarando
- Wado
- Witdaehoseom
- Patseom

=== Within Tongyeong ===
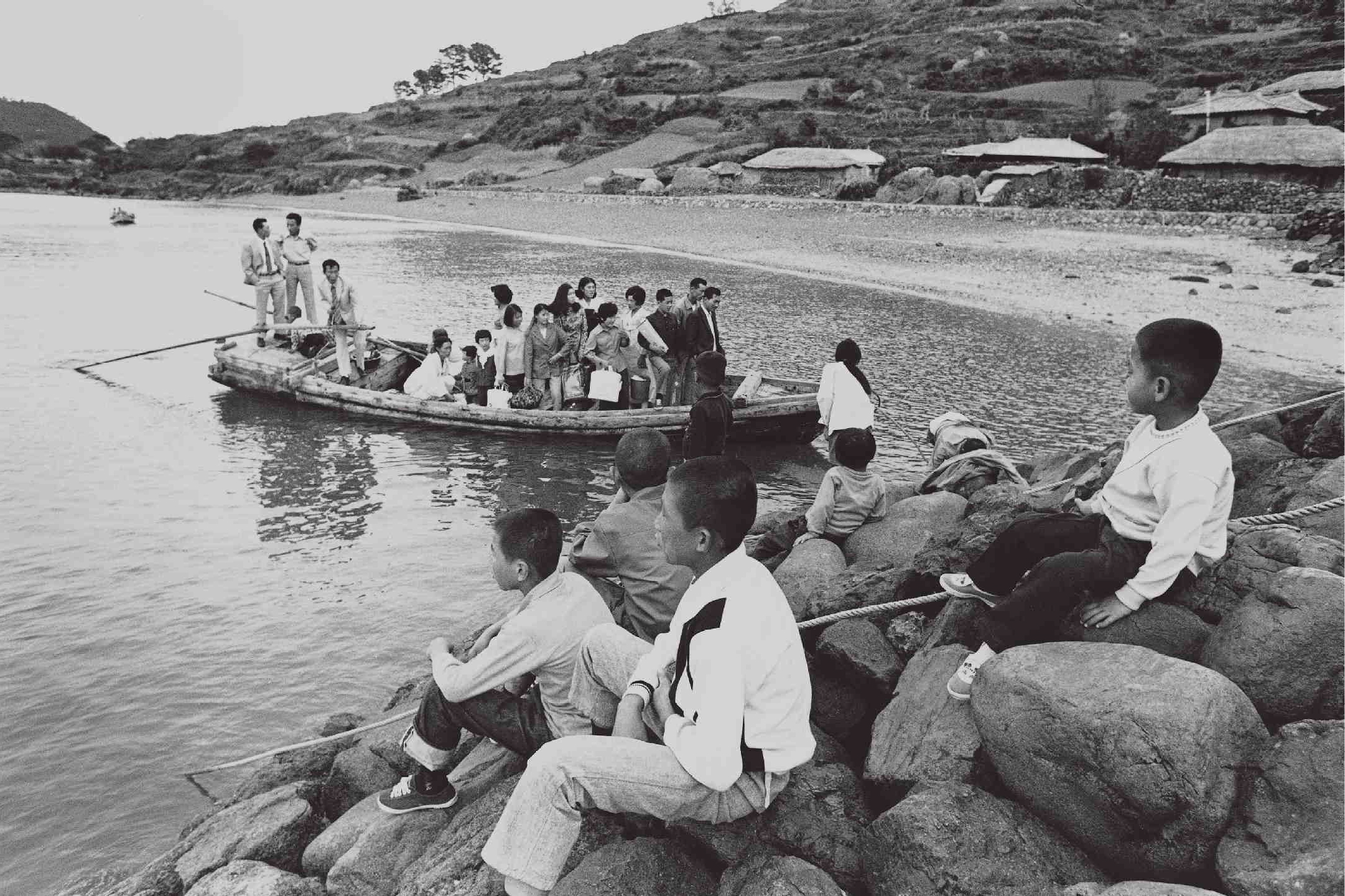
Ogokdo in 1981

- Suudo
- Saryangdo
- Araetseom
- Dumido
- Hanodaedo
- Yokjido
- Chudo
- Bongdo
- Udo
- Yeonhwado
- Jwasarido
- Sojanggundo
- Mireukdo
- Yeondaedo
- Naebujido
- Oebujido
- Hakrimdo
- Ogokdo
- Gukdo
- Jido
- Hwado
- Jukdo
- Hansando
- Bijindo
- Sojido
- Bisando
- Eoeuido
- Sudo
- Jwado
- Yongchodo
- Songdo
- Chubongdo
- Jukdo
- Jangsado
- Daedeokdo
- Gawangdo
- Maemuldo
- Somaemuldo

== Busan Metropolitan city ==
=== Yeongdo district ===
- Yeongdo
- Jodo

== North Gyeongsang Province ==
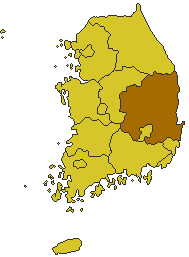
Map of North Gyeongsang province

=== Within Sangju ===
- Gyeongcheonseom

=== Within Andong ===
- Budleseom

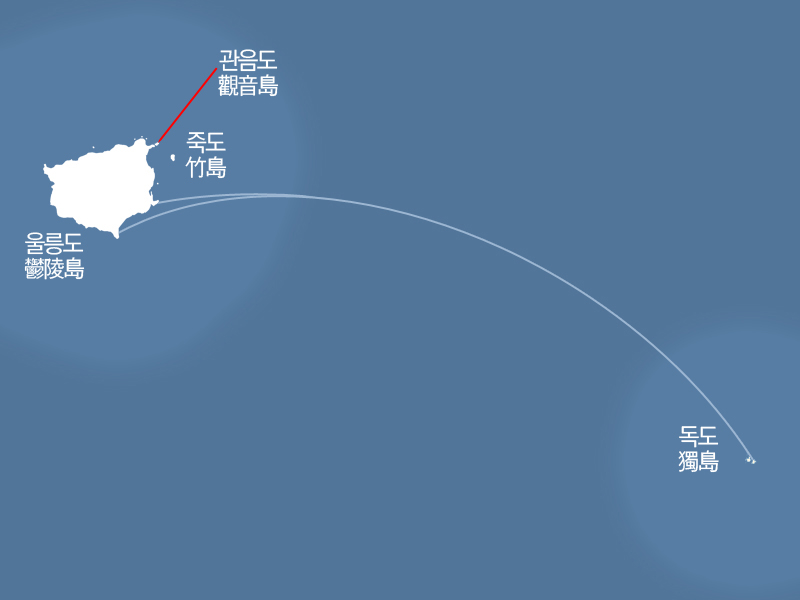
Map of Ulleung island

=== Ulleung County ===
- Ulleungdo
- Jukdo
- Kwanundo
- Dokdo (Dongdo, Seodo)

=== Pohang city ===
- Samjeongseom
- Jakdo
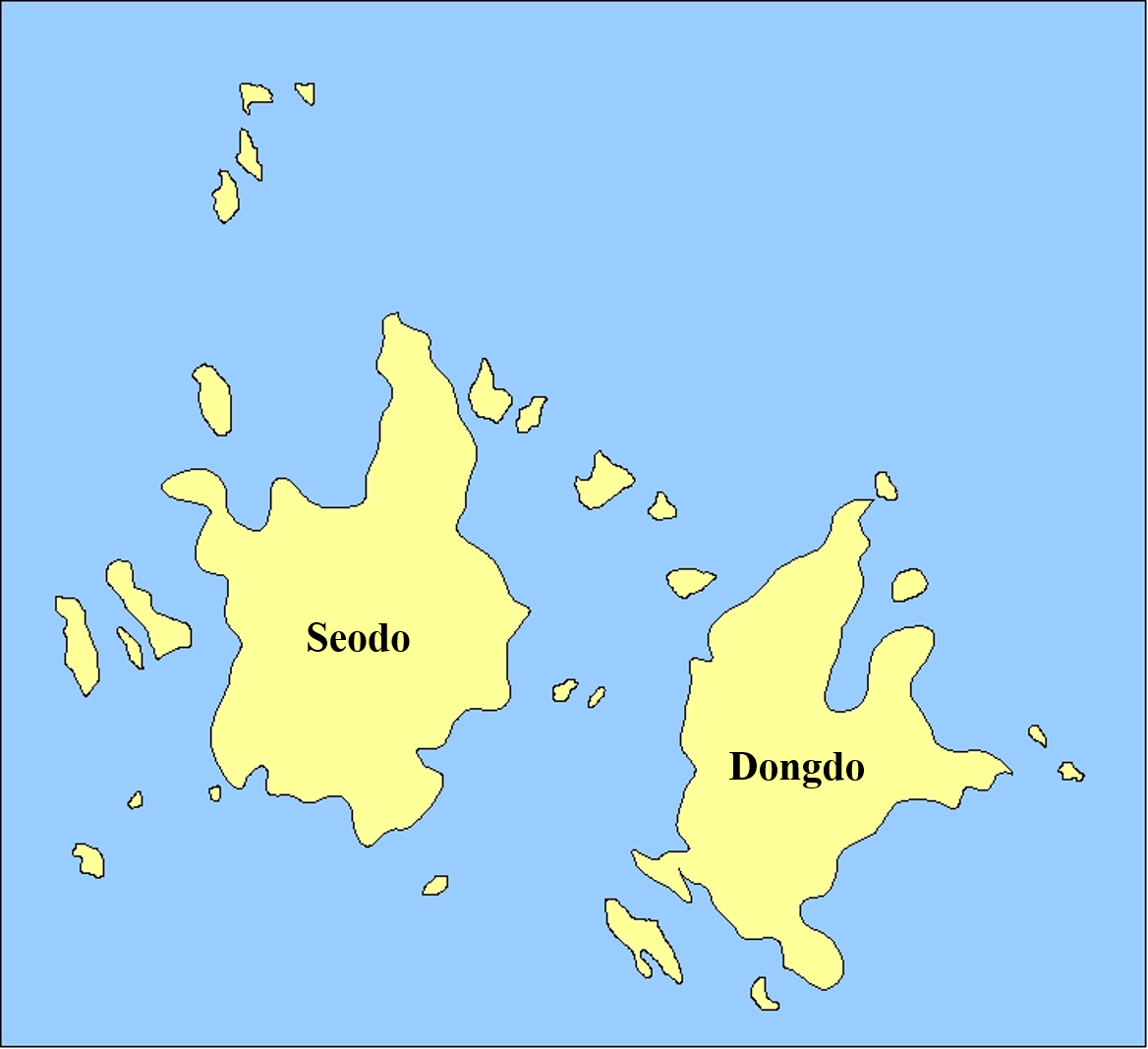
  Map of Dokdo

== Seoul Metropolitan city ==
=== Within Han river ===
- Bamseom
- Nodeulseom
- Sebitseom
- Seonyudo
- Yeouido

== Number of islands by administrative divisions ==
Provincial-level division	Extension of shore		Islands									Islands with people	
Provincial-level division	Extension of shore		Total			Islands with people			Islands without people			Houses	Population
Provincial-level division	Area (km^{2})	Area (sq mi)	Number	Area (km^{2})	Area (sq mi)	Number	Area (km^{2})	Area (sq mi)	Number	Area (km^{2})	Area (sq mi)J	Houses	Population
Incheon	880.30	339.89	154	687.02	265.26	42	680.91	262.90	112	6.11	2.36	33,046	94,172
Gyeonggi Province	303.57	117.21	65	44.57	17.21	11	43.74	16.89	54	0.83	0.32	2,768	7,215
South Chungcheong Province	1,204.60	465.10	261	163.01	62.94	37	150.48	58.10	224	12.54	4.84	6,867	20,26
North Jeolla Province	301.70	116.49	109	37.95	14.65	26	35.31	13.63	83	2.64	1.02	1,985	6,468
South Jeolla Province	5,554.90	2,144.76	2210	1,836.49	709.07	278	1,790.55	691.34	1,688	45.92	17.73	78,071	219,542
South Gyeongsang Province	2,173.64	839.25	428	930.05	359.09	82	918.21	354.52	346	11.84	4.57	99,673	313,551
Busan	313.92	121.21	82	75.80	29.27	6	69.16	26.70	76	6.64	2.56	119,402	384,366
Ulsan	135.83	52.44	8	0.09	0.035	–	–	–	8	0.09	0.035	–	–
North Gyeongsang Province	428.00	165.25	47	73.73	28.47	4	73.60	28.42	43	0.13	0.050	3,840	10,426
Gangwon Province	318.10	122.82	32	0.26	0.10	–	–	–	32	0.26	0.10	–	–
Jeju Province	419.95	162.14	63	15.45	5.97	8	13.80	5.33	55	1.65	0.64	2,232	5,98
Total	12,035	4,647	3,459	3,824	1,476	494	3,736	1,442	2,721	89	34	347,884	1,061,984

== List of islands by area ==
#	Name	Korean Name	Hanja Name	Location	Area	
#	Name	Korean Name	Hanja Name	Location	km^{2}	sq mi
1	Jejudo	제주도	濟州島	Jeju Province	1,833.162	707.788
2	Geojedo	거제도	巨濟島	Geoje	379.233	146.423
3	Jindo	진도	珍島	Jindo County	374.981	144.781
4	Ganghwado	강화도	江華島	Ganghwa County	302.582	116.828
5	Namhaedo	남해도	南海島	Namhae County	300.935	116.192
6	Anmyeondo	안면도	安眠島	Taean County	113.460	43.807
7	Yeongjongdo	영종도	永宗島	Jung District, Incheon	97.480	37.637
8	Wando	완도	莞島	Wando County	90.074	34.778
9	Ulleungdo	울릉도	鬱陵島	Ulleung County	72.861	28.132
10	Dolsando	돌산도	突山島	Yeosu	70.307	27.146
11	Geogeumdo	거금도	居金島	Goheung County	64.765	25.006
12	Jido	지도	智島	Sinan County	54.703	21.121
13	Changseondo	창선도	昌善島	Namhae County	54.127	20.899
14	Jaeundo	자은도	慈恩島	Sinan County	52.193	20.152
15	Baengnyeongdo	백령도	白翎島	Ongjin County	51.086	19.724
16	Aphaedo	압해도	押海島	Sinan County	49.232	19.009
17	Anjwado	안좌도	安佐島	Sinan County	48.923	18.889
18	Gyodongdo	교동도	喬棟島	Ganghwa County	47.141	18.201
19	Biguemdo	비금도	飛禽島	Sinan County	46.249	17.857
20	Gogeumdo	고금도	古今島	Wando County	45.558	17.590
21	Dochodo	도초도	都草島	Sinan County	43.398	16.756
22	Seokmodo	석모도	席毛島	Ganghwa County	42.344	16.349
23	Imjado	임자도	荏子島	Sinan County	40.049	15.463
24	Amtaedo	암태도	巖泰島	Sinan County	37.251	14.383
25	Cheongsando	청산도	靑山島	Wando County	32.963	12.727
26	Bogildo	보길도	甫吉島	Wando County	32.142	12.410
27	Sinuido	신의도	新衣島	Sinan County	31.668	12.227
28	Sinjido	신지도	新智島	Wando County	30.832	11.904
29	Joyakdo	조약도	助藥島	Wando County	28.701	11.082
30	Geumodo	금오도	金鰲島	Yeosu	27.508	10.621

== See also ==
- List of islands
- Geography of Korea
- Geography of North Korea
- Geography of South Korea
- List of islands of North Korea
