= Amtaedo =

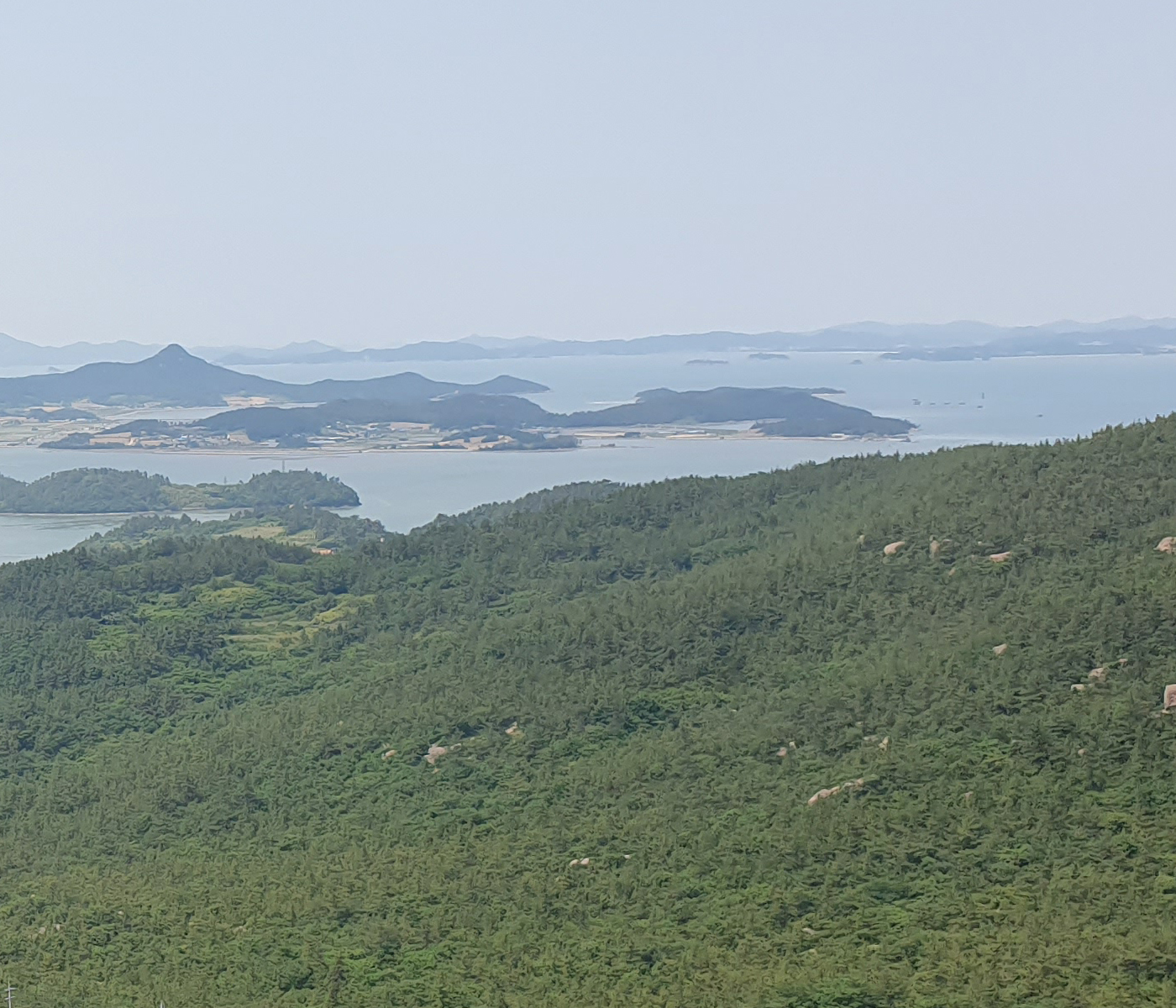
- Interactive map of Amtaedo
- Coordinates: 34°50′10″N 126°05′50″E
- Country: South Korea
- Province: South Jeolla
- County: Sinan County

Area
  - Total: 37 km^{2} (14 sq mi)

Population (2001)
  - Total: 2,956
  - Density: 80/km^{2} (210/sq mi)

Korean name
- Hangul: 암태도
- Hanja: 巖泰島
- RR: Amtaedo
- MR: Amt'aedo

Amtaedo (Korean: 암태도) is the sixth largest island in Sinan County, South Jeolla Province, South Korea. The island lies in the Yellow Sea about 25 km west of Mokpo, South Jeolla Province, South Korea. The highest peak on Amtaedo is Seungbongsan (승봉산), which stands at 355 meters above sea level.

In the past it was only possible travel to Amtaedo by a ferry departing from the Mokpo Coast Ferry Terminal. However, on April 4, 2019 the Angel Bridge (천사대교) was completed connecting Amtaedo with the island of Aphaedo (압해도). Since Aphaedo is connected to the mainland by two bridges, it is now possible to drive to Amtaedo by car. The neighboring islands of Jaeundo (자은도), Palgeumdo (팔금도) and Chupodo (추포도) are connected to Amtaedo by bridges.

== Description ==
The economy of Amtaedo is heavily dependent upon agriculture and fishing. The chief agricultural products of the island include rice, sesame seeds, beans, sweet potatoes and chili peppers. In terms of fishing, the main products include croakers, masu salmon, dotted gizzard shad, anchovies, hairtail and octopus. Although Amtaedo produces a variety of foodstuffs, it is most famous for the quality of its barley and garlic.

=== Amtaedo Lighthouse ===
Amtaedo Lighthouse is a small brick lighthouse built in 1913 on the north-eastern coast of Amtaedo. The lighthouse is painted white and emits two white flashes every five seconds. Due to the fact that the lighthouse is placed on a hill, the light source stands at approximately 38 meters (125 feet) above the water's surface. Since Palmido Lighthouse, the first western style lighthouse in Korea, was built off the coast of Incheon in 1903, Amtaedo Lighthouse is one of the oldest lighthouses in South Korea. While the site of the lighthouse is open to visitors, the tower itself is closed to the general public.

=== Noman Temple ===
Noman temple (노만사) was built in 1873 on the southern foot of Keunbong mountain. Although it is relatively small, this temple is notable for being the oldest Buddhist temple in Shinan County. When it was founded in 1873, Noman temple consisted of a singled building with a thatched roof. However, the temple underwent an expansion in 1944 that brought the number of building up to seven. Nomansa is also famous for a small fresh water well formed by water drops falling from gaps in the mountain rocks. It is claimed that the well has never dried up despite the fact that there have been a number of droughts since the construction of the temple. The water from this well is believed to have medicinal properties and to be an effective cure for gastrointestinal problems.

== History ==
From August 1923 to August 1924 there was a dispute on Amtaedo between land owners and their tenants over the high rent on farm land. Many of the tenants protested against these high rents by refusing to pay them. After some of the protesters were arrested, more than 400 Amtaedo residents traveled to Mokpo by boat and staged demonstrations in front of the police station and the courthouse. Eventually, the Japanese colonial government intervened and reached an agreement to reduce rents and release the protestors from jail. This triggered a number of tenancy protests on other island on the west coast of Korea. To commemorate this event, the Amtaedo Tenant's Protest Monument was constructed on Amtaedo in 1998.

== In literature ==
Amtaedo (암태도) is a novel by the Korean writer Song Gisuk. It was first published as a twelve chapter novel by Changbi Publishers on November 30, 1981. This novel was written about the struggles faced by a group of tenant farmers on Amtaedo and was based on the events that took place during the Amtaedo Tenant's Protest (1923 - 1924).

== See also ==
- Islands of South Korea
