= Uido =

Island in South Jeolla Province, South Korea

- Interactive map of Uido

Geography
- Location: Uido-ri, Docho-myeon, Sinan County, South Jeolla Province, South Korea
- Coordinates: 34.611°N 125.842°E

Korean name
- Hangul: 우이도
- Hanja: 牛耳島
- Lit.: Cow ear island
- RR: Uido
- MR: Uido

Uido (Korean: 우이도) is an island located in Uido-ri, Docho-myeon, Sinan County, South Jeolla Province, South Korea. It has an area of 10.7 km^{2} (4.1 mi^{2}) and a coastline of 21 km (13 mi). It one of the 27 islands in the Ui Archipelago, with Dochodo to its northeast, Heuksando to its west, and Hauido to its east. The island is reportedly accessible via regular ferries from Mokpo on the mainland.

The island possibly received its name from its appearance, where two peninsulas on its western side are said to resemble the ears of a cow. The island has also gone by the names Soguseom (소구섬) or Ugaedo (우개도).

In 2009, it had a population of 162 people, with 86 men and 76 women. The island has historically been populated by members of the Papyeong Yun clan.
