= Wando Seaweeds Expo =

Exposition in South Korea

Wando Seaweeds Expo is the world's first international exposition themed to seaweeds, which, starting in 2014, has been held in Wan-do (‘island’), Republic of Korea every three years with the topic of seaweeds such as nori, sea mustard, kelp, and hijiki.

== Mascots and symbol ==
=== Mascots ===
The mascots, Haecho and Micho take their motives from the seaweeds that grow on elvan scattered in the sea off Wando.

=== Symbol ===
With the motives of seaweeds and sea, it succinctly expresses the earth that has seaweeds grow in clean water. The red color represents the development of red algae and seaweeds industry and the green color symbolizes green algae and clean natural environment, while the brown color stands for brown algae. Representing future on-farm resources and depicting the smoldering seaweeds, the shape symbolizes the unity of humankind and the wish to serve as a festive event for the whole humankind.

== Past Seaweeds EXPO ==
=== year 2014 ===
- Event Name : Wando Seaweeds Expo 2014
- period : 2014. 4. 11 ~ 2014. 5. 11 (31 days)
- Theme: Discovery of future life, Seaweeds
- Event Halls : Main Theme Hall(Energy), Health Food Hall(Food), Industrial Resources Hall(Industrial), Ecology Environment Hall(Live), Aquatic Culture Hall(Culture)
- Host & Organizer : Wando County, Jeolla-namdo, Wando Seaweeds Expo Committee
- Sponsors : Ministry of Oceans and Fisheries, Ministry of Culture, Sports and Tourism, and the Algae Society of Korea

=== year 2017 ===
- Event Name : Wando Seaweeds Expo 2017
- period : 2017. 4. 14 ~ 2014. 5. 7 (24 days)
- Theme: Promise of Seaweeds, Challenge the Future!
- Event Halls : Hall of Understanding Seaweeds, Hall of Earth Environment, Hall of Mystical Sea, Hall of Health and Humanity, Hall of Future Resources, Hall of Participation
- Host & Organizer : Wando County, Jeolla-namdo, Wando Seaweeds Expo Committee
- Sponsors : Ministry of Oceans and Fisheries, Suhyup, NH Nonghyup Bank, Korea Rural Community Corporation, Korea Agro-Fisheries & Food Trade Corporation, Korea Fisheries Resources Agency, Cheonan Nonsan Expressway

==== Characteristics of 2017 Expo ====
Closed on May 7, 2015, Wando Seaweeds Expo was visited by 937,000 or so people from home or abroad.

Of its exhibition halls, Hall of Marine Mysteries, Hall of Healthy Humankind, and Hall of Future Resources were installed on barges at sea, while Hall of Marine Mysteries presented various images of seaweeds in 3D on a 360-degree water screen.

Also, a VR system was installed in Hall of Earth Environment to let the viewers get a vivid experience of the seaweed forest under the sea.
