= Gageodo =

Island in South Korea

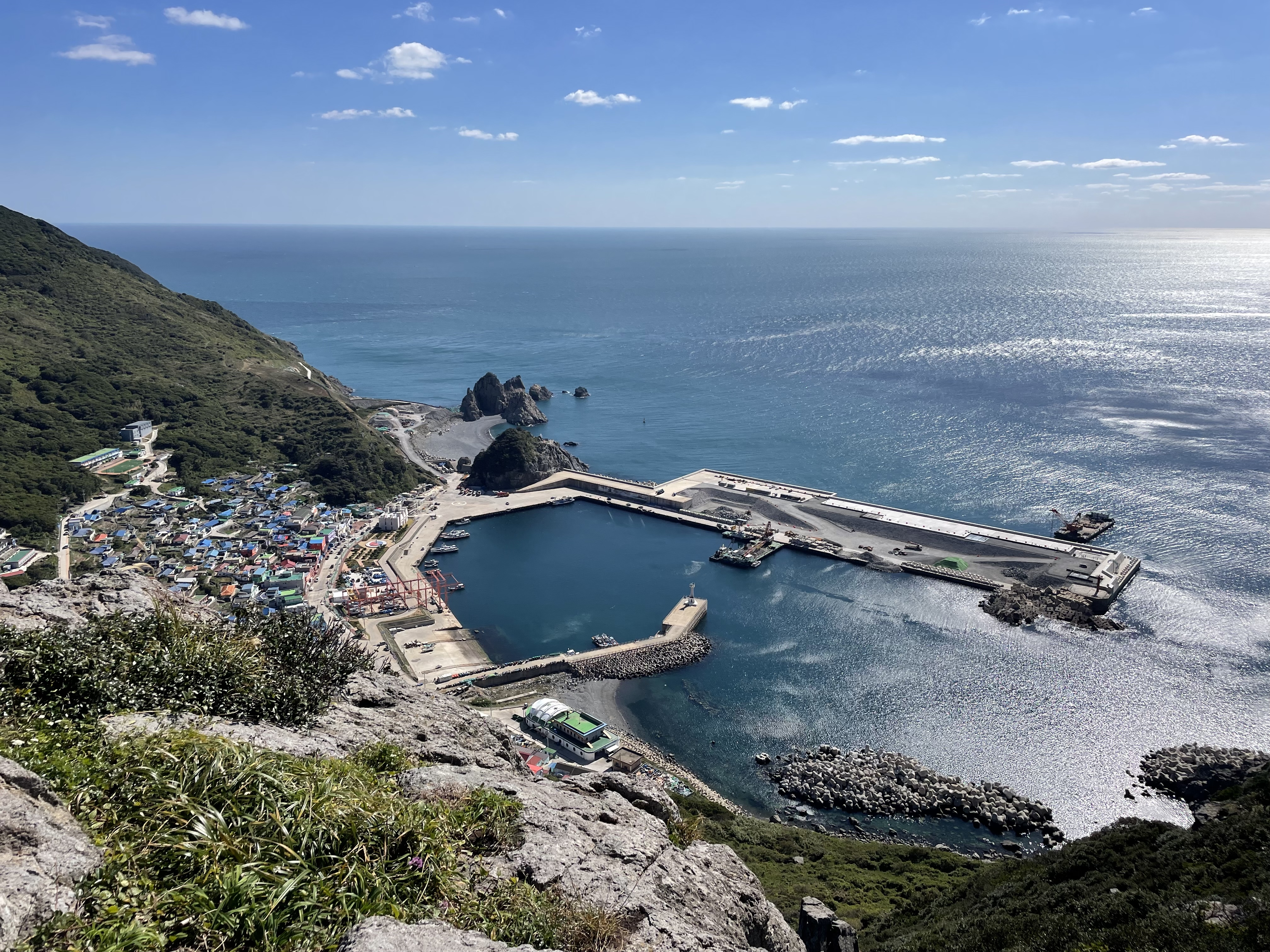
- Gageodo Fishing Port
- Interactive map of Gageodo

Geography
- Coordinates: 34°04′17″N 125°06′47″E

Korean name
- Hangul: 가거도
- Hanja: 可居島
- RR: Gageodo
- MR: Kagŏdo

Soheuksando
- Hangul: 소흑산도
- Hanja: 小黑山島
- RR: Soheuksando
- MR: Sohŭksando

Gageodo (Korean: 가거도), also known as Soheuksando due to its location near Heuksan-do, is the southwestern-most island of South Korea in the Yellow Sea. It is within the administrative boundaries of Sinan County, Jeollanam-do, South Korea, and is connected by the Namhae Star ferry to the city of Mokpo. The island's 9.2 square kilometres (3.6 sq mi) are home to about 470 people.

Gageodo has been a trading port with China since the Unified Silla period.

The Gageodo anchovy fishing song(s) were declared part of Jeollanam-do's intangible natural heritage in 1988.

Gageodo is meteorologically significant, due to its location near the southern limit of the Yellow Sea Cold Current. In 2005, the South Korean government announced plans for a marine science base on the island.

== See also ==
- Islands of South Korea
