= Song Gisuk =

South Korean writer (1935–2021)

- Born: 5 July 1935; Changhung, Jeollanam-do, Korea
- Died: 5 December 2021 (aged 86)
- Writing career
- Language: Korean

Korean name
- Hangul: 송기숙
- Hanja: 宋基淑
- RR: Song Gisuk
- MR: Song Kisuk

Song Gisuk (Korean: 송기숙; 5 July 1935 – 5 December 2021) was a South Korean writer of novels, short stories, and essay.

== Life ==
Song Gisuk was born on 5 July 1935 in Changhung, Jeollanam-do, Korea. Song graduated with an M.A. from Chonnam University in Korea in 1961, and an M.A. from the same university, also in Korean, in 1964. Song worked as a professor at Chonnam National University and was arrested for writing the Declaration of the Democratization of Education. While he was eventually released, he was dismissed from his professorship. In 1980 Song was arrested again for being involved in the 18 May Gwangju Uprising, and released the following year. He then worked as a professor of Korean Literature at Chonnam.

== Work ==
The Korea Literature Translation Institute summarizes Song's contributions to Korean literature:

Song Gisuk’s writing is motivated by the desire to embrace the lives of common people and capture the continuity that marks their existence in Korean history, ranging from the feudal era through the Japanese colonial rule to the age of national division. This desire is clearly evident in An Elegy of Jaratgol (Jaratgorui biga, 1977) which deals with tragedy that envelops the three generations of an ordinary family in a remote Jeolla village. With the burial grounds in Jaratgol as the backdrop, the novel narrates retrospectively the series of events that has resulted in much conflict and grief in this small village, and ends on a positive note as the younger generation of villagers succeed in eliminating the cause of the tragedy. A similar faith in the spirit of resistance among ordinary people, especially the younger generation, can be glimpsed in Amtae Island (Amtaedo, 1981) and “The Mungbean General” (Nokdu janggun). Amtae Island focuses on the conflict between landowners and tenant farmers on Amtaedo during the period of the Japanese colonial rule, and establishes tenant farmers as brave fighters who struggle to achieve self-actualization against the oppressive social machinery. In “The Mungbean General”, Song Gisuk takes as his subject the Gabo Peasant Rebellion and highlights its anti-feudal and anti-foreign character. This work reveals the author's valorization of the historical event as the culmination of the anti-feudal consciousness that began to form among peasants in late-Joseon period.

== Works in Korean (Partial) ==
Novels

- An Elegy of Charatgol (1977)
- The Amtae Island (1981)

Short Stories

- The White-Clad Race
- The Goblins Banquet
- An Unlucky Return to Old Hometown in Glory
- Why Do Dogs Bark?
- And Other, And You
- Terrorist
- Mother's Flag
- Blue Bird

Essays

- When the Flowers of Mung Beans Fail

== Awards ==
- 1973 Contemporary Literature (Hyundae Munhak) Award for his collection of stories, The White-clad Race (Baegui minjok)
