= Sinjido =

Island in South Korea

Coordinates: 34°19′N 126°48′E

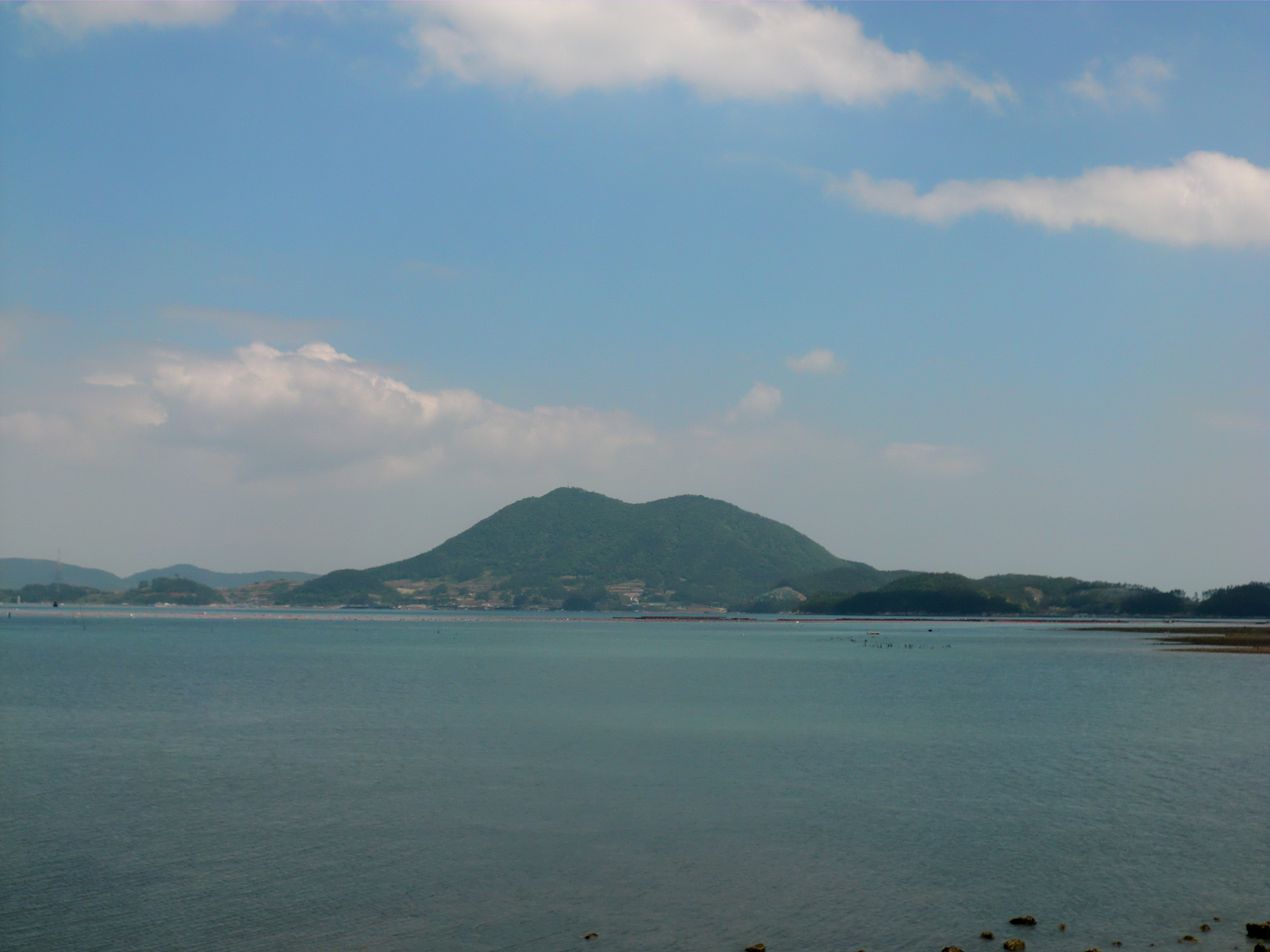

Korean name
- Hangul: 신지도
- Hanja: 薪智島
- RR: Sinjido
- MR: Sinjido

Sinjido (Korean: 신지도) is an island located off the coast of South Jeolla Province, South Korea. It covers an area of 30.99 km^{2}, and has a coast line which is 48.0 km long. It features several peaks: Sang-san (324 m), Nohak-bong (225 m), Beom-san (151 m), and Giseon-bong (141 m). A bridge connecting Wando County and Sinjido was completed in 2005, and another, connecting Sinjido to Gogeum, was completed in 2017.

In 2021, the population was 3,312.

== See also ==
- Islands of South Korea
- South Jeolla Province
- Korea Strait
