= Cheongsando =

Island in South Korea

- Location within South Korea

Geography
- Location: Korea Strait
- Coordinates: 34°10′N 126°51′E
- Area: 32.963 km^{2} (12.727 sq mi)
- Highest elevation: 385 m (1263 ft)
- Highest point: Mabongsan

Administration
- South Korea
- Province: South Jeolla
- Largest settlement: Cheongsando (pop. 2,182)

Demographics
- Ethnic groups: Korean

Korean name
- Hangul: 청산도
- Hanja: 靑山島
- RR: Cheongsando
- MR: Ch'ŏngsando

Cheongsando (Korean: 청산도) is an island off the south coast of the Republic of Korea. It is the main island of Cheongsan-myeon, Wando County, South Jeolla Province. Accompanied by the four inhabited islands of Daemodo, Somodo, Yeoseodo, and Jangdo, and several uninhabited islands, it is called Cheongsando ('green mountain island') because it remains green through four seasons. It has long been called Seonsan or Seonwon, meaning that a Taoist hermit dwells on the island because of the beautiful view which creates a harmony with the clear and blue archipelago.

== Culture ==
=== Gudeuljangnon Paddy field ===
Cheongsando has a traditional agricultural system. It has long abounded in steep terrains and stones as well as sandy soil where water drains away quickly. Short of water for paddy rice farming, the area has a rather unfavorable agricultural environment for watery field farming. 'Gudeuljangnon Paddy field' is a paddy field artificially created by reorganizing natural environment to produce more rice in such unfavorable conditions.

Cheongsando 'Gudeuljangnon Paddy field' in Wando County was designated Republic of Korea's Important Agricultural Heritage No. 1 on January 22, 2013 according to the strict criteria of value, partnership, and effectiveness of heritage in deference to Globally Important Agricultural Heritage Systems (GIAHS) of Food and Agriculture Organization of the United Nations (FAO).

=== Slow Walk ===
Designated as the first Slow City in Asia, Cheongsando in Wando-gun hosts the annual Cheongsando Slow Walking Festival.

Cheongsando Slow Walk used to be a trail for the mobility of the island residents. It was named so, because the walkers would naturally slow down, touched by the scenic view. 2010 saw the opening of the total 11 courses (17-gil) stretching 42.195km.

Characteristically, the courses are designed so that the walkers can see a mix of the scenery along the trail, people who dwell nearby, and stories related to different courses. The beauty of the trail got its outside recognition, and in 2011 it was designated as World Slow Walk No. 1 by Cittaslow International.

=== Filming ===
The island drew attention as a tourist attraction after it served as a shooting location for the film Seopyeonje (서편제) by Im Kwon-taek. The television dramas Spring Waltz and Scent of a Woman were also partially filmed at the island.
