= Modo, Jindo =

Island in South Korea

Modo
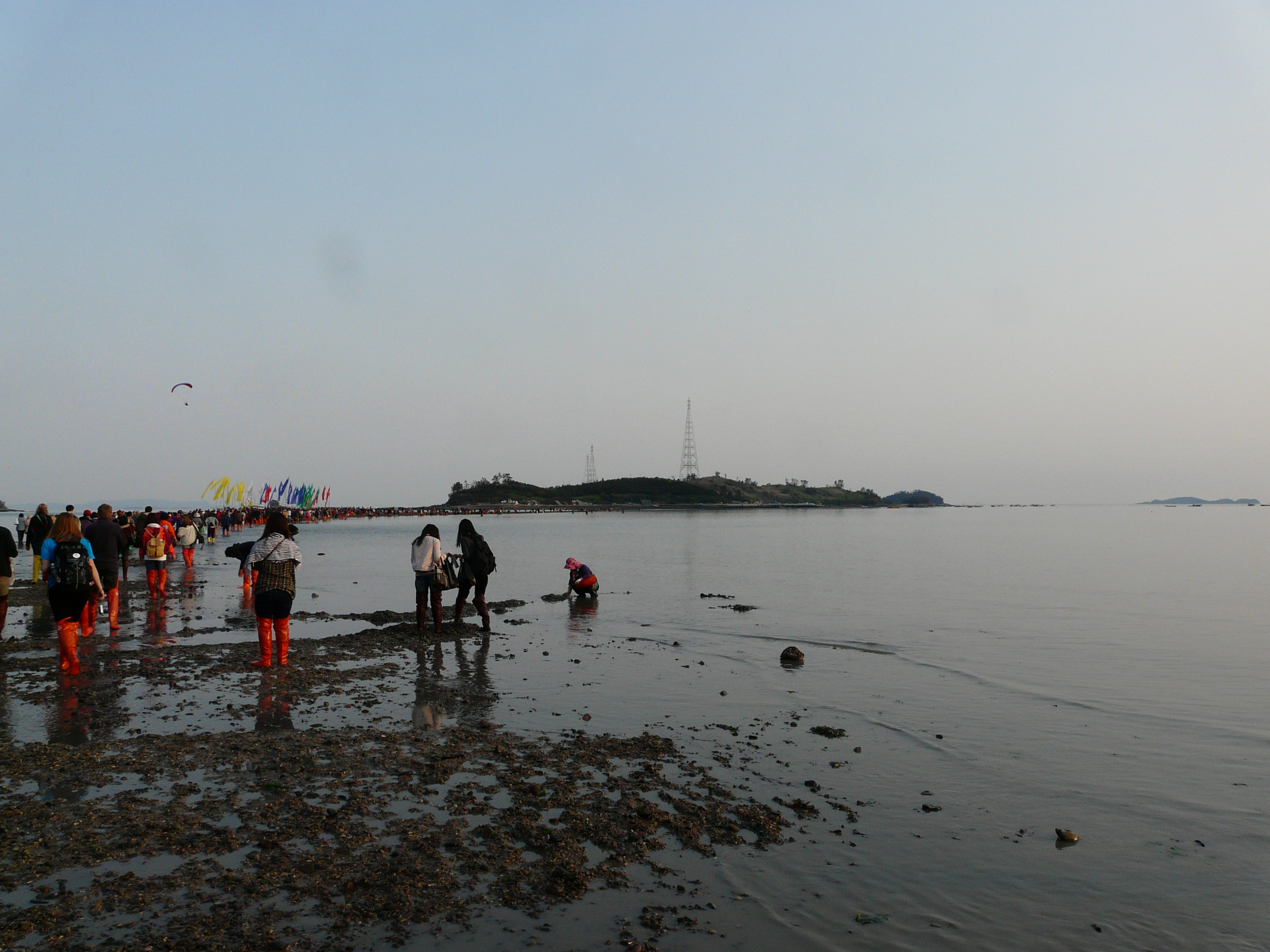

- Location within South Korea

Geography
- Location: Yellow Sea, East China Sea
- Coordinates: 34.406°N 126.355°E
- Length: 1.1 km (0.68 mi)

Administration
- South Korea
- Province: South Jeolla
- County: Jindo County

Korean name
- Hangul: 모도
- Hanja: 茅島
- RR: Modo
- MR: Modo

Modo (Korean: 모도) is a small island in Jindo County, South Jeolla Province, South Korea, just off the southwest corner of the Korean peninsula. It is located to the south-east of Jindo Island and is about 1.1 km (0.68 mi) long and 300 m (980 ft) wide.

The tide-related sea level variations result in a land pass 2.9 km (1.8 mi) long and 10–40 meters wide opening for approximately an hour between Modo and Jindo islands. The event occurs roughly twice a year, around April–June. It had long been celebrated in a local festival called "Jindo's Sea Way", but was largely unknown to the world until 1975, when the French ambassador Pierre Randi described the phenomenon in a French newspaper. Nowadays, nearly half a million foreign and local tourists attend the event annually. It is accompanied by local festivals which include Ganggangsuwollae (Korean traditional circle dance), Ssitkim-gut (a shaman ritual, consoling the souls of the dead), Deul Norae (traditional farmers' songs), Manga (burial ceremony songs), Jindo dog show, Buknori (drum performance) and fireworks.
