= Hauido =

Island in South Korea

Coordinates: 34°35′58″N 126°02′15″E

- Hangul: 하의도
- Hanja: 荷衣島
- RR: Hauido
- MR: Haŭido

Hauido (Korean: 하의도) is an island off the South Korean coast in the Yellow Sea, part of Sinan County in South Jeolla Province. Its name means 'a lotus floating on water' and although it is an island by name, it actually comprises 56 separate islands, only nine of which are inhabited. Approximately 57 kilometers to shore, it has an area of 14.46 km² and is home to more than 1,900 people. It was the birthplace of former South Korean president Kim Dae-jung.

== See also ==
- Islands of South Korea
