= Yeoseodo =

Island in South Korea

Coordinates: 33°58′27″N 126°55′12″E

- Hangul: 여서도
- Hanja: 麗瑞島
- RR: Yeoseodo
- MR: Yŏsŏdo

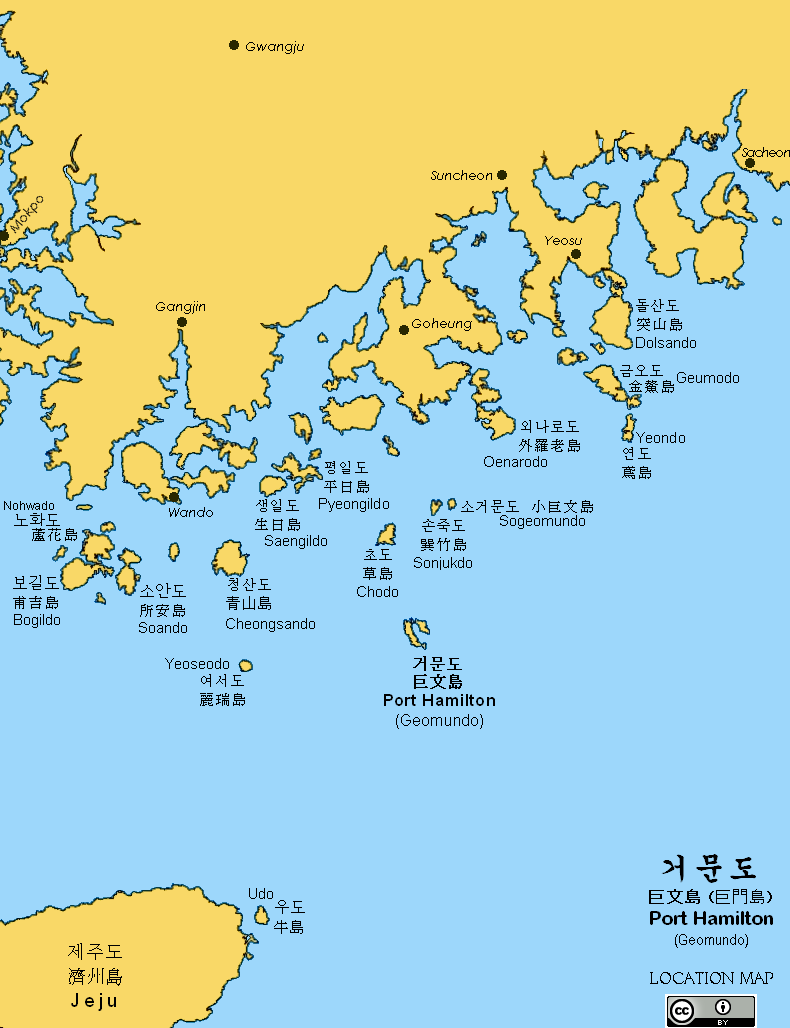
Location of Yeoseodo in the Jeju Strait (slightly left of Port Hamilton)

Yeoseodo (Korean: 여서도) is an island located off the coast of Jeollanam-do, South Korea, in the Jeju Strait. It covers an area of 2.51 square kilometres (0.97 square miles) and is home to approximately 100 residents (as of 2001). The landscape features one peak, an unnamed mountain 352 metres (1,155 feet) high. Its residents work as both farmers and fishermen, and its main agricultural products include sweet potato, wheat, rice, bean, and sesame.

== In popular culture ==
- K-pop boy group Seventeen (South Korean band) filmed a reality show, Seventeen's One Fine Day (also known as 13 Castaway Boys), on Yeoseodo in 2016.

== See also ==
- Islands of South Korea
- Jeollanam-do
