= Yellow Sea =

Sea in northeast Asia between China and Korea

- Location within China
- Location: East Asia
- Coordinates: 38°0′N 123°0′E
- River sources: Yellow River, Hai River, Yalu River, Taedong River, Han River
- Basin countries: China, North Korea, and South Korea
- Surface area: 380,000 km^{2} (150,000 sq mi)
- Average depth: Avg. 44 m (144 ft)
- Max. depth: Max. 152 m (499 ft)

Yellow Sea
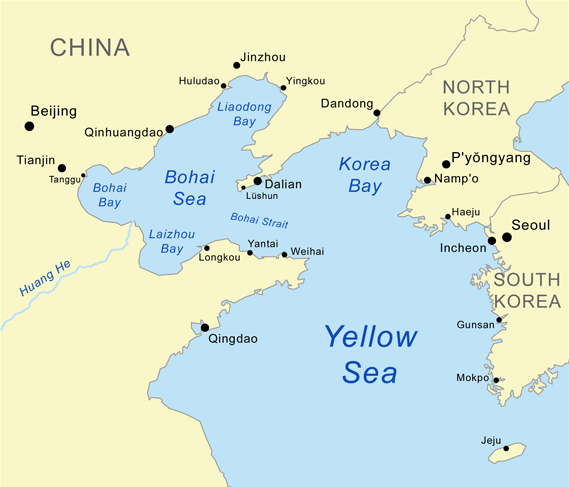
- The yellow sea between Qingdao and South Korea

Chinese name
- Simplified Chinese: 黄海
- Traditional Chinese: 黃海
- Literal meaning: Yellow Sea
Transcriptions
Standard Mandarin
- Hanyu Pinyin: Huáng Hǎi
- Bopomofo: ㄏㄨㄤˊ ㄏㄞˇ
Wu
- Romanization: Waon^{入} Hae^{平}
Yue: Cantonese
- Jyutping: Wong^{4} Hoi^{2}

Korean name
- Hangul: 황해 or 서해
- Hanja: 黃海 or 西海
- Literal meaning: Yellow Sea or West Sea
Transcriptions
- Revised Romanization: Hwanghae or Seohae
- McCune–Reischauer: Hwanghae or Sŏhae

The Yellow Sea (simplified Chinese: 黄海; traditional Chinese: 黃海; pinyin: Huáng Hǎi; Zhuyin Fuhao: ㄏㄨㄤˊ ㄏㄞˇ; Korean: 황해; Hanja: 黃海; RR: Hwanghae), also known as the North Sea, is a marginal sea of the Western Pacific Ocean located between mainland China and the Korean Peninsula, and can be considered the northwestern part of the East China Sea.

== Names ==
It is one of four seas named after color terms (the others being the Black Sea, the Red Sea and the White Sea), and its name is descriptive of the golden-yellow color of the silt-ridden water discharged from major rivers.

The innermost bay of northwestern Yellow Sea is called the Bohai Sea (previously Gulf of Zhili / Beizhili), into which flow some of the most important rivers of northern China, such as the Yellow River (through Shandong province and its capital Jinan), the Hai River (through Beijing and Tianjin) and the Liao River (through Liaoning province). The northeastern extension of the Yellow Sea is called the Korea Bay, into which flow the Yalu River, the Chongchon River and the Taedong River.

== Geography ==
=== Extent ===
The International Hydrographic Organization defines the limits of the Yellow Sea ("Hwang Hai") as follows:

The Yellow Sea is separated from the Sea of Japan by the boundary from the southern end of Haenam Peninsula in Jeollanamdo to Jeju Island and divided into the East China Sea by the boundary from the west end of Jeju Island to the Yangtze River estuary.

=== Physiography ===
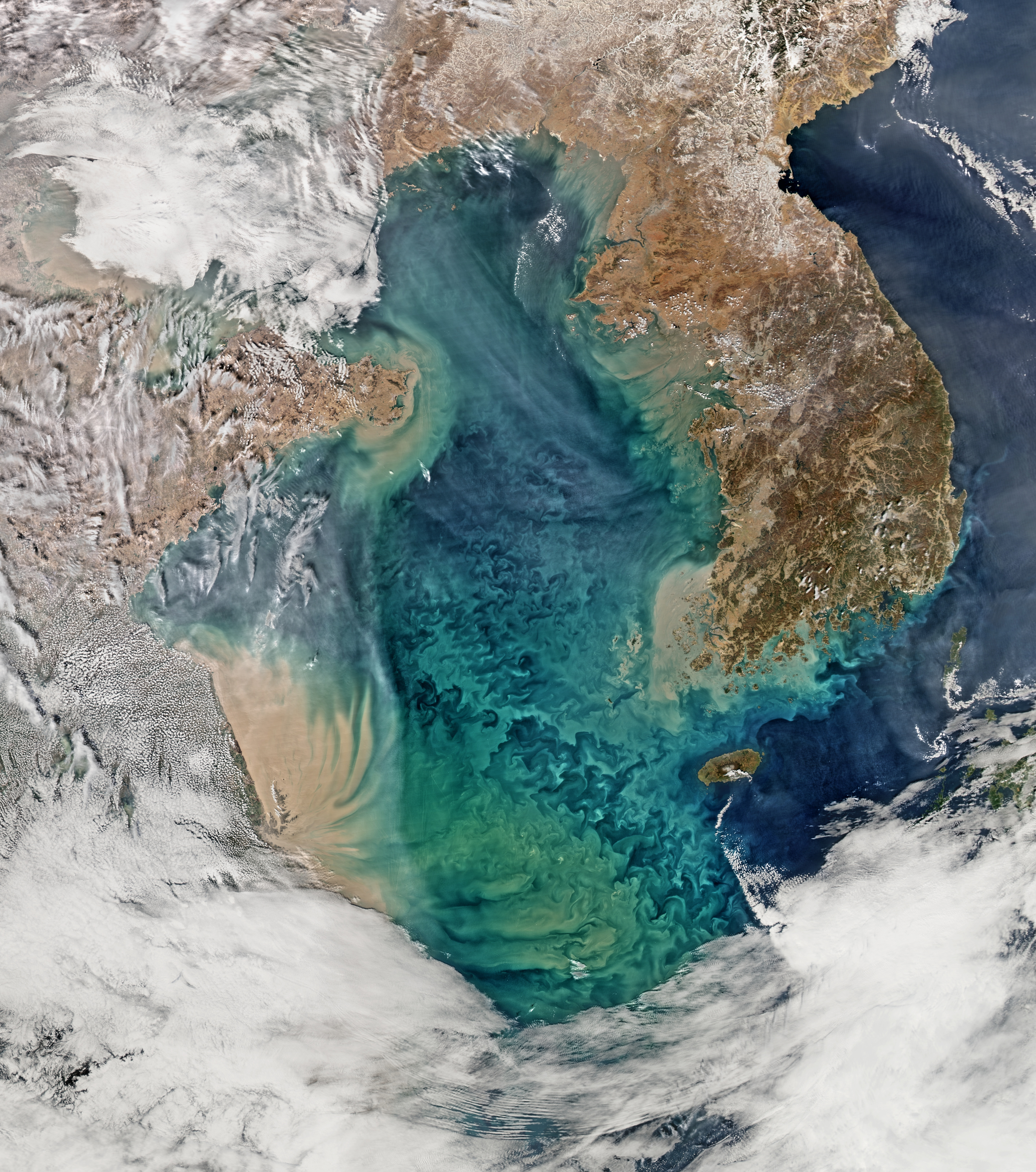
Brown sediment spills out into the Yellow Sea from rivers in eastern China and Korea. The nutrients in the sediment may be responsible for the bloom of phytoplankton seen as blue-green swirls.

The Yellow Sea, excluding the Bohai, extends by about 960 km (600 mi) from north to south and about 700 km (430 mi) from east to west; it has an area of approximately 380,000 km^{2} (150,000 sq mi) and a volume of about 17,000 km^{3} (4,100 cu mi). Its depth is only 44 m (144 ft) on average, with a maximum of 152 m (499 ft). The sea is a flooded section of continental shelf that formed after the last glacial period (some 10,000 years ago) as sea levels rose 120 m (390 ft) to their current levels. The depth gradually increases from north to south. The sea bottom and shores are dominated by sand and silt brought by the rivers through the Bohai Sea (Liao River, Yellow River, Hai He) and the Korea Bay (Yalu River). These deposits, together with sand storms are responsible for the yellowish colour of the water referenced in the sea's name. The sea annually receives so much sand and silt from rivers such as the Yellow River, that it turns into a golden-yellow colour.

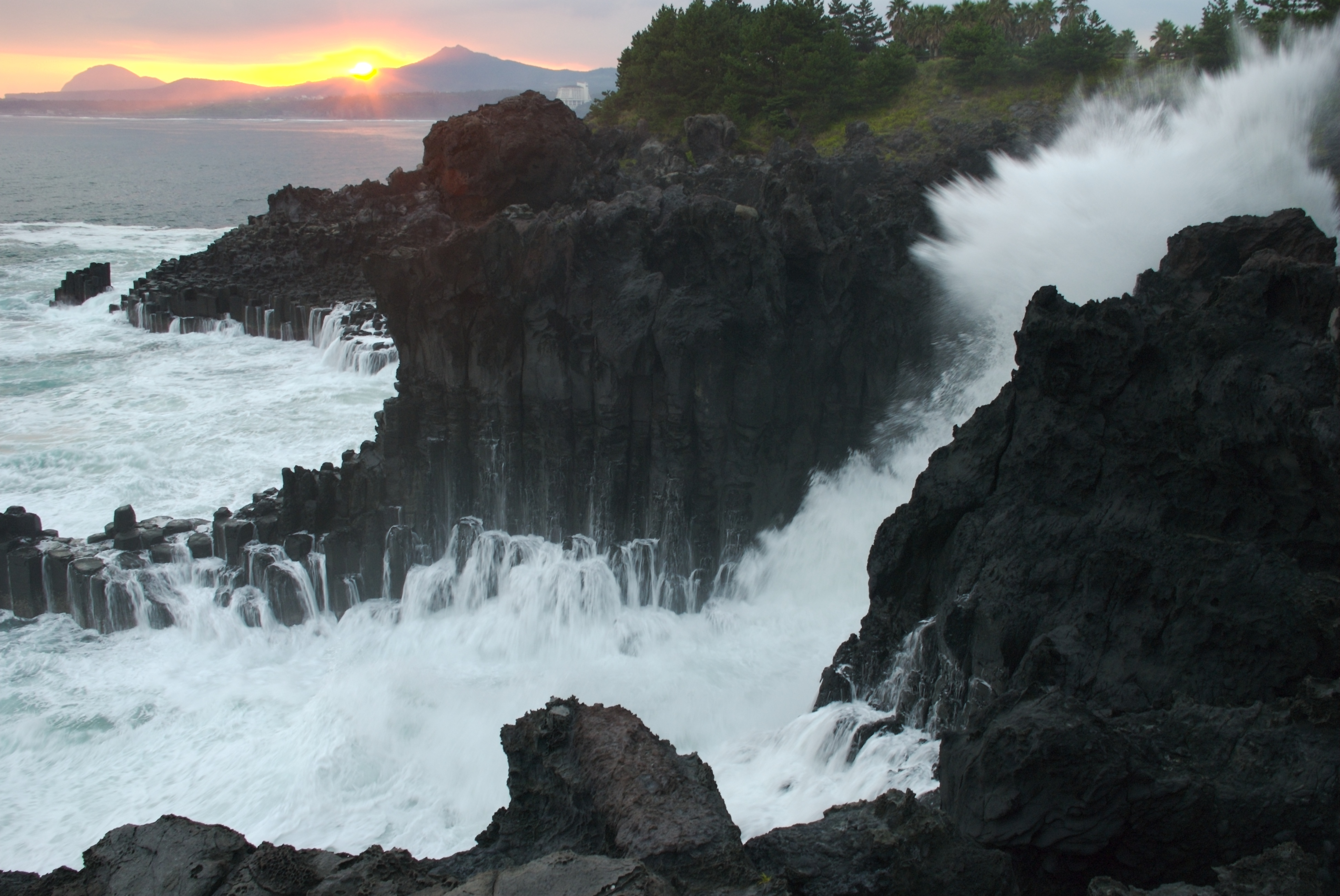
Waves crashing at Jeju Island

The seas surrounding Korea, which occupy a corner of Northeast Asia, border the "island nation" from the east, south, and west. Korea has named these the East Sea, South Sea, and West Sea (officially known as the Yellow Sea), respectively.

Major islands of the sea include Anmado, Baengnyeongdo, Daebudo, Deokjeokdo, Gageodo, Ganghwado, Hauido, Heuksando, Hongdo, Jejudo, Jindo, Muuido, Sido, Silmido, Sindo, Wando, Yeongjongdo and Yeonpyeongdo (all in South Korea).

=== Climate and hydrology ===
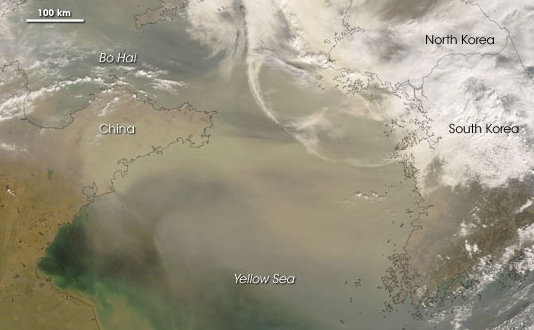
Satellite image of a dust storm over the Yellow sea on 2 March 2008

The area has cold, dry winters with strong northernly monsoons blowing from late November to March. Average January temperatures are −10 °C (14 °F) in the north and 3 °C (37 °F) in the south. Summers are wet and warm with frequent typhoons between June and October. Air temperatures range between 10 and 28 °C (50 and 82 °F). The average annual precipitation increases from about 500 mm (20 in) in the north to 1,000 mm (39 in) in the south. Fog is frequent along the coasts, especially in the upwelling cold-water areas.

The sea has a warm cyclone current, forming part of the Kuroshio Current, which diverges near the western part of Japan and flows northward into the Yellow Sea at a speed of less than 0.8 km/h (0.50 mph). Southward currents prevail near the sea coast, especially in the winter monsoon period.

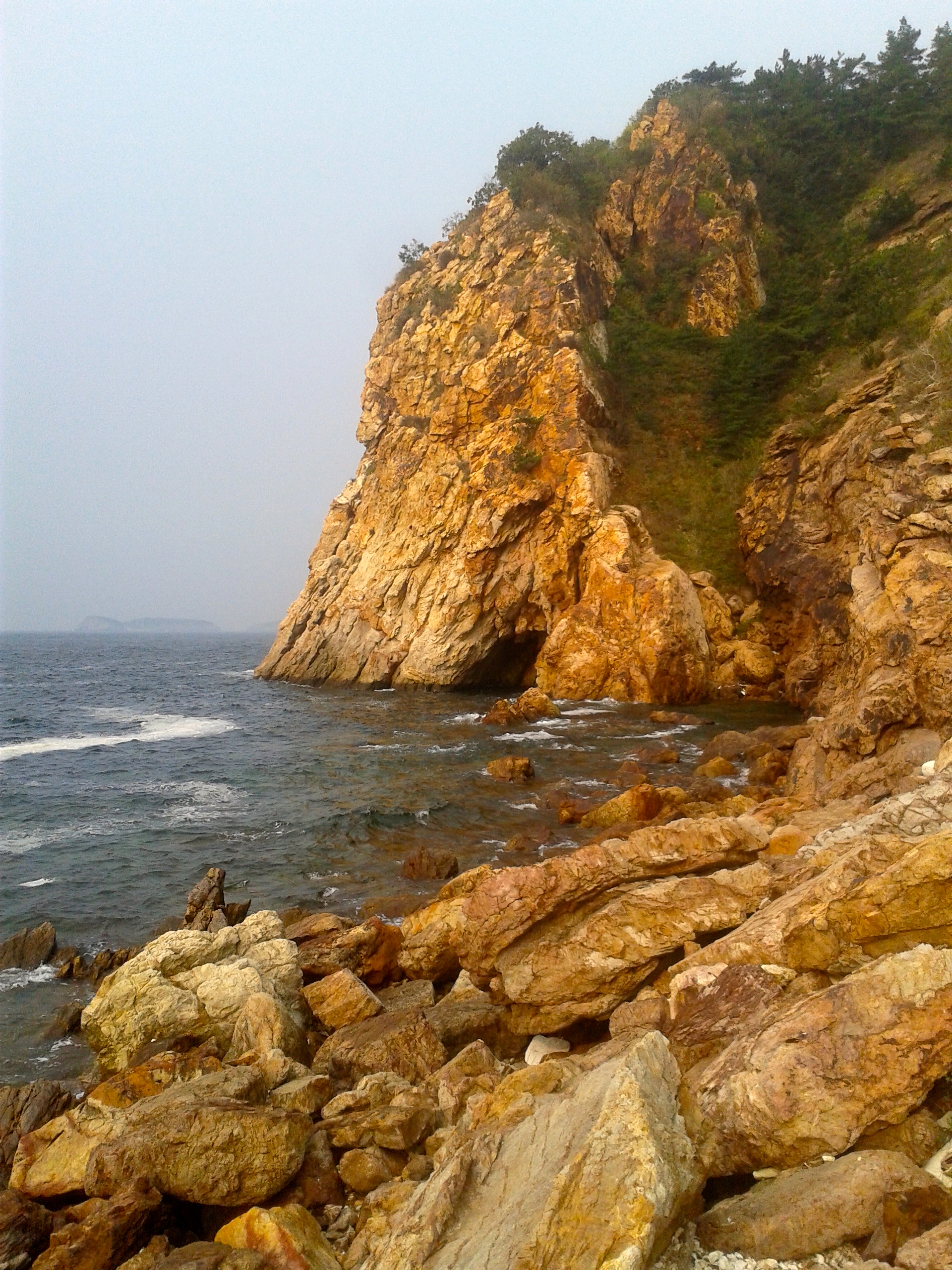
Rocky shore in Dalian, Liaoning, China

The water temperature is close to freezing in the northern part in winter, so drift ice patches and continuous ice fields form and hinder navigation between November and March. The water temperature and salinity are homogeneous across the depth. The southern waters are warmer at 6–8 °C (43–46 °F). In spring and summer, the upper layer is warmed up by the sun and diluted by the fresh water from rivers, while the deeper water remains cold and saline. This deep water stagnates and slowly moves south. Commercial bottom-dwelling fishes are found around this mass of water, especially at its southern part. Summer temperatures range between 22 and 28 °C (72 and 82 °F). The average salinity is relatively low, at 30‰ in the north to 33–34‰ in the south, dropping to 26‰ or lower near the river deltas. In the southwest monsoon season (June to August) the increased rainfall and runoff further reduce the salinity of the upper sea layer. Water transparency increases from about 10 meters (33 ft) in the north up to 45 meters (148 ft) in the south.

Tides are semidiurnal, i.e. rise twice a day. Their amplitude varies between about 0.9 and 3 meters (3.0 and 9.8 ft) at the coast of China. Tides are higher at the Korean Peninsula, typically ranging between 4 and 8 meters (13 and 26 ft) and reaching the maximum in spring. The tidal system rotates in a counterclockwise direction. The speed of the tidal current is generally less than 1.6 km/h (0.99 mph) in the middle of the sea, but may increase to more than 5.6 km/h (3.5 mph) near the coasts. The fastest tides reaching 20 km/h (12 mph) occur in the Myeongnyang Strait between Jindo Island and the Korean Peninsula.

The tide-related sea level variations result in a land pass 2.9 km (1.8 mi) long and 10–40 meters (33–131 ft) wide opening for approximately an hour between Jindo and Modo islands. The event occurs about twice a year, at the beginning of May and in the middle of June. It had long been celebrated in a local festival called "Jindo Sea Parting Festival", but was largely unknown to the outside world until 1975, when the French ambassador Pierre Randi described the phenomenon in a French newspaper.

== Flora and fauna ==
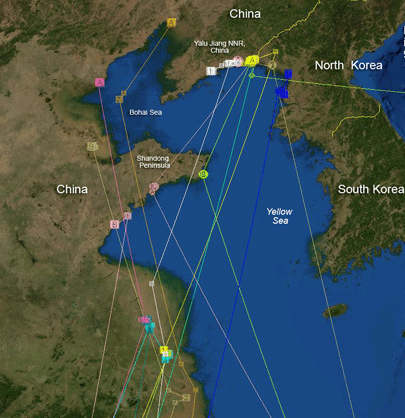
Migration paths and resting grounds of bar-tailed godwit at the Yellow Sea.

The sea is rich in seaweed (predominantly kelp, Laminaria japonica), cephalopods, crustaceans, shellfish, clams, and especially in blue-green algae which bloom in summer and contribute to the water color (see image above). For example, the seaweed production in the area was as high as 1.5 million tonnes in 1979 for China alone. The abundance of all these plant and animal species increases toward the south and indicates a high sea productivity, accounting for the diversity of fish species and high fish yield from the sea. Several species of goby new to science have been discovered recently in the Yellow Sea.

The southern part of the Yellow Sea, including the entire west coast of Korea, contains a 10 km-wide (6.2 mi) belt of intertidal mudflats, which has the total area of 2,850 km^{2} (1,100 sq mi) and is maintained by 4–10 m (13–33 ft). Those flats consist of highly productive sediments with a rich benthic fauna and are of great importance for migratory waders and shorebirds. Surveys show that the area is the single most important site for migratory birds on northward migration in the entire East Asian – Australasian Flyway, with more than 35 species occurring in internationally significant numbers. Two million birds, at minimum, pass through at the time, and about half that number use it on southward migration. About 300,000 migrating birds were transiting annually only through the Saemangeum tidal flat area. This estuary was however dammed by South Korea in 1991–2006 that resulted in drying off the land. Land reclamation also took 65% of the intertidal area (of China, North Korea and South Korea) between the 1950s and 2002, and as of 2005 there were plans to reclaim a further 45%.

Populations of oceanic megafauna, such as marine mammals, sea turtles, and larger fish, have decreased in modern times, not only due to pollution but also due to hunting. Japanese industrial whaling and illegal mass operations by the Soviet Union with support from Japan have been major drivers of population decline. Species that reside in the area today include spotted seals, and cetaceans such as minke whales, killer whales, false killer whales, and finless porpoises, but nonetheless all the remnants of species listed could be in very small numbers. Historically, large whales were abundant either for summering and wintering in the Yellow and Bohai Seas. For example, a unique population of resident fin whales and gray whales were historically presented, or possibly hosted some North Pacific right whales and Humpback whales (3 whales including a cow calf pair was observed at Changhai County in 2015) year-round other than migrating individuals, and many other migratory species such as Baird's beaked whales. Even blue whales, Japanese sea lions, dugongs (in southern regions only), and leatherback turtles used to breed or migrate into Yellow and Bohai seas.

Spotted seals are the only resident species of seal in the Yellow Sea. A sanctuary for these seals is situated at Baengnyeongdo, which is also known for its finless porpoises. Great white sharks have also been known to prey on seals in the area.

== Economy ==
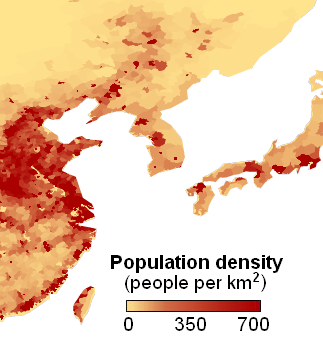
A map of population density around the Yellow Sea in East Asia (1994)

The coasts of the Yellow Sea are very densely populated, at approximately 250 inhabitants per square kilometer (650/sq mi). The sea waters had been used for fishing by the Chinese, Korean and Japanese ships for centuries. The bottom layers are especially rich in fish with about 200 fish species exploited commercially, especially sea bream, croakers, lizard fishes, prawns, cutlassfish, horse mackerel, squid, eel, filefish, Pacific herring, chub mackerel, flounder and jellyfish. The intensity of fishing has been gradually increasing for China and Korea and decreasing for Japan. For example, the production volumes for China rose from 619,000 tonnes in 1985 to 1,984,400 tonnes in 1996. All species are overfished, however, and while the total catchments are rising, the fish population is continuously declining for most species.

Navigation is another traditional activity in the Yellow Sea. The main Chinese ports are Dalian, Tianjin, Yantai, Qingdao, Tangshan and Qinhuangdao. The major South Korean ports on the Yellow Sea are Incheon, Gunsan and Mokpo, and that for North Korea is Nampho, the outport of Pyongyang. The Bohai Train Ferry provides a shortcut between the Liaodong Peninsula and Shandong. A major naval accident occurred on 24 November 1999 at Yantai, Shandong, China when the 9,000-ton Chinese ferry Dashun caught fire and capsized in rough seas. About 300 people were killed, making it the worst maritime incident in China.

Oil exploration has been successful in the Chinese and North Korean portions of the sea, with the proven and estimated reserves of about 9 and 20 billion tonnes, respectively. However, the study and exploration of the sea is somewhat hindered by insufficient sharing of information between the involved countries. China initiated collaborations with foreign oil companies in 1979, but this initiative declined later.

A major oil spill occurred on 16 July 2010 when a pipeline exploded at the north-east port of Dalian, causing a wide-scale fire and spreading about 1,500 tonnes of oil over the sea area of 430 km^{2} (170 sq mi). The port had been closed and fishing suspended until the end of August. Eight hundred fishing boats and 40 specialized vessels were mobilized to relieve the environmental damage.

== State of the environment ==
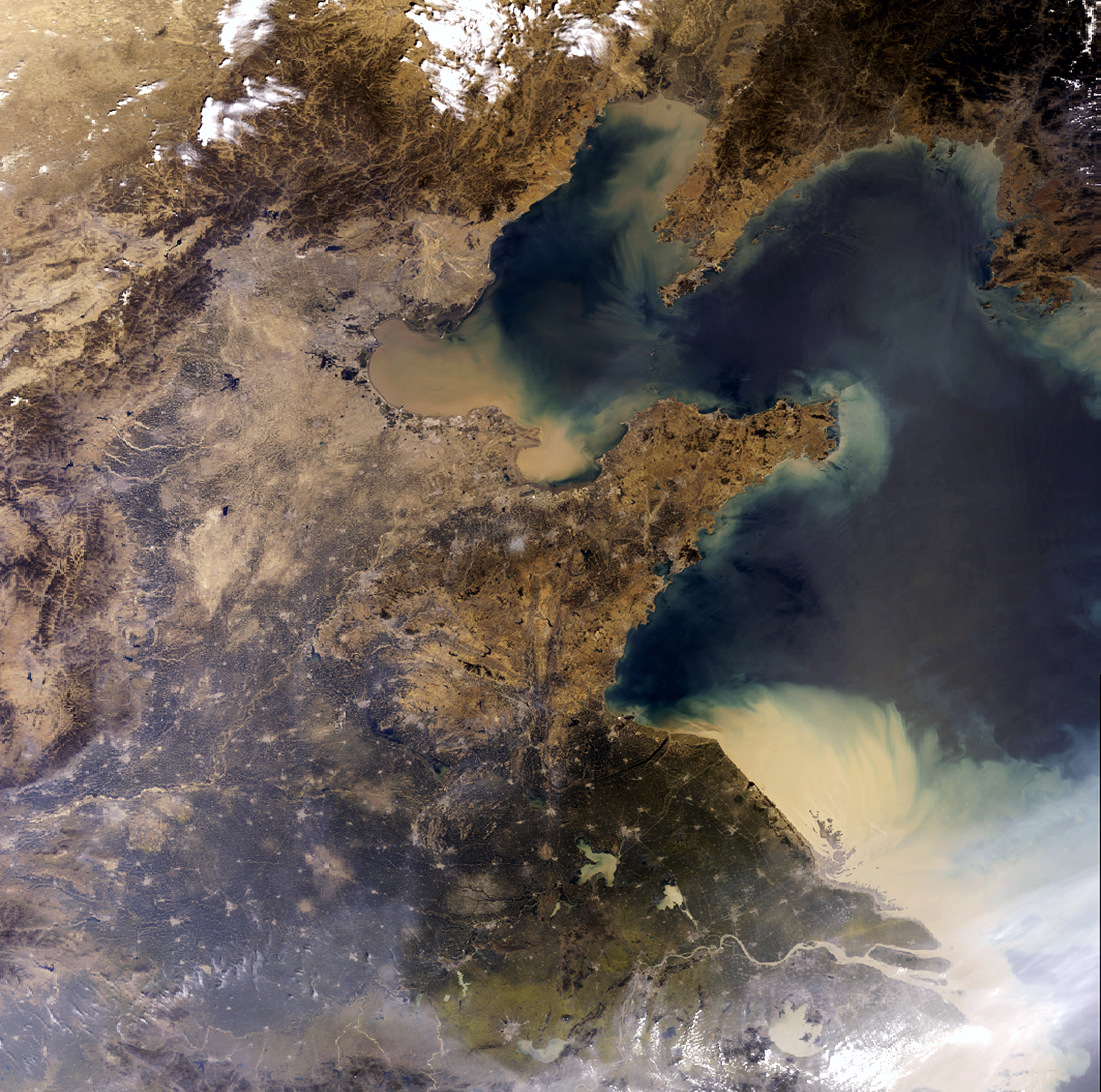
Envisat image, 2006

The Yellow Sea is considered among the most degraded marine areas on earth. Loss of natural coastal habitats due to land reclamation has resulted in the destruction of more than 60% of tidal wetlands around the Yellow Sea coastline in approximately 50 years. Rapid coastal development for agriculture, aquaculture and industrial development are considered the primary drivers of coastal destruction in the region. This degree of loss of area, widespread pollution, algal blooms and declines of invertebrate and vertebrate fauna have resulted in the classification of this ecosystem as endangered.

In addition to land reclamation, the Yellow Sea ecosystem is facing several other serious environmental problems. Pollution is widespread and deterioration of pelagic and benthic habitat quality has occurred, and harmful algal blooms frequently occur. Invasion of introduced species are having a detrimental effect on the Yellow Sea environment. There are 25 intentionally introduced species and 9 unintentionally introduced species in the Yellow Sea Large Marine Ecosystem. Declines of biodiversity, fisheries and ecosystem services in the Yellow Sea are widespread.

The tidal flats of the Yellow Sea are considered endangered.

== Location of Korean Peace Zones ==
On 1 November 2018, officials from South Korea's Ministry of National Defense confirmed that "peace zones" had been established by the North and South Korean militaries in the Yellow Sea area that touches the North and South Korean demarcation line. A buffer zone was also created in the Yellow Sea's Northern Limit Line (NLL).

== See also ==
- Battle of Chemulpo Bay
- Battle of the Yellow Sea
- Geography of China
- Geography of North Korea
- Geography of South Korea
- Ganghwa Island incident
- Korea strait

== Bibliography ==
- Chikuni, S. (1985). The Fish Resources of the Northwest Pacific, Food and Agriculture Organization, ISBN 92-5-102298-4
- From the Arctic Ocean to the Yellow Sea (1892). The narrative of a journey, in 1890 and 1891, across Siberia, Mongolia, the Gobi desert, and north China. Julius M. Price (1857–1924). New York: Charles Scribner's Sons.
