= Hyeongjeseom =

Islands in Jeju Province, South Korea

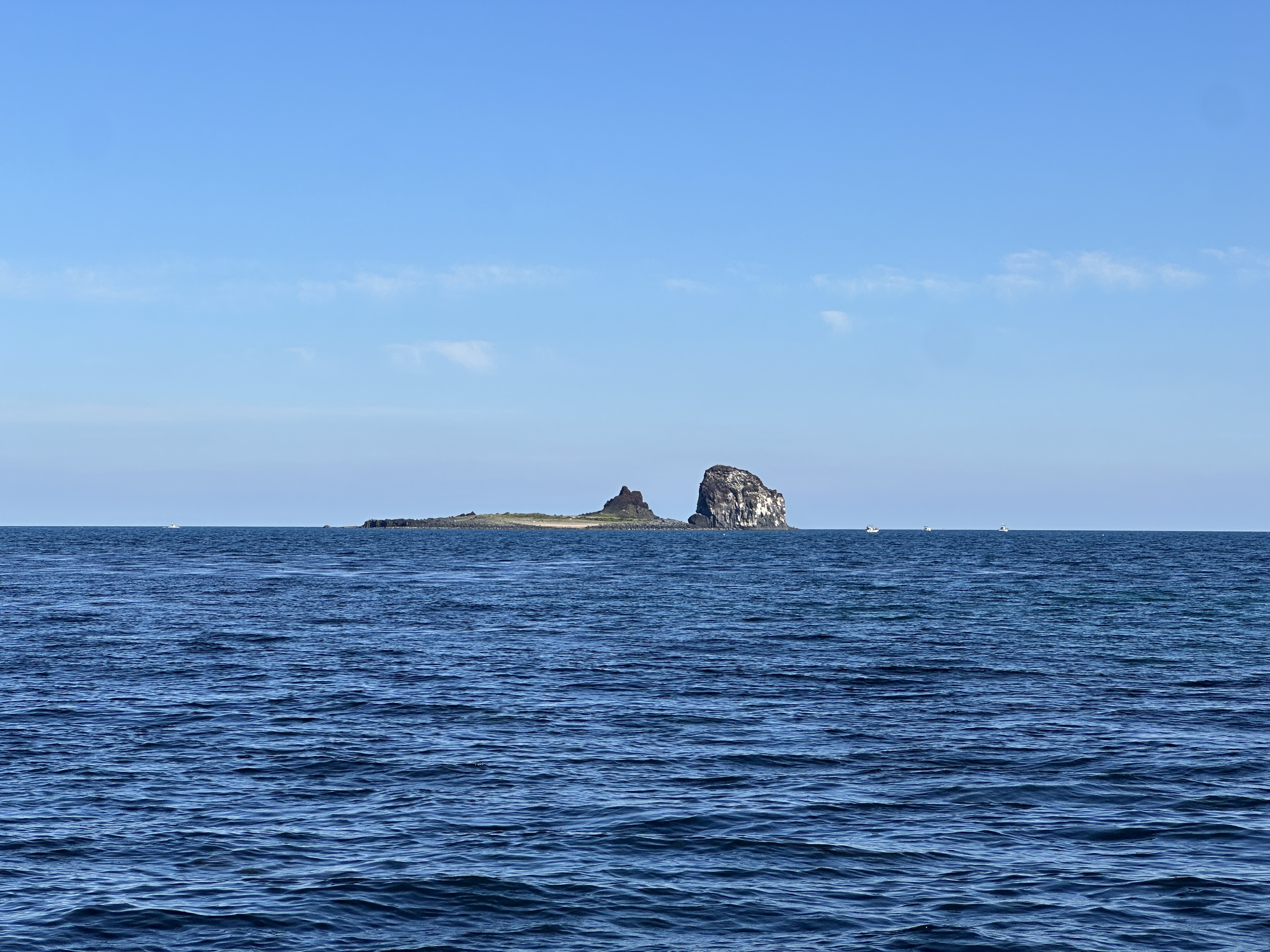
- The islands, viewed from Jeju Island (2024)
- Interactive map of Hyeongjeseom

Geography
- Coordinates: 33.209°N 126.314°E

Hyeongjeseom (Korean: 형제섬; Hanja: 兄弟섬; lit. 'Brother Islands'), also called Hyeongjedo (형제도; 兄弟島), refers to two small, adjacent uninhabited islands in Andeok-myeon, Seogwipo, Jeju Province, South Korea. The larger of the two islands is called Bonseom (본섬) and the smaller Otseom (옷섬). The islands are around 2 km (1.2 mi) off of the southern coast of Jeju Island.

One pre-modern historical text refers to the islands as Gwando (관도; 貫島). The name Hyoengjeseom refers to how the two islands appear like close brothers.

The islands are considered scenic, with tourists taking pictures of them. They are also popular for fishing and diving.
