= Sinan County, Jeonnam-Gwangju =

County in Jeonnam-Gwangju, South Korea

Coordinates: 34°49′39″N 126°06′04″E

Sinan
- County
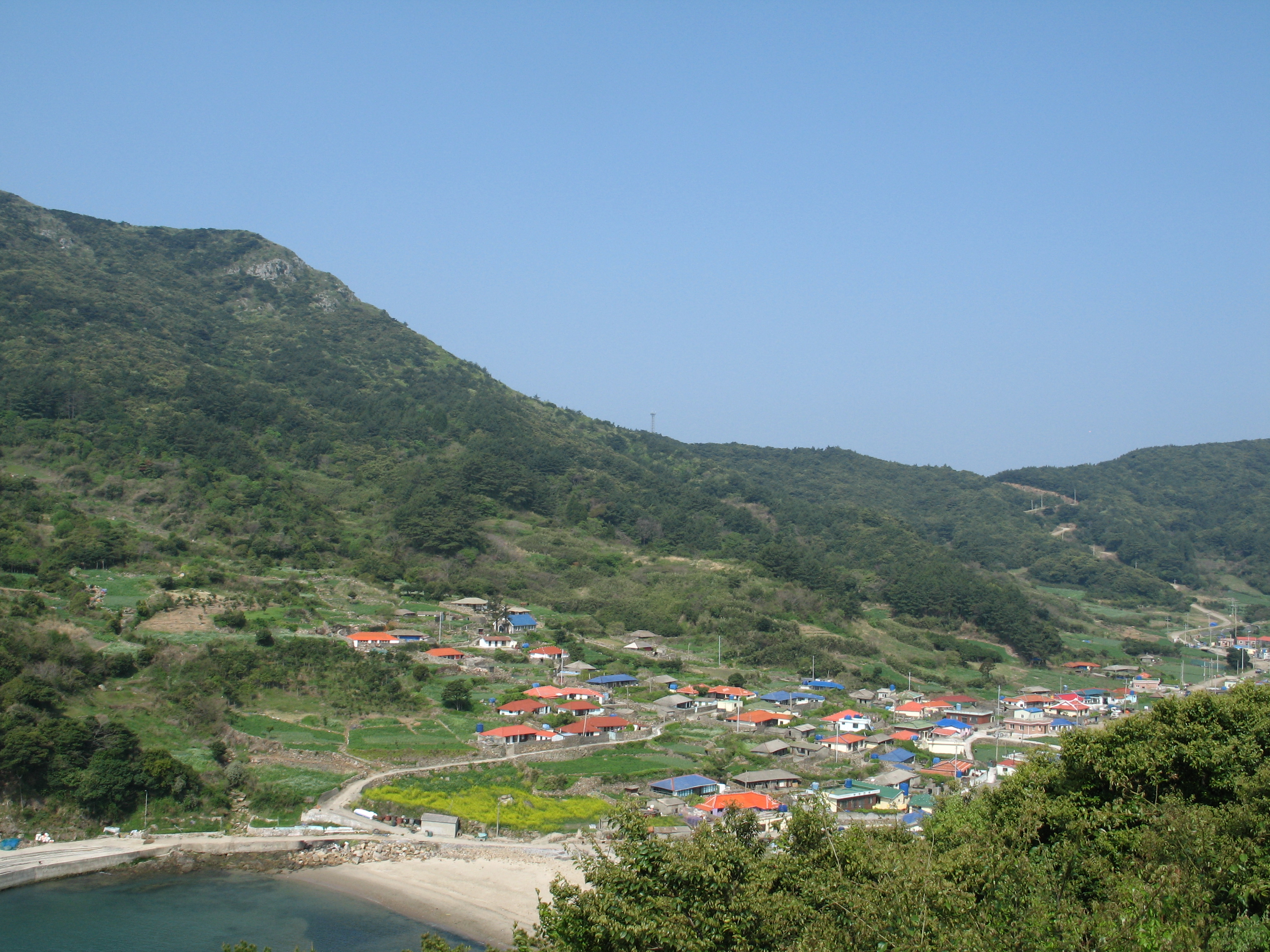
- A town in Heuksando, one of the islands in Sinan county.

- Flag Logo

- Location in South Korea
- Country: South Korea
- Provincial-level city: Jeonnam-Gwangju
- Administrative divisions: 2 eup, 12 myeon

Area
  - Total: 655.68 km^{2} (253.16 sq mi)

Population (September 2024)
  - Total: 38,133
  - Density: 81/km^{2} (210/sq mi)
  - Dialect: Jeolla
- Area code: +82-61-2xx

Korean name
- Hangul: 신안군
- Hanja: 新安郡
- RR: Sinan-gun
- MR: Sinan-gun

Sinan County (Korean: 신안군; sometimes spelled Shinan or Sinan-gun) is a county in Jeonnam-Gwangju, South Korea. The county consists of 111 inhabited islands and 719 uninhabited islands. The number of islands in this county accounts for 25% of all islands in South Korea.

Big islands among them are Anjwado (45.2 km^{2}), Aphaedo (44.3 km^{2}), Bigeumdo (43.1 km^{2}), Dochodo (40.3 km^{2}), Imjado (43.2 km^{2}), Amtaedo (38.7 km^{2}), Jeungdo (37.2 km^{2}), Jangsando (24.3 km^{2}), Haui-do (16.1 km^{2}), and Heuksando (19.7 km^{2}). The sea area is a continental shelf with less than 15 meters in depth. Sinan County is known for its specialities of skate and cheonilyeom (천일염, a Korean type of sea salt).

== History ==
In 1975, a shipwreck dating back to the 14th century was discovered in Sinan, known as the Shinan ship. It is thought to have been part of a Chinese trade fleet which sailed between China and Japan.

== Crime ==
Crime flourish in the more remote parts of Sinan islands. The more notable cases included the slavery on salt farms in Sinan County in 2014 and the Sinan County parents raping teacher case in 2016.

== Administrative divisions ==
Sinan County has two eup (읍) and twelve myeon (면).

Name	Hangul	Hanja	Area (km^{2})	Population (2021)
Jido-eup	지도읍	智島邑	79.85	4,226
Aphae-eup	압해읍	押海邑	67.55	5,795
Jeungdo-myeon	증도면	曾島面	33.68	1,463
Imja-myeon	임자면	荏子面	47.25	3,182
Jaeun-myeon	자은면	慈恩面	52.79	2,265
Bigeum-myeon	비금면	飛禽面	51.72	3,555
Docho-myeon	도초면	都草面	55.45	2,513
Heuksan-myeon	흑산면	黑山面	48.66	2,300
Haui-myeon	하의면	荷衣面	34.64	1,764
Sinui-myeon	신의면	新衣面	33.26	1,551
Jangsan-myeon	장산면	長山面	29.19	1,561
Anjwa-myeon	안좌면	安佐面	59.97	2,700
Palgeum-myeon	팔금면	八禽面	18.44	974
Amtae-myeon	암태면	岩泰面	43.23	2,043

== Islands ==
- Anjwado (안좌도, 安佐島): 45.2 km^{2}
- Aphaedo (압해도, 押海島): 44.3 km^{2}
- Bigeumdo (비금도, 飛禽島): 43.1 km^{2}
- Dochodo (도초도, 都草島): 40.3 km^{2}
- Imjado (임자도, 荏子島): 43.2 km^{2}
- Amtaedo (암태도, 岩泰島): 38.7 km^{2}
- Jeungdo (증도, 曾島): 37.2 km^{2}
- Jangsando (장산도, 長山島): 24.3 km^{2}
- Heuksando (흑산도, 黑山島): 19.7 km^{2}
- Hauido (하의도, 荷衣島): 16.1 km^{2}
- Gageodo (가거도, 可居島): 9.2 km^{2}
- Hongdo (홍도, 紅島): 6.47 km^{2}
- Uido (우이도; 牛耳島): 10.7 km^{2}

== Climate ==
Climate data for Heuksando, Sinan (1997–2020 normals, extremes 1997–present)
Month	Jan	Feb	Mar	Apr	May	Jun	Jul	Aug	Sep	Oct	Nov	Dec	Year
Record high °C (°F)	16.5 (61.7)	22.0 (71.6)	23.3 (73.9)	25.7 (78.3)	28.8 (83.8)	30.1 (86.2)	32.8 (91.0)	34.9 (94.8)	31.1 (88.0)	28.0 (82.4)	22.6 (72.7)	18.5 (65.3)	34.9 (94.8)
Mean daily maximum °C (°F)	5.5 (41.9)	6.5 (43.7)	9.9 (49.8)	14.5 (58.1)	19.1 (66.4)	22.8 (73.0)	25.9 (78.6)	27.9 (82.2)	24.1 (75.4)	19.4 (66.9)	14.0 (57.2)	8.2 (46.8)	16.5 (61.7)
Daily mean °C (°F)	3.4 (38.1)	3.8 (38.8)	6.5 (43.7)	10.7 (51.3)	15.2 (59.4)	19.2 (66.6)	22.9 (73.2)	24.7 (76.5)	21.3 (70.3)	16.9 (62.4)	11.5 (52.7)	5.9 (42.6)	13.5 (56.3)
Mean daily minimum °C (°F)	1.5 (34.7)	1.8 (35.2)	3.9 (39.0)	7.8 (46.0)	12.3 (54.1)	16.6 (61.9)	20.6 (69.1)	22.5 (72.5)	19.4 (66.9)	15.1 (59.2)	9.5 (49.1)	3.9 (39.0)	11.2 (52.2)
Record low °C (°F)	−8.7 (16.3)	−5.9 (21.4)	−3.9 (25.0)	0.6 (33.1)	6.3 (43.3)	11.1 (52.0)	15.6 (60.1)	17.5 (63.5)	14.8 (58.6)	4.6 (40.3)	−0.2 (31.6)	−4.8 (23.4)	−8.7 (16.3)
Average precipitation mm (inches)	23.0 (0.91)	32.8 (1.29)	50.8 (2.00)	88.8 (3.50)	96.7 (3.81)	157.5 (6.20)	208.1 (8.19)	211.2 (8.31)	120.5 (4.74)	58.7 (2.31)	46.1 (1.81)	33.1 (1.30)	1,127.3 (44.38)
Average precipitation days (≥ 0.1 mm)	9.2	7.5	7.8	8.9	8.2	9.5	12.5	11.5	9.4	6.6	8.1	10.7	109.9
Average snowy days	9.0	5.1	1.7	0.1	0.0	0.0	0.0	0.0	0.0	0.0	0.8	7.5	24.2
Average relative humidity (%)	69.3	71.1	73.3	77.3	81.2	88.3	92.9	89.3	84.4	75.2	71.5	68.9	78.6
Mean monthly sunshine hours	103.9	140.6	199.9	205.2	200.3	158.5	118.3	187.1	185.1	204.0	147.1	109.0	1,959
Percentage possible sunshine	30.7	44.9	50.3	51.4	44.1	35.6	26.0	45.2	48.4	58.1	47.7	35.2	42.9
Source: Korea Meteorological Administration (percent sunshine 1981–2010)

== Notable people from Sinan County ==
- Kim Dae-jung (Hangul: 김대중), Former president of South Korea (born in Hauido)
- Lee Sedol (Hangul: 이세돌), South Korean former professional Go player of 9 dan rank (born in Bigeumdo)
- Whanki Kim (Hangul: 김환기), South Korean pioneering abstract artist (born in Anjwado)
- Jinwoo (Real Name: Kim Jin-woo, Hangul: 김진우), singer, dancer, model, actor and K-pop idol, member of K-pop boygroup WINNER (born in Imjado)
- Cha Ryong (Hangul: 차룡), South Korean actor (born in Bigeumdo)

== Twin towns – sister cities ==
Sinan is twinned with:

- Gangnam-gu, South Korea
- Mapo-gu, South Korea
- Nowon-gu, South Korea
- Ongjin, South Korea
- Gyeongsan, South Korea
- Gunpo, South Korea
- Dawa, China

== See also ==
- Geography of South Korea
- Shinan ship
- Slavery on salt farms in Sinan County
