= Wando County =

County in Jeonnam-Gwangju, South Korea

Coordinates: 34°19′N 126°45′E

Wando
- County
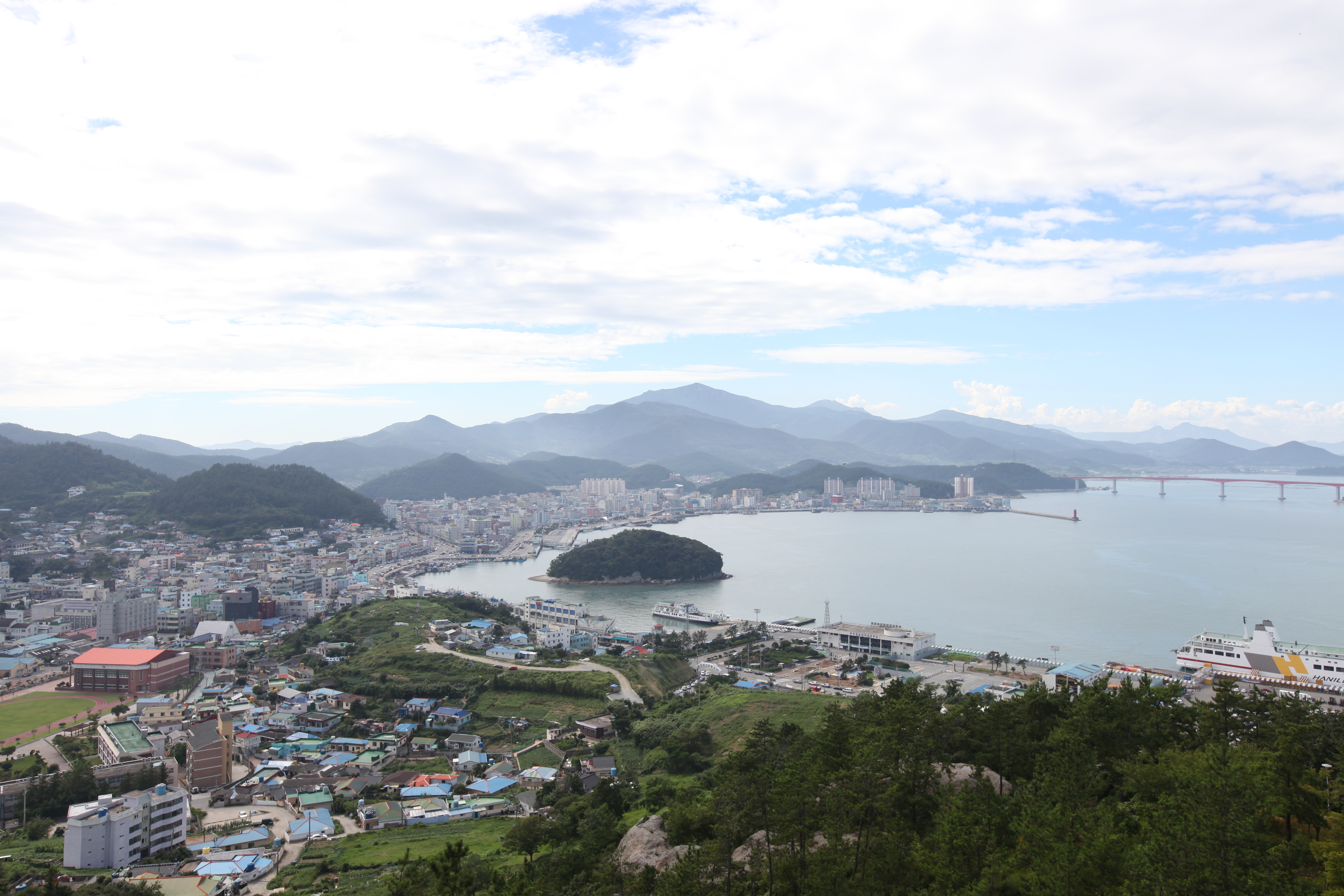
- Wando Port

- Flag Emblem of Wando

- Location in South Korea
- Country: South Korea
- Region: Honam
- Provincial-level city: Jeonnam-Gwangju
- Administrative divisions: 3 eup, 9 myeon

Area
  - Total: 391.81 km^{2} (151.28 sq mi)

Population (September 2024)
  - Total: 45,837
  - Density: 179/km^{2} (460/sq mi)
  - Dialect: Jeolla

Korean name
- Hangul: 완도군
- Hanja: 莞島郡
- RR: Wando-gun
- MR: Wando-gun

Wando County (Korean: 완도군) is a county in Jeonnam-Gwangju, South Korea. It takes its name from the island of Wando, which is the largest island within the county and serves as the county seat.

The major military headquarters and trading hub Cheonghaejin, established by General Chang Pogo in 828, was located on Wando Island.

Champion golfer K.J. Choi hails from Wando.

== Districts ==
Classification	Area (km^{2})	Units	Population
Wando-eup	54.11	8,089	19,761
Geumil-eup	28.14	1,945	4,033
Nohwa-eup	31.94	2,545	5,780
Gunwae-myun	42.78	1,889	3,732
Shinji-myun	31.31	1,822	3,874
Gogeum-myun	46.38	2,263	4,651
Yaksan-myun	28.80	1,28	2,586
Chungsan-myun	41.88	1,319	2,613
Soan-myun	28.37	1,4	3,021
Geumdang-myun	14.22	560	1,184
Bogil-myun	32.54	1,141	2,819
Saengil-myun	15.07	492	945
Total	395.54	24,745	54,999

== Speciality ==
The best Gim is produced in the Wando area. Laver farming goes back 200 years, and with 22%, Wando is the biggest production area. In 2006, Wando exported about 2.3 million tons of green laver to the United States, Japan, and Taiwan.

== Climate ==
Climate data for Wando (1991–2020 normals, extremes 1971–present)
Month	Jan	Feb	Mar	Apr	May	Jun	Jul	Aug	Sep	Oct	Nov	Dec	Year
Record high °C (°F)	19.5 (67.1)	20.0 (68.0)	23.0 (73.4)	27.6 (81.7)	31.9 (89.4)	31.9 (89.4)	36.2 (97.2)	37.0 (98.6)	35.7 (96.3)	30.5 (86.9)	24.4 (75.9)	20.3 (68.5)	37.0 (98.6)
Mean daily maximum °C (°F)	6.3 (43.3)	8.3 (46.9)	12.6 (54.7)	17.9 (64.2)	22.5 (72.5)	25.4 (77.7)	28.3 (82.9)	29.8 (85.6)	26.6 (79.9)	21.6 (70.9)	15.2 (59.4)	8.8 (47.8)	18.6 (65.5)
Daily mean °C (°F)	2.7 (36.9)	3.9 (39.0)	7.8 (46.0)	12.9 (55.2)	17.6 (63.7)	21.2 (70.2)	24.7 (76.5)	26.0 (78.8)	22.3 (72.1)	16.9 (62.4)	10.8 (51.4)	4.9 (40.8)	14.3 (57.7)
Mean daily minimum °C (°F)	−0.4 (31.3)	0.2 (32.4)	3.6 (38.5)	8.5 (47.3)	13.4 (56.1)	17.9 (64.2)	22.1 (71.8)	23.2 (73.8)	19.0 (66.2)	13.0 (55.4)	7.0 (44.6)	1.4 (34.5)	10.7 (51.3)
Record low °C (°F)	−10.2 (13.6)	−10.7 (12.7)	−6.9 (19.6)	−0.9 (30.4)	5.1 (41.2)	9.9 (49.8)	16.5 (61.7)	13.9 (57.0)	11.0 (51.8)	2.1 (35.8)	−2.9 (26.8)	−10.2 (13.6)	−10.7 (12.7)
Average precipitation mm (inches)	34.0 (1.34)	52.6 (2.07)	103.7 (4.08)	141.7 (5.58)	147.0 (5.79)	207.2 (8.16)	257.2 (10.13)	238.8 (9.40)	176.4 (6.94)	73.0 (2.87)	62.7 (2.47)	37.2 (1.46)	1,531.5 (60.30)
Average precipitation days (≥ 0.1 mm)	8.0	7.6	8.9	8.9	9.3	11.5	13.5	11.8	9.7	5.8	7.8	8.3	111.1
Average snowy days	7.2	4.6	1.5	0.0	0.0	0.0	0.0	0.0	0.0	0.0	0.4	4.8	18.5
Average relative humidity (%)	65.1	64.0	64.3	65.8	70.8	79.5	85.0	82.6	77.2	69.3	68.6	66.6	71.6
Mean monthly sunshine hours	149.0	161.6	189.6	203.7	214.3	162.3	150.4	175.5	167.6	206.5	162.0	149.9	2,092.4
Percentage possible sunshine	47.4	50.8	48.8	52.0	47.8	36.8	33.1	44.0	44.6	58.0	52.2	48.5	46.5
Source: Korea Meteorological Administration (snow and percent sunshine 1981–2010)

== Twin towns – sister cities ==
Wando is twinned with:

- Gangdong-gu, South Korea
- Nowon-gu, South Korea
- Yeonsu-gu, South Korea
- Cheonan, South Korea
- Huế, Vietnam
- Rongcheng, China

== See also ==
- Sinjido
- Saengildo
- Cheongsando - Cheongsando (Cheongsan island) is designated as a slow city.
