= Heuksando =

Coordinates: 34.6707°N 125.42°E

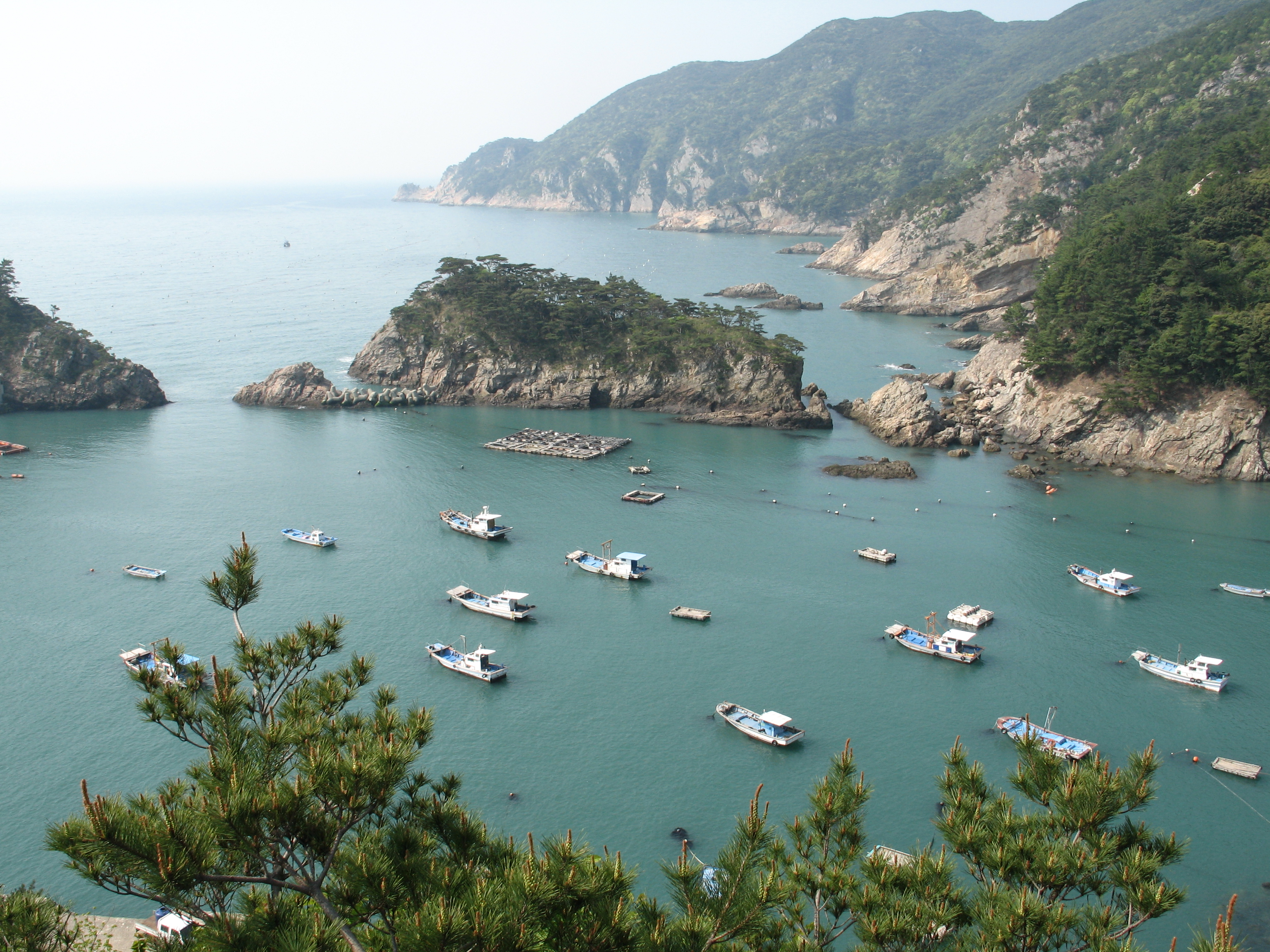
- Interactive map of Heuksando
- Country: South Korea

Area
  - Total: 19.7 km^{2} (7.6 sq mi)

Population (2001)
  - Total: 3,133
  - Density: 159/km^{2} (412/sq mi)

Korean name
- Hangul: 흑산도
- Hanja: 黑山島
- RR: Heuksando
- MR: Hŭksando

Heuksando (Korean: 흑산도) is an island in the Yellow Sea located off 97.2 km from the southwest coast of Mokpo, Jeollanam-do, South Korea. It covers an area of 19.7 km^{2} and consists of several peaks: Munamsan (문암산/門岩山 400m), Gitdaebong (깃대봉/깃대峰 378m), Seonyubong (선유봉/仙遊峰 300m), Sangnasan (상라산/象羅山 227m). It is within the administrative boundaries of Sinan County, Jeollanam-do, South Korea since 1969. The island's 19.7 km^{2} are home to about 3,133 people.

== Climate ==
Climate data for Heuksando, Sinan (1997–2020 normals, extremes 1997–present)
Month	Jan	Feb	Mar	Apr	May	Jun	Jul	Aug	Sep	Oct	Nov	Dec	Year
Record high °C (°F)	16.5 (61.7)	22.0 (71.6)	23.3 (73.9)	25.7 (78.3)	28.8 (83.8)	30.1 (86.2)	32.8 (91.0)	36.0 (96.8)	35.1 (95.2)	28.0 (82.4)	22.6 (72.7)	19.0 (66.2)	34.9 (94.8)
Mean daily maximum °C (°F)	5.5 (41.9)	6.5 (43.7)	9.9 (49.8)	14.5 (58.1)	19.1 (66.4)	22.8 (73.0)	25.9 (78.6)	27.9 (82.2)	24.1 (75.4)	19.4 (66.9)	14.0 (57.2)	8.2 (46.8)	16.5 (61.7)
Daily mean °C (°F)	3.4 (38.1)	3.8 (38.8)	6.5 (43.7)	10.7 (51.3)	15.2 (59.4)	19.2 (66.6)	22.9 (73.2)	24.7 (76.5)	21.3 (70.3)	16.9 (62.4)	11.5 (52.7)	5.9 (42.6)	13.5 (56.3)
Mean daily minimum °C (°F)	1.5 (34.7)	1.8 (35.2)	3.9 (39.0)	7.8 (46.0)	12.3 (54.1)	16.6 (61.9)	20.6 (69.1)	22.5 (72.5)	19.4 (66.9)	15.1 (59.2)	9.5 (49.1)	3.9 (39.0)	11.2 (52.2)
Record low °C (°F)	−8.7 (16.3)	−5.9 (21.4)	−3.9 (25.0)	0.6 (33.1)	6.3 (43.3)	11.1 (52.0)	15.6 (60.1)	17.5 (63.5)	14.8 (58.6)	4.6 (40.3)	−0.2 (31.6)	−4.8 (23.4)	−8.7 (16.3)
Average precipitation mm (inches)	23.0 (0.91)	32.8 (1.29)	50.8 (2.00)	88.8 (3.50)	96.7 (3.81)	157.5 (6.20)	208.1 (8.19)	211.2 (8.31)	120.5 (4.74)	58.7 (2.31)	46.1 (1.81)	33.1 (1.30)	1,127.3 (44.38)
Average precipitation days (≥ 0.1 mm)	9.2	7.5	7.8	8.9	8.2	9.5	12.5	11.5	9.4	6.6	8.1	10.7	109.9
Average snowy days	9.0	5.1	1.7	0.1	0.0	0.0	0.0	0.0	0.0	0.0	0.8	7.5	24.2
Average relative humidity (%)	69.3	71.1	73.3	77.3	81.2	88.3	92.9	89.3	84.4	75.2	71.5	68.9	78.6
Mean monthly sunshine hours	103.9	140.6	199.9	205.2	200.3	158.5	118.3	187.1	185.1	204.0	147.1	109.0	1,959
Percentage possible sunshine	30.7	44.9	50.3	51.4	44.1	35.6	26.0	45.2	48.4	58.1	47.7	35.2	42.9
Source: Korea Meteorological Administration (percent sunshine 1981–2010)all-time extreme temperature

== Gallery ==
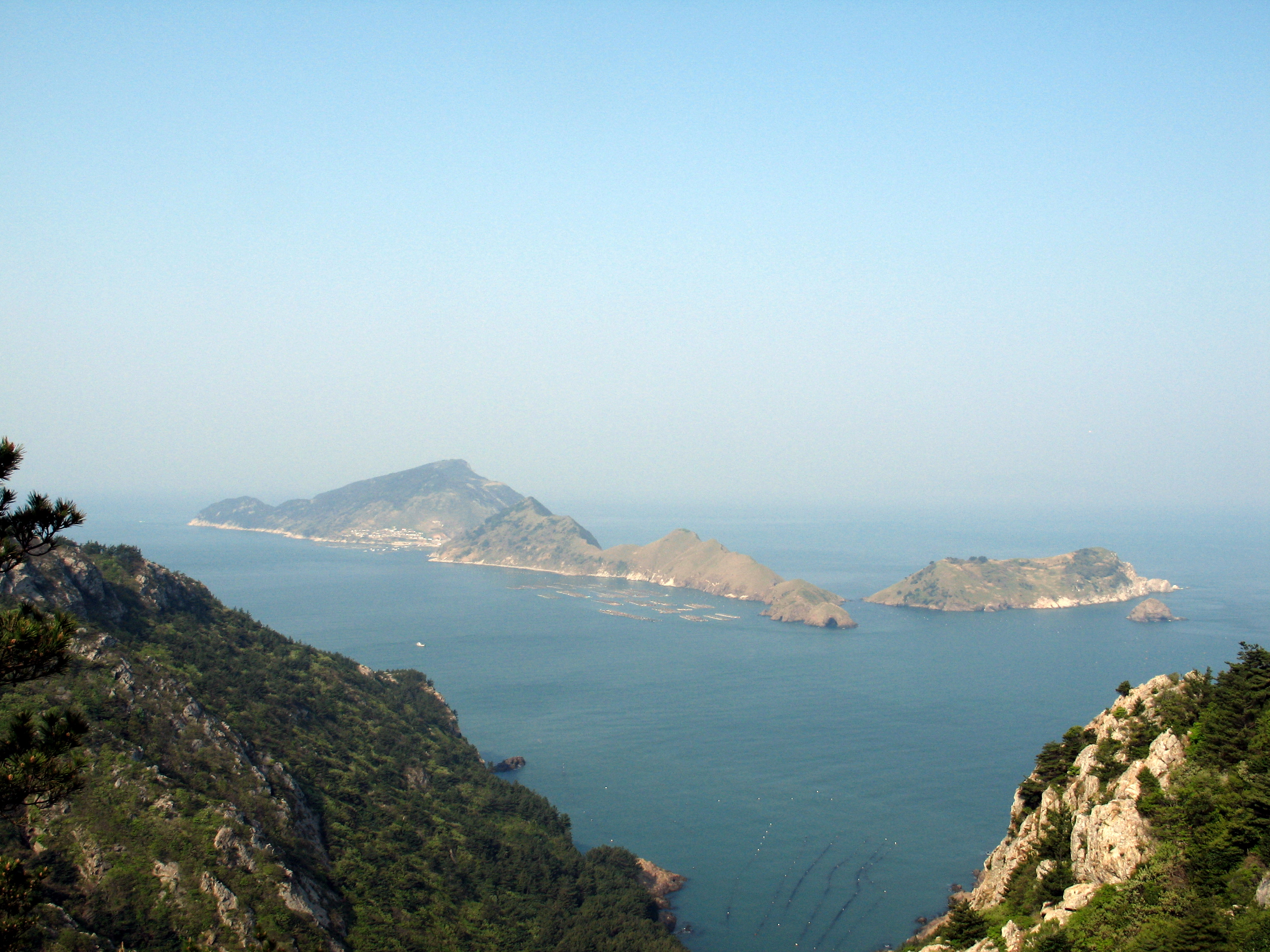

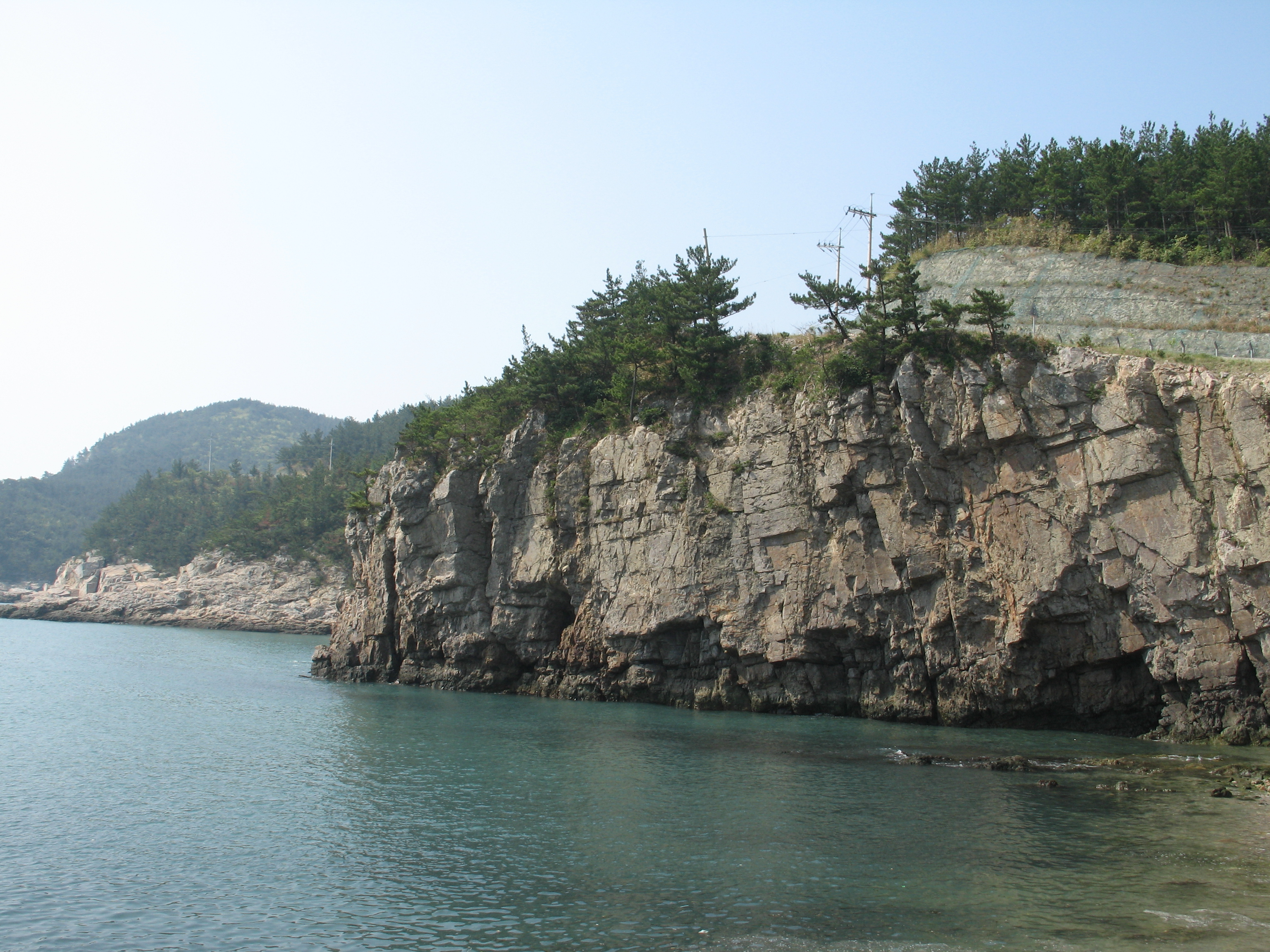

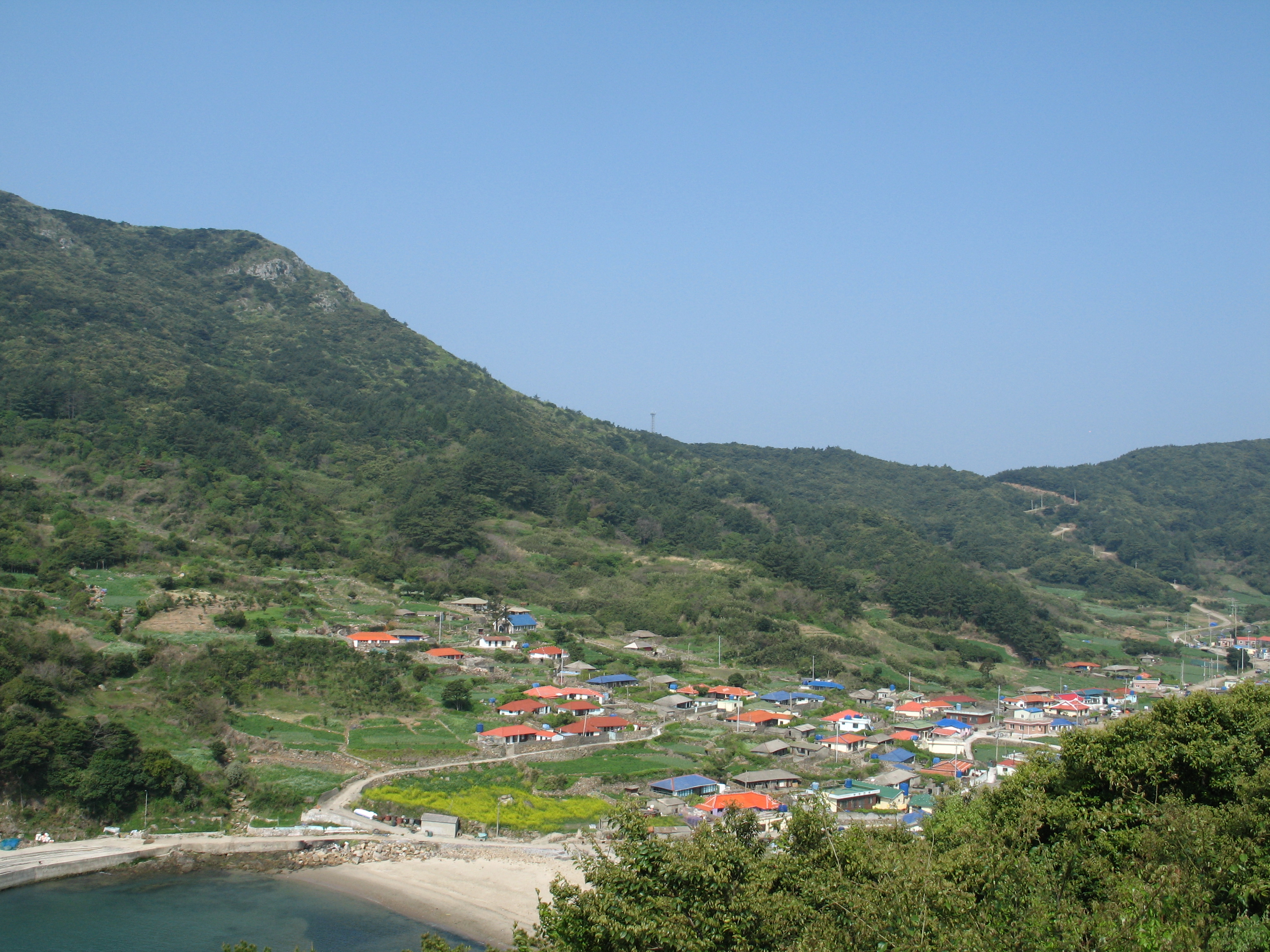

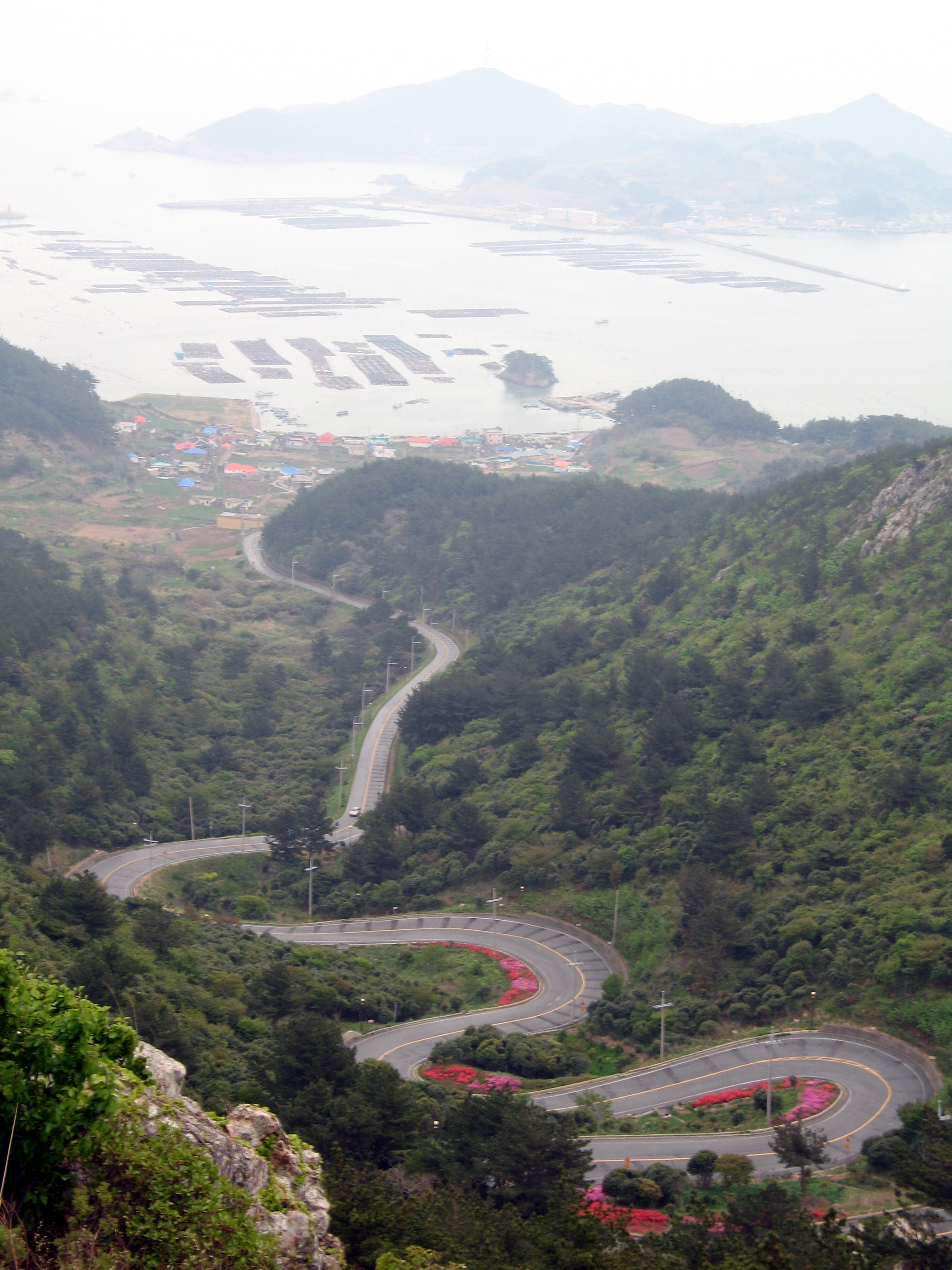

== See also ==
- Chang Pogo
- List of islands of South Korea
