= Anmado =

Island in South Korea

- Interactive map of Anmado

Geography
- Coordinates: 35°20′51″N 126°1′7″E

Korean name
- Hangul: 안마도
- Hanja: 鞍馬島
- Lit.: Saddled horse island
- RR: Anmado
- MR: Anmado

Anmado (Korean: 안마도) or Anma Island is an island off the coast of South Jeolla Province, South Korea.

== Toponymy ==
The name of the island possibly derives from an event where a coffin of a Chinese minister drifted onto the island that contained the statue of a saddled horse. The island's shape is also said to resemble that of a saddled horse.

== Description ==
Anmado covers an area of 6.09 km^{2}. By 2010, it had 184 residents: 109 male and 75 female. The landscape features several peaks: Dwitsan (177 m), Makbong (167 m), and Geonsan (145 m). Anmado is suited for agriculture, and many of its residents work as farmers. Its main agricultural products include rice, wheat, corn, garlic, bean, sesame, and pepper. There is currently one elementary school and middle school on the island.
