= Pine Tree of Seowon-ri, Boeun =

Historic tree in North Chungcheong, South Korea

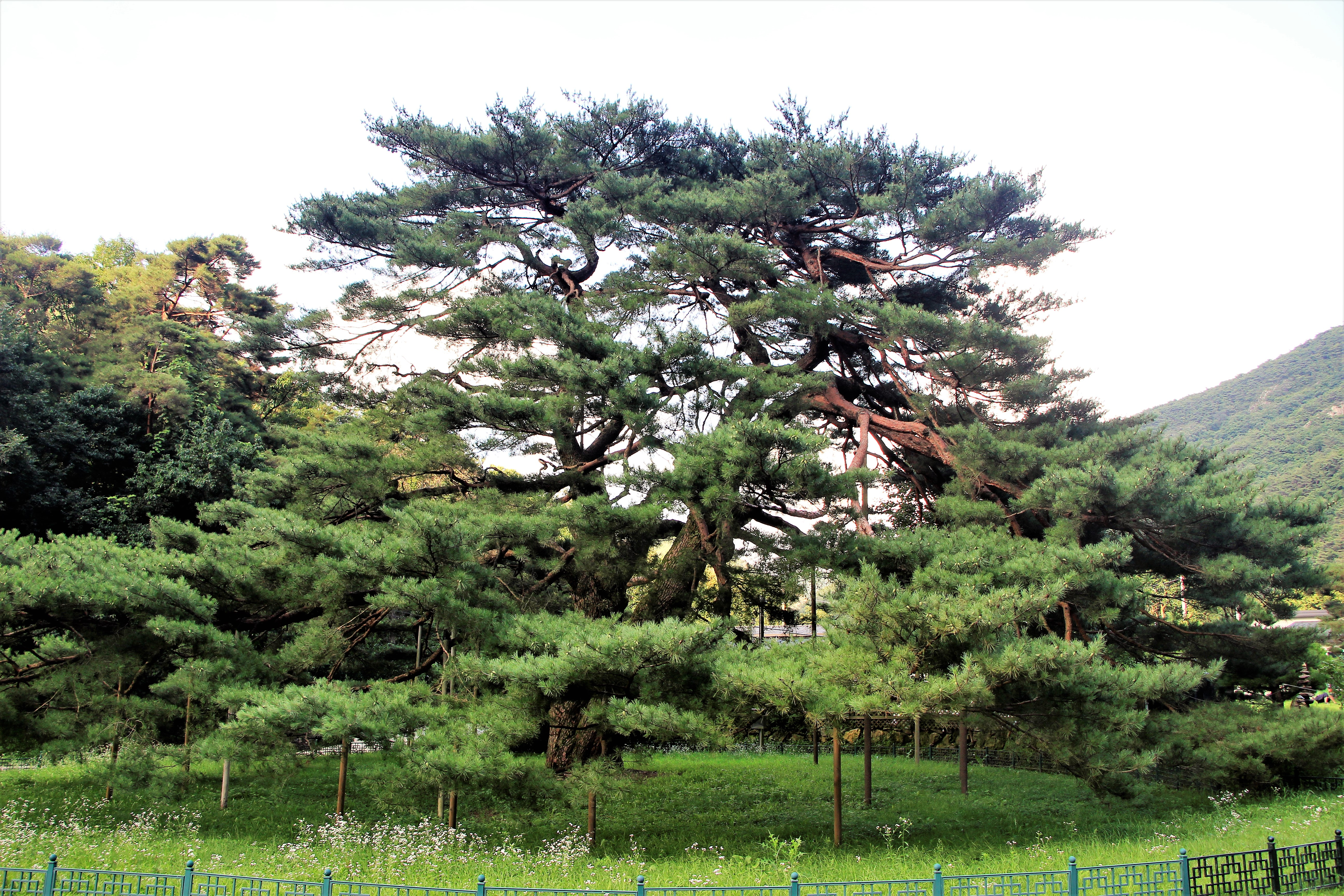
- The Boeun Seowon-ri tree
- Interactive map of Pine Tree of Seowon-ri, Boeun
- Native name: 정부인송; 貞夫人松 (Korean)
- Species: Pinus densiflora
- Location: Seowon-ri, Maro-myeon, Boeun County, Chungcheongbuk-do, South Korea
- Coordinates: 36°29′36.1″N 127°47′17.5″E
- Height: 15.2 metres (50 ft)
- Diameter: 1.5915 metres (5 ft 2.66 in)

In Seowon-ri, Boeun County, North Chungcheong Province, South Korea, there is an ancient Korean red pine (Pinus densiflora). On April 30, 1988, it was designated Natural Monument of South Korea No. 352. The tree is famously known by its nickname Jeongbuinsong (정부인송; 貞夫人松), which translates to "Government Wife Pine" or "Lady Minister Pine," due to its folkloric status as the wife of the nearby Jeongipumsong (Natural Monument No. 103), a tree legendarily granted a ministerial rank by King Sejo of Joseon dynasty.

== Description and local tradition ==
The Seowon-ri pine stands about 7 kilometres from Jeongipumsong. Both trees are thought to be around 600 years old. The Seowon-ri pine has a trunk measuring about 5 metres around its base. It divides into two about 84 centimetres above the ground, and its branches spread out like an umbrella. A 2025 report gives its height as 15.2 metres, while the National Heritage Administration lists it as 17 metres.

The tree is also called Jeongbuinsong (貞夫人松). During the Joseon dynasty, Jeongbuin (貞夫人) was a title given to the wives of second-rank officials. People compared Jeongipumsong's tall, straight trunk with the wide branches of the Seowon-ri pine and called the two trees husband and wife. Every year, villagers hold a ceremony at the Seowon-ri pine to pray for peace in the village.

The Seowon-ri pine was designated a Natural Monument on 30 April 1988.

== Wedding and pollination ==
In May 2001, Jeongipumsong took part in a traditional wedding ceremony with a pine tree from Samcheok. Some residents of Boeun were unhappy about the wedding because the Seowon-ri pine, known as Jeongbuinsong, was already regarded as Jeongipumsong's wife.

In 2002, the Chungcheongbuk-do Forest Environment Research Institute used pollen from Jeongipumsong to pollinate the Seowon-ri pine. Seeds were collected in 2003, and young trees were grown from 2004. One of these trees was planted at Gwangneung in April 2012, and another at the Blue House in April 2014.
