= 文山 =

文山 may refer to:

== China (Wénshān) ==
- Wenshan District, Taipei, Taiwan, Republic of China
- Wenshan Line, of the Taipei Rapid Transit System, Taiwan, Republic of China
- Wenshan Zhuang and Miao Autonomous Prefecture, Yunnan, People's Republic of China
  - Wenshan City, seat of the autonomous prefecture
  - Wenshan Airport, which serves the autonomous prefecture
- Wenshan Lake, at Shenzhen University, Guangdong, People's Republic of China
- Vincent Fang (lyricist) (方文山), lyricist

== Korea ==
- Munsan-myeon, a township in Seocheon-gun, Chungcheongnam-do, South Korea

== Japan ==
- Bunsan-gun (文山郡), Taihoku Prefecture, Japanese Empire
- Inbe no Fumiyama (斎部文山; 822–867), Heian era noble

== See also ==
- Wenshan (disambiguation)
