= List of valleys of Korea =

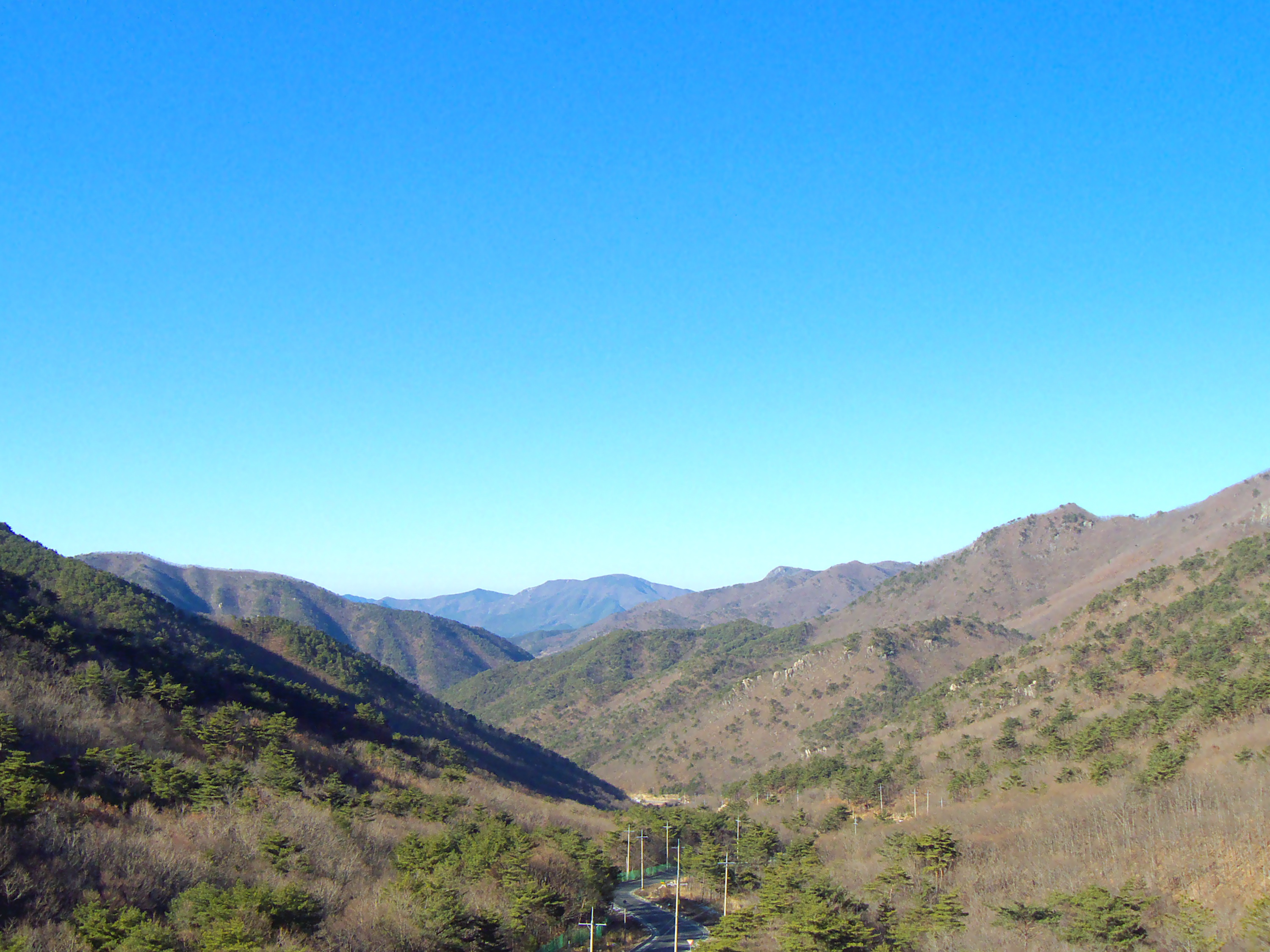
A view of Eden Valley, Yangsan, South Korea

This is a list of valleys in South Korea. A valley is a low area between hills, often with a river running through it. Some Korean valleys are similar to one-another in terms of their geographic features, although there is also significant variation in their formations. (Note: "These valleys have many features in common*. They cut mountain massives which are heterogeneous in structure. Thus there is an extraordinary variation of forms, with an almost ceaseless alternation of wild rugged gorges and densely ...")

== List of valleys of North Korea ==
In western North Korea, significant agricultural activity occurs in the narrow river valleys, which have a rich and fertile soil content.

Most of the prison camps in North Korea are located in "remote mountain valleys completely shut off from the outside world and escape is virtually impossible."

== List of valleys of South Korea ==
In South Korea, many valleys are surrounded by mountains with forests.

- Baekundong Valley

=== Seoul Special City ===
This is a list of valleys in Seoul Special City (Korean: 서울특별시; Hanja: ─特別市)

- Wooyidong Valley (Korean: 우이동계곡; Hanja: 牛耳洞溪谷)
- Baeksasil Valley (Korean: 백사실계곡; Hanja: 白沙室溪谷)
- Samchunsa Valley (Korean: 삼천사계곡; Hanja: 三千寺溪谷)
- Jinkwansa Valley (Korean: 진관사계곡; Hanja: 津寬寺溪谷)
- Pyeongchang Valley (Korean: 평창계곡; Hanja: 平昌溪谷)

=== Incheon Metropolitan City ===
This is a list of valleys in Incheon Metropolitan City (Korean: 인천광역시; Hanja: 仁川廣域市)

- Hamhuhdongchun (Korean: 함허동천; Hanja: 涵虛洞天)

=== Busan Metropolitan City ===
This is a list of valleys in Busan Metropolitan City (Korean: 부산광역시; Hanja: 釜山廣域市)

- Busan – the most densely built up areas of the city are situated in a number of narrow valleys between the Nakdong River and the Suyeong River, with mountains separating most of the districts.
- Jangansa Valley (Korean: 장안사계곡; Hanja: 長安寺溪谷)
- Daechunchun Valley (Korean: 대천천계곡; Hanja: 大川川溪谷)

=== Ulsan Metropolitan City ===
This is a list of valleys in Ulsan Metropolitan City (Korean: 울산광역시; Hanja: 蔚山廣域市)

- Jakchunjung Valley (Korean: 작천정계곡(작괘천); Hanja: 酌掛川)
- Suknamsa Valley (Korean: 석남사계곡; Hanja: 石南寺溪谷)
- Cheonjeonri Gaksuk Valley (Korean: 천전리각석계곡; Hanja: 川前里角石溪谷)
- Naewonam Valley (Korean: 내원암계곡; Hanja: 內院庵溪谷)

=== Gyeonggi-do ===
This is a list of valleys in Gyeonggi-do (Korean: 경기도; Hanja: 京畿道)

- Baekun Valley (Korean: 백운계곡; Hanja: 白雲溪谷)
- Songchu Valley (Korean: 송추계곡; Hanja: 松楸溪谷)
- Myungji Valley (Korean: 명지계곡; Hanja: 明智溪谷)
- Youngchu Valley (Korean: 용추계곡; Hanja: 龍墜溪谷)
- Eurbi Valley (Korean: 어비계곡; Hanja: 魚飛溪谷)
- Gogiri Valley (Korean: 고기리계곡; Hanja: 高基里溪谷)
- Jungwon Valley (Korean: 중원계곡; Hanja: 中元溪谷)
- Bigum Valley (Korean: 비금계곡; Hanja: 秘琴溪谷)
- Sammaksa Valley (Korean: 삼막사계곡; Hanja: 三幕寺溪谷)
- Sanasa Valley (Korean: 사나사계곡; Hanja: 舍那寺溪谷)
- Dongmak Valley (Korean: 동막계곡; Hanja: 東幕溪谷)
- Byukgae Valley (Korean: 벽계구곡; Hanja: 蘗溪九曲)
- Jijang Valley (Korean: 지장계곡; Hanja: 地藏溪谷)
- Tapdong Valley (Korean: 탑동계곡; Hanja: 塔洞溪谷)
- Myojuksa Valley (Korean: 묘적사계곡; Hanja: 妙寂寺溪谷)
- Sudonggukmin Gwangwangji (Korean: 수동국민관광지; Hanja: 水洞國民觀光地)

=== Gangwon-do ===
This is a list of valleys in Gangwon-do (Korean: 강원도; Hanja: 江原道):

- Heungjung Valley (Korean: 흥정계곡; Hanja: 興亭溪谷)
- Murung Valley (Korean: 무릉계곡; Hanja: 武陵溪谷)
- Sogeumgang Valley (Korean: 소금강계곡; Hanja: 小金剛溪谷)
- Deokpung Valley (Korean: 덕풍계곡; Hanja: 悳豊溪谷)
- Kimsatgat Valley (Korean: 김삿갓계곡; Hanja: 金─溪谷)
- Geumdang Valley (Korean: 금당계곡; Hanja: 金堂溪谷)
- Yongso Valley (Korean: 용소계곡; Hanja: 龍沼溪谷)
- Bupheung Valley (Korean: 법흥계곡; Hanja: 法興溪谷)
- Jindong Valley (Korean: 진동계곡; Hanja: 鎭東溪谷)
- Misan Valley (Korean: 미산계곡; Hanja: 美山溪谷)
- Duksanki Valley (Korean: 덕산기계곡; Hanja: 德山基溪谷)
- Dutayeon Valley (Korean: 두타연계곡; Hanja: 頭陀淵溪谷)
- Damtuh Valley (Korean: 담터계곡; Hanja: ─溪谷)
- Beobsuchi Valley (Korean: 법수치계곡; Hanja: 法水峙溪谷)
- Chunbuldong Valley (Korean: 천불동계곡; Hanja: 千佛洞溪谷)
- Gwangduk Valley (Korean: 광덕계곡; Hanja: 廣德溪谷)
- Yongsugol Valley (Korean: 용수골계곡; Hanja: 龙水谷溪谷)
- Sutasa Valley (Korean: 수타사계곡; Hanja: 壽陀寺溪谷)
- Achimgari Valley (Korean: 아침가리계곡)
- Shindae Valley (Korean: 신대계곡; Hanja: 新垈溪谷)
- Sundam Valley (Korean: 순담계곡; Hanja: 蓴潭溪谷)
- Makdong Valley (Korean: 막동계곡; Hanja: 幕洞溪谷)
- Jujungol Valley (Korean: 주전골계곡; Hanja: 鑄錢─溪谷)
- Misiryeong Valley (Korean: 미시령계곡; Hanja: 彌矢嶺溪谷)
- Naerinchun Valley (Korean: 내린천계곡; Hanja: 內麟川溪谷)
- Eorayeon Valley (Korean: 어라연계곡; Hanja: 魚羅淵溪谷)
- Dankyunggol Valley (Korean: 단경골계곡; Hanja: 壇京─溪谷)
- Eoseongjeon Valley (Korean: 어성전계곡; Hanja: 魚城田溪谷)
- Bangdong Valley (Korean: 방동계곡; Hanja: 芳東溪谷)
- Gwangdaegok (Korean: 광대곡; Hanja: 廣大谷)
- Suryumdong Valley (Korean: 수렴동계곡; Hanja: 水簾洞溪谷)
- Sugam Valley (Korean: 숙암계곡; Hanja: 宿巖溪谷)
- Jangjun Valley (Korean: 장전계곡; Hanja: 長田溪谷)
- Chuneunsa Valley (Korean: 천은사계곡; Hanja: 天恩寺溪谷)
- Naeri Valley (Korean: 내리계곡; Hanja: 內里溪谷)
- Seobong Valley (Korean: 서봉계곡; Hanja: 西峯溪谷)
- Namjeon Valley (Korean: 남전계곡; Hanja: 藍田溪谷)
- Naewun Valley (Korean: 뇌운계곡; Hanja: 雷雲溪谷)
- Dunjeon Valley (Korean: 둔전계곡; Hanja: 屯田溪谷)
- Chudae Valley (Korean: 추대계곡; Hanja: 推戴溪谷)
- Gumandong Valley (Korean: 구만동계곡; Hanja: 九萬洞溪谷)
- Jinburyung Valley (Korean: 진부령계곡; Hanja: 陳富嶺溪谷)
- Gayadong Valley (Korean: 가야동계곡; Hanja: 伽倻洞溪谷)
- Yongdam Valley (Korean: 용담계곡; Hanja: 龍潭溪谷)
- Chunmi Valley (Korean: 천미계곡; Hanja: 天尾溪谷)
- Haenggudong Valley (Korean: 행구동계곡; Hanja: 杏邱洞溪谷)
- Suhang Valley (Korean: 수항계곡; Hanja: 水項溪谷)
- Jungbong Valley (Korean: 중봉계곡; Hanja: 中峰渓谷)
- Samil Valley (Korean: 삼일계곡; Hanja: 三逸溪谷)
- Danggol Valley (Korean: 당골계곡; Hanja: 堂─溪谷)
- Michungol Valley (Korean: 미천골계곡; Hanja: 米川─溪谷)
- Hachuri Valley (Korean: 하추리계곡; Hanja: 下秋里溪谷)
- Eomdun Valley (Korean: 엄둔계곡)
- Bisugumi Valley (Korean: 비수구미계곡; Hanja: 飛水口尾溪谷)
- Chungpyungsa Valley (Korean: 청평사계곡; Hanja: 淸平寺溪谷)
- Byungjibang Valley (Korean: 청평사계곡; Hanja: 兵之方溪谷)
- Mansandong Valley (Korean: 만산동계곡; Hanja: 萬山洞溪谷)
- Gowontong Valley (Korean: 고원통계곡; Hanja: 古元通溪谷)
- Gwangchi Valley (Korean: 광치계곡; Hanja: 光州溪谷)
- Baekdam Valley (Korean: 백담계곡; Hanja: 百潭溪谷)
- Donghwal Valley (Korean: 동활계곡; Hanja: 東活溪谷)
- Saldun Valley (Korean: 살둔계곡; Hanja: ─屯溪谷)
- Naepyeong Valley (Korean: 내평계곡; Hanja: 內坪溪谷)
- Jiam Valley (Korean: 지암계곡; Hanja: 芝巖溪谷)
- Gongsujeon Valley (Korean: 공수전계곡; Hanja: 公須田溪谷)
- Geumdae Valley (Korean: 금대계곡; Hanja: 金垈溪谷)

=== Chungcheongbuk-do ===
This is a list of valleys in Chungcheongbuk-do (Korean: 충청북도; Hanja: 忠淸北道)

- Songgae Valley (Korean: 송계계곡; Hanja: 松界溪谷)
- Ssanggok Valley (Korean: 쌍곡계곡; Hanja: 雙谷溪谷)
- Mulhan Valley (Korean: 물한계곡; Hanja: 勿閑溪谷)
- Dukdong Valley (Korean: 덕동계곡; Hanja: 德洞溪谷)
- Hwayang Valley (Korean: 화양계곡; Hanja: 華陽溪谷)
- Mansu Valley (Korean: 만수계곡; Hanja: 萬壽溪谷)
- Namchun Valley (Korean: 남천계곡; Hanja: 南川溪谷)
- Seowon Valley (Korean: 서원계곡; Hanja: 書院溪谷)
- Gallon Valley (Korean: 갈론계곡; Hanja: 葛隠渓谷)
- Darian Valley (Korean: 다리안계곡; Hanja: 桥内溪谷)
- Yeongok Valley (Korean: 연곡계곡; Hanja: 輦轂溪谷)
- Saebat Valley (Korean: 새밭계곡; Hanja: 乙田溪谷)
- Sunyoodong Valley (Korean: 선유동계곡; Hanja: 仙遊洞溪谷)
- Yongha Valley (Korean: 용하구곡; Hanja: 用夏九曲)
- Neunggang Valley (Korean: 능강계곡; Hanja: 綾江溪谷)
- Sunam Valley (Korean: 선암계곡; Hanja: 仙岩溪谷)

=== Chungcheongnam-do ===
This is a list of valleys in Chungcheongbnam-do (Korean: 충청남도; Hanja: 忠淸南道)

- Surak Valley (Korean: 수락계곡; Hanja: 水落溪谷)
- Yonghyun Valley (Korean: 용현계곡; Hanja: 龍賢溪谷)
- Surak Valley (Korean: 수락계곡; Hanja: 水落溪谷)
- Gangdanggol Valley (Korean: 강당골계곡; Hanja: 講堂溪谷)
- Sungjoo Valley (Korean: 성주계곡; Hanja: 星州溪谷)
- Donghaksa Valley (Korean: 동학사계곡; Hanja: 東鶴寺溪谷)
- Nengchun Valley (Korean: 냉천계곡; Hanja: 冷泉溪谷)
- Jichun Valley (Korean: 지천계곡; Hanja: 之川溪谷)
- Gapsa Valley (Korean: 갑사계곡; Hanja: 甲寺溪谷)
- Dorim Valley (Korean: 도림계곡; Hanja: 道林溪谷)
- Shimyeondong Valley (Korean: 심연동계곡; Hanja: 深淵洞溪谷)
- Myungdae Valley (Korean: 명대골계곡; Hanja: 名垈溪谷)
- Hwajanggol Valley (Korean: 화장골계곡)
- Jakchun Valley (Korean: 작천계곡; Hanja: 鵲泉溪谷)
- Sansuri Valley (Korean: 산수리계곡; Hanja: 山水里溪谷)

=== Gyeongsangbuk-do ===
This is a list of valleys in Gyeongsangbuk-do (Korean: 경상북도; Hanja: 慶尙北道)

- Pochun Valley (Korean: 포천계곡; Hanja: 布川溪谷)
- Ockgae Valley (Korean: 옥계계곡; Hanja: 玉溪溪谷)
- Yongchu Valley (Korean: 용추계곡; Hanja: 龍墜溪谷)
- Chisan Valley (Korean: 치산계곡; Hanja: 稚山溪谷)
- Hawok Valley (Korean: 하옥계곡; Hanja: 瑕玉溪谷)
- Chungsong Eoreumgol Valley (Korean: 청송얼음골계곡; Hanja: 靑松冰谷溪谷)
- Dongsan Valley (Korean: 동산계곡; Hanja: 東山溪谷)
- Namsan Valley (Korean: 남산계곡; Hanja: 南山溪谷)
- Gumhwa Valley (Korean: 금화계곡; Hanja: 金華溪谷)
- Samgaeri Valley (Korean: 삼계리계곡; Hanja: 三溪里溪谷)
- Sunyoodong Valley (Korean: 선유동계곡; Hanja: 仙遊洞溪谷)
- Bulyoung Valley (Korean: 불영계곡; Hanja: 佛影溪谷)
- Yangpichun Valley (Korean: 왕피천계곡; Hanja: 王避川溪谷)
- Shinsung Valley (Korean: 신성계곡; Hanja: 薪城溪谷)
- Ssangyong Valley (Korean: 쌍용계곡; Hanja: 雙龍溪谷)
- Daegachun Valley (Korean: 대가천계곡; Hanja: 大家川溪谷)
- Sogwangri Valley (Korean: 소광리계곡; Hanja: 召光里溪谷)
- Banya Valley (Korean: 반야계곡; Hanja: 半夜溪谷)
- Binggae Valley (Korean: 빙계계곡; Hanja: 氷溪溪谷)
- Baeksuktan Valley (Korean: 백석탄계곡; Hanja: 白石灘溪谷)
- Hebang Valley (Korean: 희방계곡; Hanja: 喜方溪谷)
- Sukchun Valley (Korean: 석천계곡; Hanja: 石泉溪谷)
- Samijung Valley (Korean: 사미정계곡; Hanja: 四未亭溪谷)
- Suha Valley (Korean: 수하계곡; Hanja: 水下溪谷)
- Julgol Valley (Korean: 절골계곡; Hanja: 节谷溪谷)
- Baekchun Valley (Korean: 백천계곡; Hanja: 白泉溪谷)
- Bonshin Valley (Korean: 본신계곡; Hanja: 本新溪谷)
- Gosun Valley (Korean: 고선계곡; Hanja: 古善溪谷)
- Jukgae Valley (Korean: 죽계구곡; Hanja: 竹溪九曲)
- Dukgu Valley (Korean: 덕구계곡; Hanja: 德邱溪谷)
- Jubang Valley (Korean: 주방계곡; Hanja: 廚房溪谷)
- Sangbiri Valley (Korean: 상비리계곡; Hanja: 象鼻里溪谷)
- Saejae Valley (Korean: 새재계곡; Hanja: 鳥嶺溪谷)
- Eundal Valley (Korean: 운달계곡; Hanja: 雲達溪谷)

=== Gyeongsangnam-do ===
This is a list of valleys in Gyeongsangnam-do (Korean: 경상남도; Hanja: 慶尙南道)

=== Jeollabuk-do ===
This is a list of valleys in Jeollabuk-do (Korean: 전라북도; Hanja: 全羅北道)

=== Jeollanam-do ===
This is a list of valleys in Jeollabnam-do (Korean: 전라남도; Hanja: 全羅南道)

=== Jeju Special Self-Governing Province ===
This is a list of valleys in Jeju Special Self-Governing Province(Korean: 제주특별자치도; Hanja: 濟州特別自治道):

- Andeok Valley

== Unsorted ==
- South Valley Hamlet (Kongnam-ni)
