= Natural Monuments (South Korea) =

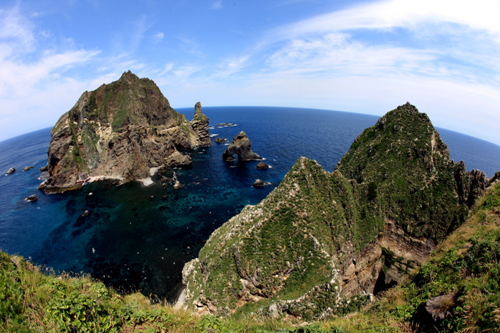
- The Liancourt Rocks, natural monument No. 336.

Korean name
- Hangul: 천연기념물
- Hanja: 天然紀念物
- RR: Cheonyeonginyeommul
- MR: Ch'ŏnyŏn'ginyŏmmul

Natural Monuments (Korean: 천연기념물) is a national-level designation within the heritage preservation system of South Korea for animals, plants, landforms, geological formations, and nature reserves. It is administered by the Cultural Heritage Administration according to the Natural Heritage Protection Law (문화재보호법).

As of August 2022, a total of 702 items have received this designation. Of them, 132 are scenic sites and 570 are natural monuments. Only 472 of these continue to maintain their natural monument designation, and only 129 maintained their scenic site designation.

== History ==
During the period of Japanese occupation, the Japanese authorities legislated the "Rules to conserve artefacts and historic sites (고적및유물보존규칙)" in July 1916, and a law called The Act of Conserving the Historic Sites, Natural Monuments, Scenic Sites and Treasures of Korea (조선보물고적명승천연기념물보존령) was published in August 1933. After the liberation of Korea, the South Korean government legislated the Natural Heritage Protection Law in 1962.

== List ==
This is a partial list of the natural monuments of South Korea.

=== 1–50 ===
Numbers 2 to 7, 10, 12, 14 to 17, 20 to 26, 31 to 34, 37, and 41 to 47 were delisted due to these monuments being destroyed, deemed of lost value of preservation or located in unrestored regions of South Korea (now occupied by North Korea, which are matters South Korea deals in the Committee for the Five Northern Korean Provinces).

#	Name	Location	Description	Refs
1	Forest of Oriental Arborvitae in Dodong, Daegu (대구 도동 측백나무 숲)	Do-dong, Dong-gu, Daegu	A 35,603 m^{2} (383,230 sq ft) forest of oriental arborvitae on the north slope of Mount Hyangsan. Previously thought to grow only in China, this area was determined in the early 1900s to be the southern boundary of the species. It was recorded by Seo Geojeong (1420–1488) in the Joseon dynasty as one of "Ten Sceneries of Dalseong" and called the "Northern Wall Fragrant Forest" (北壁香林).	
8	Lacebark Pine of Jae-dong in Seoul (서울 재동 백송)	Jae-dong, Jongno-gu, Seoul	A lacebark pine on the grounds of the Constitutional Court of Korea. The trunk branches off into two sections that rise to a height of 15 m (49 ft), but needs to be held up with supports to prevent the tree from falling over. Said to have been brought by an envoy from China, the tree is estimated to be about 600 years old, the oldest of this species in the country.	
9	Lacebark Pine of Susong-dong in Seoul (서울 조계사 백송)	Susong-dong, Jongno-gu, Seoul	A lacebark pine at the Buddhist temple of Jogyesa. It reaches a height of 10 m (33 ft) but its proximity to the main hall and the lack of growing space has weakened its condition. The tree is estimated to be about 500 years old and said to have been brought by an envoy from China, for which it is also called "The Pine of Tang" (唐松).	
11	Habitat of the White-bellied Black Woodpecker in Gwangneung (광릉 크낙새 서식지)	Bupyeong-ri, Jinjeon-eup, Namyangju, Gyeonggi-do	A 3,076,264 m^{2} (33,112,630 sq ft) habitat of the white-bellied black woodpecker stretching across the cities of Pocheon and Namyangju. The planting of pine and fir in the forest surrounding King Sejo and Queen Jeonghui's tombs during the Joseon dynasty provided a good habitat for the species; the area was strictly protected for nearly 500 years. Rare to the point of near-extinction, the bird has not been observed in the Gwangneung area since 1989.	
13	Breeding Ground of Herons in Jincheon (진천 노원리 왜가리 번식지)	Nowon-ri, Iwol-myeon, Jincheon, Chungcheongbuk-do	A 68,968 m^{2} (742,370 sq ft) heronry of grey and white herons near the village of Nowon-ri. Originally, the birds bred on a ginkgo tree estimated to be about 750 years old on the grounds of a private home; they have since moved on to the trees of the surrounding area. The local waters of the heronry include rice paddies, Miho-cheon, and its tributaries.	
18	Natural Habitat of Spleenwort of Sam-do (제주 삼도 파초일엽 자생지)	Bomok-dong, Seogwipo, Jeju-do	Spleenwort ferns on the cliffs of Sam-do. The island is this sub-tropical species' northern boundary and its only natural habitat in South Korea. The approximately 150 specimens have broad leaves up to 1 m (3.3 ft) in length. Transplantation was used to stabilize the species after over-picking nearly wiped it out, although genetic testing has raised doubts as to the indigenousness of about half the ferns.	
19	Natural Habitat of Crinum Lily in Gujwa-eup (제주 토끼섬 문주란 자생지)	Hado-ri, Gujwa-eup, Jeju City, Jeju-do	Crinum lilies on the island of Nan-do. This is the northern boundary of this subtropical species and its only natural habitat in South Korea. Its seeds were likely carried to the island by the ocean current. Surrounded by rocks and covered in sand, Nan-do is a very suitable habitat for this species, whose white flowers bloom from July to September. The plant was nearly wiped out by over-picking but replanting and active protection has since seen it flourish.	
27	Habitat of Eels in Jeju-do (제주 무태장어 서식지)	Cheonjiyeon Waterfall and Saekdal-dong, Seogwipo, Jeju-do	A 300,070 m^{2} (3,229,900 sq ft) habitat of marbled eel in Seogwipo. The area is the northern limit of this tropical species, which can only be spotted sporadically. Their spawning grounds are presumed to be in Taiwan, Okinawa, or perhaps even China and the Philippines, subsequently distributing into Korea by way of the ocean current. The inflow of pollutants is anticipated to have a negative effect on the habitat.	
28	Evergreen Forest of Judo Island (완도 주도 상록수림)	Judo, Wando-eup, Wando, Jeollanam-do	A 17,355 m^{2} (186,810 sq ft) subtropical forest on the island of Judo. Although small in size, the island's virgin forest is home to hundreds of varieties of trees making it valuable for academic research. Since the tree line meets the water, the forest also provides an ideal shelter for the fish of the surrounding waters. Its excellent state of preservation is likely due to the presence of an animist shrine at the island's highest point, for which the island has traditionally been considered hallowed ground.	
29	Evergreen Forest at Mijo-ri (남해 미조리 상록수림)	Mijo-ri, Samdong-myeon, Namhae, Gyeongsangnam-do	A 3,441 m^{2} (37,040 sq ft) forest on the east coast of Namhae County. It serves as a windbreak in winter for the nearby village of Mijo-ri and a shelter for the fish of the surrounding waters. It is home to a large variety of trees, including species common to the area such as silver magnolia, Japanese cinnamomum, and mochi trees, while its ground is covered in ardisia shrubs, mondo grass and holly leaf ferns. The forest is venerated by local residents who believe that as long as the forest flourishes, the village will produce people of great merit.	
30	Ginkgo Tree of Yongmunsa Temple (양평 용문사 은행나무)	Yongmun-myeon, Yangpyeong, Gyeonggi-do	A ginkgo tree at the Buddhist temple of Yongmunsa. The moss covered trunk branches off into three sections and reaches a height of about 41 m (135 ft). The tree is estimated to be about 1100 years old, said to have been planted by the final crown prince of Silla in despair over the ruin of his kingdom.	
35	Pseudo-hackberry in Daegu-myeon (강진 사당리 푸조나무)	Sadang-ri, Daegu-myeon, Gangjin, Jeollanam-do	A pseudo-hackberry tree in a field near the village of Sadang-ri. After part of the trunk died, seven branches spouted from the top and grew to a height of 16 m (52 ft). Estimated to be about 300 years old, it is said to have sprouted from the seeds of a branch broken off in a windstorm. The tree was first registered as a natural monument in 1937 by the Japanese government general.	
36	Asian Fringe Tree of Ssangam-myeon (순천 평중리 이팝나무)	Ssangam-myeon, Suncheon, Jeollanam-do	An Asian fringe tree atop a hill near the village of Pyeongjung-ri. Near the ground the trunk splits into two and rises to a height of 13.64 m (44.8 ft). The tree is in a poor state of health, with many of the upper branches beginning to wither and its leaves generally smaller than normal. Estimated to be about 400 years old, its blooming flowers are said to predict a good harvest.	
38	Higna Cherry Tree of Hwaeomsa Temple (구례 화엄사 올벚나무)	Gurye, Jeollanam-do	A higna cherry tree at Jijangam, a hermitage of the Buddhist temple of Hwaeomsa. Its two trunks rise to a height of 12 m (39 ft). The tree was heavily damaged by wind in 1945 and today its condition is poor, with many withering branches in the crown. It is estimated to be about 300 years old, the oldest of this species in the country, and said to have been planted by the monk Byeogam Gakseong (1575–1660) in the Joseon dynasty.	
39	Torreya Tree of Byeongyeong-myeon (강진 삼인리 비자나무)	Samin-ri, Byeongyeong-myeon, Gangjin, Jeollanam-do	A torreya tree on the south slope of Mount Naejangsan. Compared to its modest height of 10 m (33 ft), the crown is wide and has long branches. The area below has been reinforced with stone retaining walls, but the remaining root space is now very small. Estimated to be about 500 years old, the area surrounding the tree was home to an army garrison established by King Taejong (r. 1400–1418) that was in existence until 1894.	
40	Evergreen Forest at Yesong-ri (완도 예송리 상록수림)	Yesong-ri, Bogil-myeon, Wando, Jeollanam-do	A 58,486 m^{2} (629,540 sq ft) forest on the south-east coast of Bogil-do. Planted about 300 years ago as a windbreak against typhoons, it stretches for about 740 m (2,430 ft) along the beach. The forest is home to a wide variety of trees, including blacks pines as well as thick oleasters that twist and wind around the other trees. A one-hundred-year-old black pine within the forest is venerated by residents of Yesong-ri as a guardian deity, for which a ceremony is held every December to wish for the peace and security of the village.	
48	Natural Growth of Chinese Juniper in Tonggumi (울릉 통구미 향나무 자생지)	Namnyang-ri, Seo-myeon, Ulleung County, Gyeongsangbuk-do	A 24,132 m^{2} (259,750 sq ft) habitat of Chinese juniper on Tonggumi, a cliff near the village of Namnyang-ri, Ulleung-do. The trees have largely grown out of the rock crevices in isolation from other species, sharing particular genetic traits unique to this area and making them valuable for research. They have grown twisted along the rock face due to the strong sea winds. An early description of the habitat is found in the Annals of the Joseon Dynasty after a patrol of soldiers was forced ashore by a storm in 1724.	
49	Natural Growth of Chinese Juniper in Daepunggam (울릉 대풍감 향나무 자생지)	Taeha-ri, Seo-myeon, Ulleung County, Gyeongsangbuk-do	A 119,005 m^{2} (1,280,960 sq ft) habitat of Chinese juniper on Daepunggam, a cliff near the village of Taeha-ri, Ulleung-do. Although once plentiful to this area, the species is now found only above the cliffs where the strong sea winds have prevented the trees from growing to their full height. The difficult terrain ensures that the trees grow in isolation from other species, while protecting them from human encroachment. An early description of the habitat is found in the Annals of the Joseon Dynasty after a patrol of soldiers was forced ashore by a storm in 1724.	
50	Hemlock, Pine and Beech Trees in Taeha-dong (울릉 태하동 솔송나무·섬잣나무·너도밤나무군락)	Taeha-ri, Seo-myeon, Ulleung County, Gyeongsangbuk-do	A 171,792 m^{2} (1,849,150 sq ft) community of southern Japanese hemlock, Japanese white pine, and Chinese beech in Taeha-dong. Although common to Japan, in South Korea these species are found only on Ulleung-do. The beeches can grow up to 20 m (66 ft) in height, while the hemlocks and white pines can reach 30 m (98 ft). The rarity of the species makes them valuable for research, the pine in particular having only a very narrow distribution on the island.	

=== 51–100 ===
Numbers 54 to 58, 61, 67, 68, 70 to 72, 75, 77, 80, 81, 83, 85 to 87, 90, 92, 94, 97, 99, and 100 were delisted due to these monuments being destroyed, deemed of lost value of preservation or located in unrestored regions of the Republic of Korea (now occupied by the DPRK, which are matters South Korea deals in the Committee for the Five Northern Korean Provinces), or simply unregistered.

#	Name	Location	Description	Refs
51	Cotoneaster wilsonii and Insular abelia of Do-dong (울릉 도동 섬개야광나무와 섬댕강나무군락)	Dodong-ri, Nam-myeon, Ulleung County, Gyeongsangbuk-do	A 49,587 m^{2} (533,750 sq ft) community of cotoneaster wilsonii and abelia insularis near the village of Dodong-ri. In South Korea, these rare shrubs are found only on Ulleung-do. Growing sporadically along the coastal cliffs, abelia insularis can reach a height of 1 m (3.3 ft) and produces fruit that ripens in September. Cotoneaster wilsonii can grow up to 1.5 m (4.9 ft), its flowers blooming from May to June. The later species was once limited to the mountain behind the village, but was transplanted to another mountain face nearby to ensure its survival.	
52	Chrysanthemum lucidum and Thymus magnus in Nari-dong (나리동의 울릉국화, 섬백리향군락)	Na-ri, Buk-myeon, Ulleung County, Gyeongsangbuk-do	A 5,807 m^{2} (62,510 sq ft) community of Ulleung chrysanthemums and five-ribbed thyme shrubs near the village of Na-ri. Both species are endemic to Ulleung-do, growing sporadically in unshaded areas. Located in a valley on the island's only level and open ground, the designated monument is fenced from other species. The white Ulleung chrysanthemum blossoms from September to October, while the thyme shrubs give off a strong fragrance. They were first registered as natural monuments by the Japanese Government General.	
53	Jindo Dog (진도의 진도개)	Jindo, Jeollanam-do	Endemic to the isle of Jindo, the jindo dog population registered as a natural monument was 5573 in 2009 and increasing. A fully grown male will reach a height of 48–53 cm (19–21 in), a female, 45–50 cm (18–20 in). Agile with well-developed senses of smell and sight, the jindo is an excellent hunting dog. By some accounts, the breed was introduced to the island after a Southern Song dynasty trading ship was wrecked nearby.	
59	Ginkgo Tree of the Confucian Shrine of Seoul (서울 문묘 은행나무)	Myeongnyun-dong, Jongno-gu, Seoul	A ginkgo tree at the Confucian shrine of Sungkyunkwan University. One of a pair located in the courtyard, the tree reaches a height of 21 m (69 ft). It has an erect trunk with evenly distributed branches, from which hang several large adventitious roots. Estimated to be about 400 years old, it was planted in 1519 by Yun Tak (1472–1534), the head of the National Confucian Academy.	
60	Lacebark Pine of Songpo (송포의 백송)	Deogi-dong, Ilsan, Goyang, Gyeonggi-do	A lacebark pine in Deogi-dong, Ilsan. The tree is situated along a roadside, the surrounding area heavily developed with factories and warehouses. The trunk branches off into two directions and reaches a height of 10 m (33 ft). The tree is estimated to be about 250 years old. By one tradition, it was planted by the Joseon dynasty General Choi Suwon, during the reign of King Sejong (r.1418–1450). In another account, it was a gift from a Chinese envoy to a man named Yu Hagyeom, during the reign of King Seonjo (r.1567–1608), for which it is also called "The Pine of Tang" (唐松).	
62	Forest of Oriental Arborvitae in Yeongcheon-ri (영천리의 측백수림)	Yengcheon-ri, Maepo-eup, Danyang County, Chungcheongbuk-do	A 54,913 m^{2} (591,080 sq ft) forest of oriental arborvitae in Yeongcheon. The trees grow along a limestone hill, their height reaching 2.5–3.5 m (8.2–11.5 ft). The low volume of traffic on the adjacent highway to Jecheon has had little adverse effect on the forest compared to the lime kiln that was once nearby. This area has proven to be relatively good for the species to grow, and may be its northern boundary in Korea. The floor of the forest is covered in ferns, and there have been discoveries of holly fern, which is normally found in more temperate climates.	
63	Natural Habitat of Formosa rice trees on Bijindo island (통영비진도의 팔손이나무자생지)	Bijin-ri, Hansan-myeon, Tongyeong, Gyeongsangnam-do	Formosa rice trees grow on the southern shore of Korea's mainland and on Geojedo Island. The Korean name of the tree, Palsoninamu (palsoni means “eight fingers”), originated from the fact that its leaves are divided into between 7 and 9 parts. It is also known as Palgakgeumban or Palgeumban. Bijindo Island in Hansan-myeon, Tongyeong City is a natural habitat of Formosa rice trees. This tree was once damaged by a typhoon. Camellias, magnolias, and ardisia japonica also grow in the vicinity. According to a local story about this species of tree, there was once an Indian princess named Vasba who received a set of twin rings as a 17th birthday present from her mother. One day, however, a maid who was cleaning the princess's room put the rings on her thumbs out of curiosity. Unfortunately, she couldn't pull the rings off her fingers, and became so frightened that she covered them up completely. To appease his sorrowful princess, the king had all the people in the palace searched for the rings, but when her turn came the maid only showed her eight fingers, and not her thumbs. At that moment, lightning flashed and thunder filled the air, and the maid was transformed into a palsoninamu. Bijindo Island in Tongyeong is significant as the northernmost habitat of Formosa rice trees, and has been designated as Natural Monument (No. 63) for its protection.	
64	Ginkgo Tree of Duseo-myeon (두서면의 은행나무)	Guryang-ri, Duseo-myeon, Ulju County, Ulsan	A ginkgo tree near the village of Jungni. Situated between agricultural fields, the tree reaches a height of 22 m (72 ft). It was heavily damaged in 2003 by Typhoon Maemi, losing about a third of the trunk, and is now held aloft with metal supports. The tree is estimated to be about 550 years old. By tradition, it was planted in the early Joseon dynasty by the scholar Lee Jidae, who, after retiring from government service, brought the tree from the capital and planted it by the lotus pond at his home. In addition to being appreciated for its beauty, the tree was well known among villagers for its ability to give infertile women a son.	
65	Evergreen Forest of Mokdo (목도의 상록수림)	Bangdo-ri, Onsas-eup, Ulju County, Ulsan	A 15,074 m^{2} (162,260 sq ft) forest on the uninhabited island of Mokdo, just offshore of Ulsan's Onsan Industrial Park. The island is the sole along Korea's east coast to have an evergreen forest, possessing flora which display the climatic features of the Korean Peninsula. Sometimes called Chundo (椿島) for its plentiful camellia trees, records indicate that the island previously boasted 20 species of tree and 31 species of herb. It has also been called Jukdo (竹島) for its many bamboo trees, with which, according to tradition, arrows were made for the Imjin War and the Second Manhu Invasion, although the number of bamboo on the island has since dwindled.	
66	Northernmost Limit of Natural Growth of Camellia in Daecheongdo (대청도의 동백나무자생북한지)	Daecheong-ri, Baengnyeong-myeon, Ongjin County, Incheon	Camellias are distributed throughout Japan, China, and Korea. In Korea they grow mainly in the south coast area and on nearby islands. Although they usually blossom in early spring, camellias are also called “spring Camellias,” “fall Camellias,” or “winter Camellias” depending the season in which they blossom. Due to the warm ocean current, camellias grow well in the natural habitat in Daecheongdo Island. According to a record dated some 60 years ago, there were 147 Camellias with a diameter of over 20 cm as well as some large ones measuring 3m in height and 27 cm in diameter. However, nowadays, it is difficult to find large camellias, as the number of trees was drastically reduced all over the country due to illegal gathering. The natural habitat in Daecheongdo Island marks the northernmost extension of camellias. Since it is an important material for academic research, it has been designated as Natural Monument (No. 66).	
69	Orbicular Granite in Unpyeong-ri, Sangju (운평리구상화강암)	Unpyeong-ri, Nakdong-myeon, Sangju, Gyeongsangbuk-do	An orbicular bead is a round piece of stone that it is formed in particular environmental conditions, usually in granitic layers of rock. The orbicular granite in Unpyeong-ri contains a lot of diorite that is believed to have formed when magma rose to the earth’s surface during a massive diastrophism in the Korean Peninsula about 2.3 million years ago. Eight groups of granite boulders were discovered in Ungok-ri valley in Unpyeong-ri, to the southeast of Sangju, six of which are submerged below the water of the valley while two lie exposed above the water. Villagers refer to these granite boulders as 'turtle rocks' because of their supposed resemblance to turtle shells. Each orbicular bead has a diameter of 5-13 centimeters and a black edge. This kind of stone is only found in some 100 locations around the world. The orbicular granite found in Unpyeong-ri is a geologically rare material of considerable value to studies on the formation of rock. They have been designated and conserved as Natural Monument (No.69) as they provide important data for research on the composition of rock.	
73	Habitat of Manchurian Trouts near Jeongamsa Temple, Jeongseon(정선 정암사의 열목어서식지)	Gohan-ri, Gohn-eup, Jeongseon County, Gangwon-do	The Manchurian trout is a species of freshwater fish that lives in water at a temperature of less than 20 °C. Its skin is covered with small irregular red spots against a silvery-white background. During spawning time, its whole body becomes red, and its dorsal and pectoral fins acquire a rainbow-like luster. It usually feeds on the larvae of insects in water and small fish. In Korea, Manchurian trout are found in the Amnokgang, Dumangang, Cheongcheongang, Daedonggang, and Hangang Rivers and in the upper reaches of the Nakdonggang River. In summer they stay in cooler areas, usually in the upper reaches of a river, while in winter they remain in midstream areas. Since the habitat of Manchurian trout in Jeongamsa Temple is the southernmost part in the world where this fish can live in the well-developed forest as an optimal environment. It is a protected species and has been designated as Natural Monument (No. 73).	
74	Habitat of Manchurian Trouts in Daehyeon-ri, Bonghwa(봉화 대현리 열목어 서식지)	Daehyeon-ri, Seokpo-myeon, Bonghwa County, Gyeongsangbuk-do	The Manchurian trout is a species of freshwater fish that lives in water at a temperature of less than 20 °C. Its skin is covered with small irregular red spots against a silvery-white background. During spawning time, its whole body becomes red, and its dorsal and pectoral fins acquire a rainbow-like luster. It usually feeds on the larvae of insects in water and small fish. In Korea, Manchurian trout are found in the Amnokgang, Dumangang, Cheongcheongang, Daedonggang, and Hangang Rivers and in the upper reaches of the Nakdonggang River. In summer they stay in cooler areas, usually in the upper reaches of a river, while in winter they remain in midstream areas. The Habitat of Manchurian Trout in Daehyeon-ri, Seokpo-myeon, Bonghwa marks the southernmost extent of this rare fish, for which well-developed forest areas are the optimal environment. It is a protected species and has been designated as Natural Monument (No. 74).	
76	Ginkgo Tree in Yeongwol (영월의 은행나무)	Hasong-ri, Yeongwol-eup, Yeongwol County, Gangwon-do	A ginkgo tree on the outskirts of Hasong-ri, Yeongol. The tree is situated alone atop a hill that overlooks where the confluence of the Seo River and the Dong River forms the Namhan River. It has a massive and well-proportioned crown atop its erect trunk, rising to a height of 38 m (125 ft). By tradition the tree was planted by Eom Imeui, the progenitor of the Eom clan, and is estimated to be about 1300 years old. Descriptions of it appear in Korean literature, and ancient records from the Joseon royal library. It is famous for predicting major events with the loss of a large branch, including the annexation of Korea, liberation and the Korean War.	
78	Poncirus Tree of Gapgot-ri, Ganghwa (강화갑곶리의 탱자나무)	Gapgot-ri, Ganghwa-eup, Ganghwa County, Incheon	A poncirus tree on Ganghwa Island, which forms the northern boundary of the species. The tree is located by the Ganghwa History Museum, at the bottom of the ancient Gapgotdon fortifications. Reaching a height of 4.2 m (14 ft), the tree's crown leans over heavily. Its thick trunk, flush with branches and covered in thorns, has become rotted near the base. This tree is estimated to be about 400 years old. As a supplement to the moat, poncirus trees such as this were often tightly planted around a fort to make a defensive wall of thorns.	
79	Poncirus Tree of Sagi-ri, Ganghwa (강화사기리의 탱자나무)	Sagi-ri, Hwado-myeon, Ganghwa County, Incheon	A poncirus tree on Ganghwa Island, which forms the northern boundary of the species. The tree is located across from the birthplace of the late Joseon scholar Lee Geonchang (1852–1898). Rising to a height of 3.6 m (12 ft), the thorn covered trunk divides into three sections, each forming its own crown. One section is held aloft with supports. The tree is estimated to be about 400 years old. This tree appears to have once been part of a wall of poncirus trees, forming a defensive wall of thorns around a fort.	
82	Forest of Sinensis hackberry and Tschonoskii hornbeam in Cheongcheon-ri, Muan (무안 청천리 팽나무와 개서어나무숲)	Cheongcheon-ri, Cheonggye-myeon, Muan County, Jeollanam-do	A 11,969 m^{2} (128,830 sq ft) forest by the village of Cheongcheon-ri. The forest is adjacent Route 1 and serves as a park for local residents. It was planted to protect homes and crops from the strong typhoon winds coming from the coast, which had once been visible from the village. With trees reaching an average height of 15 m (49 ft), the forest is mainly populated by hackberry trees, as well as hornbeam and some zelkova trees. Estimated to be about 500 years old, according to tradition the forest was planted by the progenitor of the Bae clan of Dalseong.	
84	Ginkgo Tree in Haengjeong, Geumsan (금산행정의 은행나무)	Yogwang-ri, Chubu-myeon, Geumsan County, Chungcheongnam-do	A ginkgo tree near the village of Yogwang-ri. Reaching a height of 24 m (79 ft), the tree stands alone surrounded by flat country. The crown appears damaged from strong local winds, having lost several large branches in 1905, 1925, and post-liberation. Several branches are now secured to the trunk with cables, and a cavity in the lower part of the trunk has also been filled. The tree is estimated to be about 1000 years old, known by local villagers as the "Haengjeon Pavilion (杏亭) Ginkgo", after the eponymous pavilion that once stood nearby.	
88	Pair of Chinese Junipers of Songgwangsa Temple (송광사의 곱향나무쌍향수)	Ieup-ri, Songgwang-myeon, Suncheon, Jeollanam-do	A pair of Chinese junipers at Cheonjaam, a hermitage of the Buddhist temple Songgwangsa. Situated next to Nahajeon Hall, the trees grow so close together they look as if they were joined. Only 70 cm (28 in) separate the trunks, which wind and twist to a height of 12 m (39 ft). The junipers have very limited growing space, and the cavities in the trunks appear to have been extensively filled. Both are estimated to be about 800 years old. According to tradition, they took root after the monk Jinul (1158–1210) and his disciple Seongjing planted the canes they used during their travels to China.	
89	Wisterias of Oryu-ri (경주 오류리의 등나무)	Oryu-ri, Hyeongok-myeon, Gyeongju, Gyeongsangbuk-do	A group of four Japanese wisterias in the village of Oryu-ri. Located near a brook in what was once a lotus pond, the trees twine around a Chinese nettle tree and reach a height of about 12 m (39 ft). The trees are estimated to be about 1000 years old. Locally, they are known as the "Dragon Wisterias" (龍藤), a reference to either their location in the Dragon Forest (龍林), which was used by the Silla king and his retainers to hunt, or to the shape of the trunks, which writhe like a dragon's body. According to legend, placing their dried flowers into the bedding of newlyweds brings greater closeness between husband and wife.	
91	Population of Daphniphyllum macropodum in Naejangsan Mountain (내장산 굴거리나무군락)	Naejang-dong, Jeongeup, Jeollabuk-do	Daphniphyllum macropodum is distributed in China, Japan, and Korea. In Korea in particular, it grows in warm places such as coastal areas in the south, Jejudo Island, Naejangsan Mountain, and Baegunsan Mountain in Jeolla-do. Named "Gyoyangmok" in Chinese characters since it bears new leaves and loses the old ones, it makes for a good garden tree and enjoys popularity as a roadside tree. The Population of Macropodous Daphniphyllum is situated at the summit of a mountain in front of Naejangsa Temple. A big Daphniphyllum macropodum is rarely seen in Korea and the inhabitants call the leaves of the tree “Manbyeongcho” as the leaves resemble a medicinal herb Manbyeongcho. Since the northernmost habitat has academic value, the population of Daphniphyllum macropodum in Naejangsan Mountain is designated and protected as a natural monument.	
93	Turtelary Forest of Seongnam-ri, Wonseong (원성 성남리 성황림)	Seongnam-ri, Sillim-myeon, Wonju, Gangwon-do	Seonghwangnim (Tutelary Forest) means a forest where a local god who protects the town lives. The shrine woods in Seongnam-ri, Wonseong, is a little far from town. Villagers in Seongnam-ri have believed the local god of Chiaksan Mountain to be their guardian. Seonghwangnim consists of many trees such as Carstor Aralia and Rubus coreanus. The people in the village performed a sacrificial ritual for the god wishing for the well-being and peace of the town twice a year on April 8 and September 9. The Tutelary Forest of Seongnam-ri, Wonseong, has representative deciduous trees of temperate regions as well as biological value. Therefore, it is designated and protected as a natural monument.	
95	Long-leafed Zelkova in Dogye-eup, Samcheok (삼척도계읍의 긴잎느티나무)	Dogye-ri, Dogye-eup, Samcheok, Gangwon-do	A Japanese zelkova in the village of Dogye-ri. The tree's upright trunk rises to a height of 20 m (66 ft), while the longer than normal leaves have led some specialists into considering it part of a subspecies. It was damaged by a typhoon in 1988, as well as having many calluses and filled cavities. The tree is estimated to be about 1000 years old. Scholars taking refuge from official purges during the late Goryeo and early Joseon Dynasties often came to this tree to consider their future. In modern times parents have come here to wish their children success on their entrance examinations.	
96	Asian Cork-oak Tree in Uljin (울진 수산리 굴참나무)	Susan-ri, Gunnam-myeon, Uljin County, Gyeongsangbuk-do	A cork-oak tree near the village of Susan-ri. The tree is 20 m (66 ft) tall, located on a hill where the national and coastal highways meet. Its trunk was heavily damaged by typhoon Sarah in 1959, and is still in a state of recovery. The tree is estimated to be about 350 years old. It was venerated as a guardian deity and once had an adjacent shrine. According to tradition, a king once took refuge under the tree while being pursued during a war, an hence the name of the nearby river, Wangpicheon (Hidden King River, 王避川).	
98	Gimnyeonggul and Manjanggul Lava Tubes, Jeju (제주도 김녕굴 및 만장굴)	Gimnyeong-ri, Gujwa-eup, Jeju City, Jeju-do	As typical lava tubes in Northeastern Jeju-do, Gimnyeonggul and Manjanggul Lava Tubes had originally been connected but were divided into two tubes due to the cave-in. Manjanggul Lava Tube which is one of the largest lava tubes in the world is about 7.4 kilometers long. There are many lava tubes formations such as lava stalactites, lava stalagmites, and lava stone pillars. The tracks of lava flow on the floor serve as valuable data for researching the process of lava tubes formation. On the other hand, Gimnyeonggul Lava Tube is about 700 meters long. The tracks of lava flow remain on its floor, with hardened lava shaped like a waterfall found at the end of the tube. Unlike lime caves, Gimnyeonggul and Manjanggul Lava Tubes in Jeju-do were formed by lava. As these two lava tubes are world-renowned in scale and are valuable data for research, they are designated and protected as a natural monument.	

=== 100–199 ===
Numbers, 102 104 105 109 113 116 117 .118, 119 ,120 121 125 127 ,128 129 130 .131,132, 133.134 135,137,139,140,141,142,143,144,145,148,149,157,181,186,187,188 were delisted due to these monuments being destroyed, deemed of lost value of preservation or located in unrestored regions of the Republic of Korea (now occupied by the DPRK, which are matters South Korea deals in the Committee for the Five Northern Korean Provinces), or simply unregistered.

#	Name	Location	Description	Refs
101	Sanctuary of Tundra Swans on Jindo Island(진도고니류도래지)	1422, Suyu-ri, Jindo-eup, Jindo-gun, Jeollanam-do	An egret breeds in Europe, Russia, Mongolia, and China. This bird moves to Africa, India, and Korea and winters from November to February. In Korea, it passes winter around a seaside; when spring comes, it moves again to the north to breed. The egret is known as a lucky omen not only in Korea but also everywhere in the world. The Sanctuary of Tundra Swans on Jindo Island is located southwest of the Korean peninsula. This region is the only place where the egret can winter in the southern sea and is fit for a moving egret flock. It is protected from environmental pollution since it is away from a large city. Recently, however, bird food has diminished due to land reclamation so egrets used to spread and winter around the nearby seaside. The Sanctuary of Tundra Swans on Jindo Island is designated and protected as a Natural Monument because it is the only area where the egret can over-winter southwest of Korea.	
126	Gray whale migration coast of Ulsan (울산 귀신고래 회유해면)	Ulsan coast, Gangwon-do, Gyeongsangbuk-do	A protected zone to secure migrating gray whales along Ulsan coast.	
146	Chilgok Geummu-bong Tree Fern Fossil Site	Chilgok-gun, Gyeongsangbuk-do	A fossil site, part of the Nakdong Formation, containing fossils of the extinct plant species, Xenoxylon latiporosum	
155	Seongryugul Cave	Uljin	Limestone cave	
163	Elaeocarpus sylvestris var. ellipticus of Cheonjiyeon Waterfall	Cheonjiyeon Waterfall	Dampalsu trees (Korean name for Elaeocarpus sylvestris) grow in warm temperate forests and are not suited to the cold, so they grow only in the Jeju Island area in Korea. The tree is beautiful in the shape of an umbrella, and the red leaves continue throughout the year, and it is characterized by the interspersed red leaves that are always red. Dampalsu trees in Seogwipo grow along the waters edge of Cheonjiyeon. There are 5 trees growing on the hill west of Cheonjiyeon, and they are about 9m high. Seogwipo Dampalsu trees' natural habitat is designated and protected as a natural monument because it is the northern limit of the Dampalsu, so it has also high plant distribution research value.	
169	Maryang-ri Camellia Forest (마량리 동백나무 숲)	Maryang-ri, Seocheon-gun, Chungcheongnam-do	Maryang-ri Camellia Forest is located on a low hill by the sea, about 4.5 km from Seodo Elementary School. A little further up the hill is a small pavilion called Dongbaekjeong (冬栢亭), where about 80 camellia trees grow scattered. They are short due to the strong wind, and the tree reaching 2~3m has a round shape as the trunk splits from the ground into 2~3 trunks and the side branches develop.It is said that this forest was created for the purpose of a windbreak to block the wind of a village about 500m away, but its function is hard to find. According to legend, about 300 years ago, a local official saw a bouquet floating on the sea in a dream and went to the beach. After that, people gather here every year in the first month of the lunar calendar to hold ancestral rites and pray for no disaster in fishing. Maryang-ri camellia forest is one of the few camellia forests in Korea and has high plant distribution value as it is located on the northern limit of where camellia trees grow. It is also designated as a natural monument because of its cultural value as a forest that preserves legends and ceremonies for big fish catches.	
171	Seoraksan National Park (설약산)	Gangwon-do	Seoraksan National park was designated the 5th national park in Korea in 1970 and chosen as a nature preservation area on November 5, 1965. Also, internationally recognized for its rare species, Seoraksan is the area in Korea to have been designated as a Biosphere Preservation District by UNESCO in 1982, and in IUCN recognized its rich natural resources and labeled it category II (National Park). The total area of Seoraksan National park is 398.539 km^{2} and it is divided among the areas of Inge-gun, Goseong-gun, Yangyang-gun, and Sokcho-si, Naeseorak (Inner) is in Inje, Naeseorak (South) is the area from Hangyerteong (Ridge) to Osaek, and Oeseorak (Outer) lies in the eastern area across Sokcho-si, Yangyang-gun, and Goseong-gun. Including its main peak, Daecheongbong, Seoraksan has a total of 30 imposing peaks spread across its territory such as Hwachaebong, Hangyeryeong, and Madeungryeong.	
178	Samcheok Daeiri cave zone ( includes Hwanseon Cave) (삼척 대이리 동굴지대)	Gangwon-do	The largest limestone cave in Korea and one of the largest in Asia called Hwanseon Cave is located.The Samcheok Daeiri Cave Area is located near Duta Mountain, about 12 km north of Dogye-eup, Samcheok-si, Gangwon-do. The cave was created by the erosion of water dissolving limestone. Currently, 10 caves have been discovered, and the representative caves are Daegeumgul Cave, Gwaneumgul Cave, and Hwanseongul Cave. Gwaneumgul Cave is also called Galmaegul Cave, and the length of the cave is 1.2 km. Inside the cave, there are cave creatures such as stalactites that look like icicles and stalagmites protruding from the ground. In addition, water more than 1m deep flows continuously, reminiscent of an underwater cave. In the depths of the cave, four large and small cave waterfalls form a spectacular view. Hwanseongul Cave is located on the peak of Galmaesan Mountain at a height of 782m after passing Gwaneumgul Cave. The length of the cave is 3.5 km, and it is a water cave connected to several empty caves. Inside the cave, there are valleys created by cave depressions and three waterfalls over 10m in height. The cave area in Daeiri, Samcheok is large and has good environmental conditions, so many rare cave creatures, including circumstellar beetles, inhabit it. Currently, Daeiri Cave Zone in Samcheok is designated as an open restricted area except for the open sections of Daegeum Cave and Hwanseon Cave to protect cave products, etc. have.	
182	Mount Hallasan Nature Reserve (한라산 천연보호구역)	Jeju-do	A 91,620,591 m^{2} (986,195,830 sq ft) nature reserve centered around Hallasan, a shield volcano and South Korea's highest peak. The reserve 1,565 varieties of plant, 873 insects, 198 birds, 17 mammals, and 8 reptiles in multiple areas around Jeju-do between 600 m (2,000 ft) and 1,300 m (4,300 ft) above sea level. The terrain features diverse geological and geographic features such as a crater lake.	

=== 200–400 ===
Numbers 208, 210, 213, 230, 231, 257, 258, 264, 269, 276, 277, 282, 290, 297, 306, 308, 310, 316, 338, 350, 353, and 369 were delisted due to these monuments being destroyed, deemed of lost value of preservation, or because they are located in unrestored regions of the Republic of Korea (now occupied by the DPRK, which are matters South Korea deals in the Committee for the Five Northern Korean Provinces).

#	Name	Location	Description	Refs
200	Black stork (Ciconia nigra) (먹황새)	Nationwide	The distribution area of the black stork is as follows; Iran, Amure, Usuri, the north of the northeastern districts in China, Korea, Japan, Africa, India. The body's length of black stork is 96 cm and the head and the neck, the upper chest and the back are glossy black. The belly is white and the bill, the legs and the eyesides are red. The young bird totally has a blurred color mixed brown. This bird inhabits rice fields, riversides or small valleys and lives single and couple. It builds a nest on the top of a remote high tree or on the twig of rock cliff and lays 3 to 5 white eggs.The black-headed stork is designated and is conserved as a Natural Monument because it is a winter migrant which rarely comes out from September to October and from January to February in Korea.	
329	Moon bear (반달가슴곰)	Nationwide	Also known as the Asiatic black bear and White-Chested bear, is a medium-sized bear species native to Asia that is largely adapted to an arboreal lifestyle. It lives in the Himalayas, southeastern Iran, the northern parts of the Indian subcontinent, the Korean Peninsula, China, the Russian Far East, the islands of Honshū and Shikoku in Japan, and Taiwan. It is listed as vulnerable on the IUCN Red List, and is threatened by deforestation and poaching for its body parts, which are used in traditional medicine.	
330	Eurasian otter (수달)	Nationwide	Also known as the European otter, Eurasian river otter, common otter, and Old World otter, is a semiaquatic mammal native to Eurasia. The most widely distributed member of the otter subfamily (Lutrinae) of the weasel family (Mustelidae), it is found in the waterways and coasts of Europe, many parts of Asia, and parts of northern Africa. The Eurasian otter has a diet mainly of fish, and is strongly territorial. It is endangered in some parts of its range, but is recovering in others.	
336	Liancourt Rocks (독도)	Ulleungdo	The Liancourt Rocks form a group of islets in the Sea of Japan between the Korean peninsula and the Japanese archipelago. The Liancourt Rocks comprise two main islets and 35 smaller rocks; the total surface area of the islets is 0.187554 square kilometres (46.346 acres) and the highest elevation of 168.5 metres (553 ft) is on the West Islet. The Liancourt Rocks lie in rich fishing grounds that may contain large deposits of natural gas. The English name Liancourt Rocks is derived from Le Liancourt, the name of a French whaling ship that came close to being wrecked on the rocks in 1849.	
349	Gwaneumsong Pine Tree in Cheongnyeongpo, Yeongwol (영월 청령포 관음송)	Yeongwol, Gangwon-do	Gwaneumsong Pine Tree grows in Cheongnyeongpo Harbor, Yeongwol.	
368	Sapsali of Jingshan (경산의 삽살개)	Nationwide	Sapsali is a dog found in the southeast part of Korean Peninsula. The dog has a bold and brave nature, and it is loyal to its owner. Sapsali means "dogs that expel evil and misfortune".	
385	Ginkgo Tree of Seongdong-ri, Gangjin	Seongdong-ri, Gangjin County, South Jeolla Province	A ginkgo tree believed to have been mentioned in the earliest written account of Korea by a Westerner. Dutch sailor Hendrick Hamel was stranded in Joseon between 1653 and 1666. After he escaped to Japan, he wrote an account of his time on the peninsula.	

=== 401–500 ===
Number 425 was delisted due to the tree dying, losing the value to be protected.

#	Name	Location	Description	Refs
453	Korean terrapin (남생이)	Nationwide	The Korean terrapin (Geoclemys reevesii Gray) is a turtle that inhabits unpolluted mountain streams and is found in Korea, Japan, China, and Taiwan. The carapace is brown, measuring 20–25 cm long and shaped like an elongated oval. The edges are smooth with a yellowish-green band around the edges and a faint black pattern, which is unusual. There is a low ridge down the back, which is covered in small black scales with uneven vertical lines at the ends of the sides. The four limbs are covered in wide scales. The turtle lives in freshwater and is omnivorous, eating fish, crustacea, and aquatic plants. Between June and August it digs a hole in the sand and lays 5–15 eggs. This turtle often appeared in old folk paintings, as it was once a very common reptile in rivers around the country. Numbers, however, are dropping rapidly due to pollution and modification of river habitats, collection of aggregate from rivers, diminishing of forests, and spread of foreign species (i.e. red-eared slider). In addition, the number has dropped further through uncontrolled hunting of the turtles for use in folk remedies and herbal medicine. The turtles are said to be good for nutrition, strength and vitality.	
473	Pine Tree Forest in Hahoe, Andong (안동 하회마을 만송정숲)	Hahoe, Pungcheon-myeon, Andong, Gyeongsangbuk-do	A 145,219 m^{2} (1,563,120 sq ft) grove of pine trees alongside the Nakdong River. Serving as a wind break and flood defense, the current forest was replanted about a century ago, and the trees now reach a height of 15 m (49 ft) to 20 m (66 ft). It was originally planted by Ryu Unryong (1539–1601) in the Joseon dynasty to mitigate the geomantic energy coming from Buyongdae, a cliff opposite the village of Hahoe, and is named "Forest of Ten Thousand Pines" (萬松亭). A festival for the forest is held in the seventh month of the lunar calendar.	
484	Yulgongmae Plum of Ojukheon House, Gangneung (강릉 오죽헌 율곡매)	Gangneung, Gangwon-do	This plum tree is said to have been planted sometime around 1400 when Ojukheon House was built.	
485	Plum Tree of Hwaeomsa Temple in Gurye (구례 화엄사 매화)	Hwangjeon-ri, Masan-myeon, Gurye, Jeollanam-do	A Chinese plum tree at Gilsangam, a hermitage of the Buddhist temple Hwaeomsa. The tree is located amongst a forest of bamboo trees along the approach to the hermitage, and is accompanied by a small lotus pond. Reaching a height of 7.8 m (26 ft), the tree is estimated to be about 450 years old. According to tradition, it was originally one of four plum trees brought from China and planted on the temple grounds, though the other three have since died.	

=== 501–570 ===
Numbers, 506, 521, 541 were delisted due to these monuments being destroyed or affected by the Typhoons.

#	Name	Location	Description	Refs
501	The geological fold structures of Maldo Island in Gunsan	Gunsan	The Precambrian strata of Maldo in Okdo-myeon, Gunsan still retains the sedimentary structure such as wavy fossils and sloped strata despite severe metamorphism and transformation. This stratum has important academic value in that it is possible to interpret the sedimentary environment of the Precambrian period in Korea through the study of this structure. In addition, this stratum shows well the various structures created by the later crustal deformation. Among these structures, it is unusual not only to have various forms and types of folds, but also to have various structures that are incidental to the formation of folds. . Among them, there are rare structures that are hard to find in Korea (duplex structure with single layer, overlapping folds made in several stages, etc.) and are in a very good state of preservation. These are important features that differentiate this stratum from the Precambrian strata in other regions of Korea.	
547	Pohang Noeseongsan Noeroksanji	Pohang	Green Earth Pigment (Celadonite) Site in Noeseongsan Mountain, Pohang. Noerok (뇌록), Celadonite, is a mineral resource created by geological processes. It is green in color and can be easily made into powder, and was a traditional natural pigment used in Joseon Dynasty buildings. The site on Noesongsan Mountain is the only Noerok producing site in South Korea.	

== See also ==
- Cultural Heritage Administration
- Environment of South Korea
- Natural monuments of North Korea
