= Maryang-ri Camellia Forest =

Protected area in South Korea

- Korean: 마량리 동백나무 숲
- IUCN category IV (habitat/species management area)
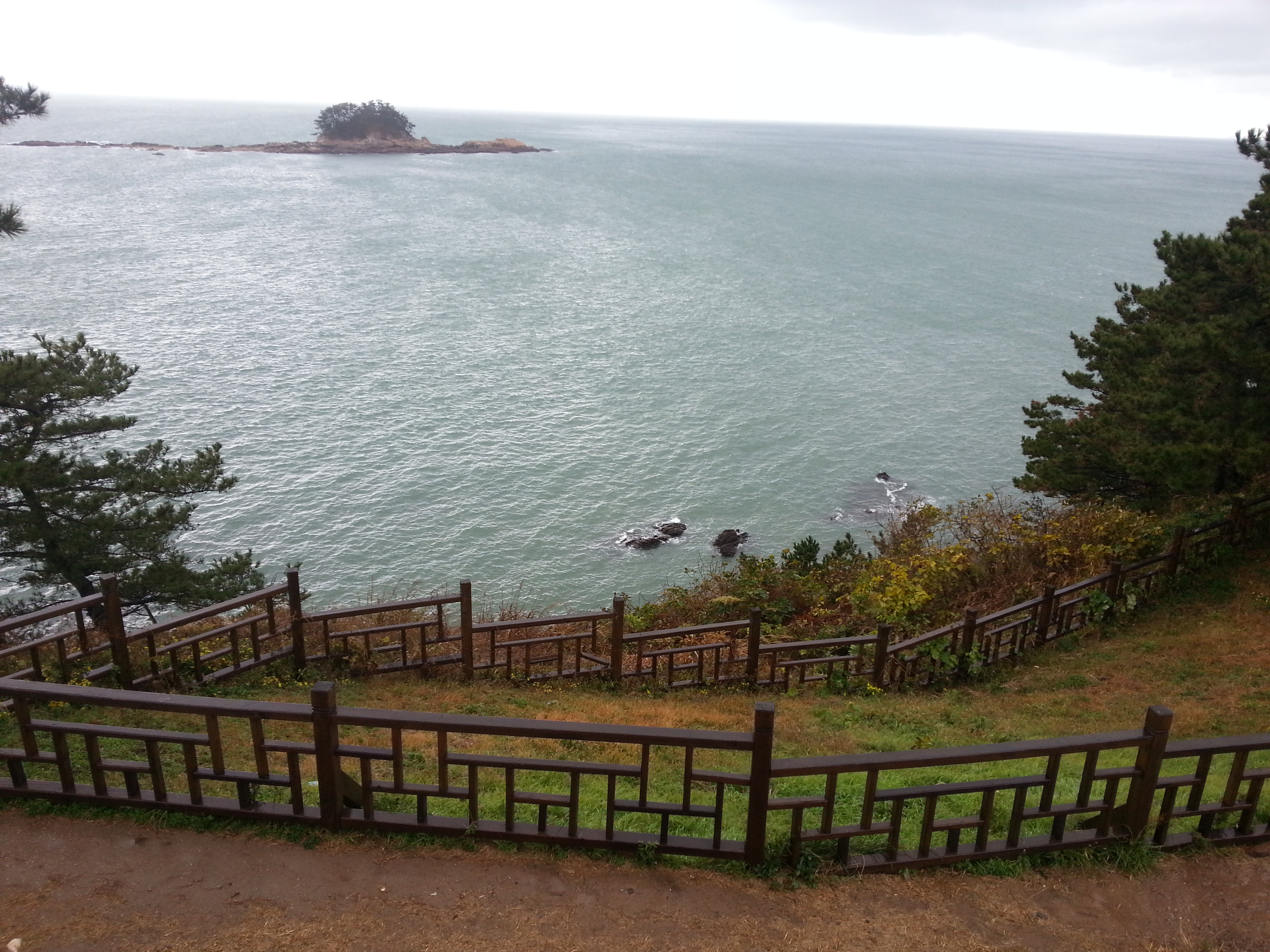
- The scenery of the West Sea from the 'Dongbaekjeong'

- Location within South Korea
- Location: Seocheon-gun, Chungcheongnam-do
- Nearest city: Gunsan
- Coordinates: 36°08′13″N 126°29′38″E
- Established: 1965
- Governing body: Cultural Heritage Administration

Maryang-ri Camellia Forest (Korean: 마량리 동백나무 숲) is a camellia forest located in Maryang-ri, Seocheon-gun, Chungcheongnam-do. It is one of the 8 Scenic Spots of Seocheon (서천팔경; 舒川八景) and was designated as Natural Monument No.169 in 1965. There are about 85 aerials of camellia trees over 500 years old in this area and has a dense forest of 8,265 square metres (2.042 acres).

Located in Maryang-ri, the forest is situated on a low hill about 4.5 kilometers away from the coast of Seodo Elementary School. At the top of the hill there is a small pavilion called Dongbaekjeong. 'Dongbaekjeong' means a pavilion with camellia blossoms. From late March to early May, you can enjoy the camellia blossom from here. The scenery of the West Sea in the 'Dongbaekjeong' is beautiful. Especially, there is an 'Oryeokdo' island in the front of the pavilion, and the scenery of the island and the sea looks great. The western forest of Maryang-ri suffers strong winds, and there are only a few left. About 70 trees are distributed in the east of the forest. The camellia tree, a member of the tea family, is a warm temperate zone evergreen tree that grows up to seven meters tall. However, the trees here are about two meters tall, and is spread by the strong wind.

The forest is one of the few camellia forests in South Korea. The area is visited by many tourists because of its geographical characteristics, and a place where both sunrises and sunsets may be seen. During the year end and New Year's, the festival is held at Maryang Port, and various events such as Si-nangsong (poetry recitation), fireworks, and balloons are held.

On the opposite side of the Maryang-ri Camellia Forest, there is a Seocheon Thermal Power Plant. It is the first plant in South Chungcheong Province, constructed in Chungcheongnam-do in 1984. And the generating capacity of the thermoelectric power plant is 400,000 kW.

== See also ==
- Sinseong-ri Reed Field
- Natural monuments of South Korea
