= Andeok Valley =

Valley in Jeju Province, South Korea

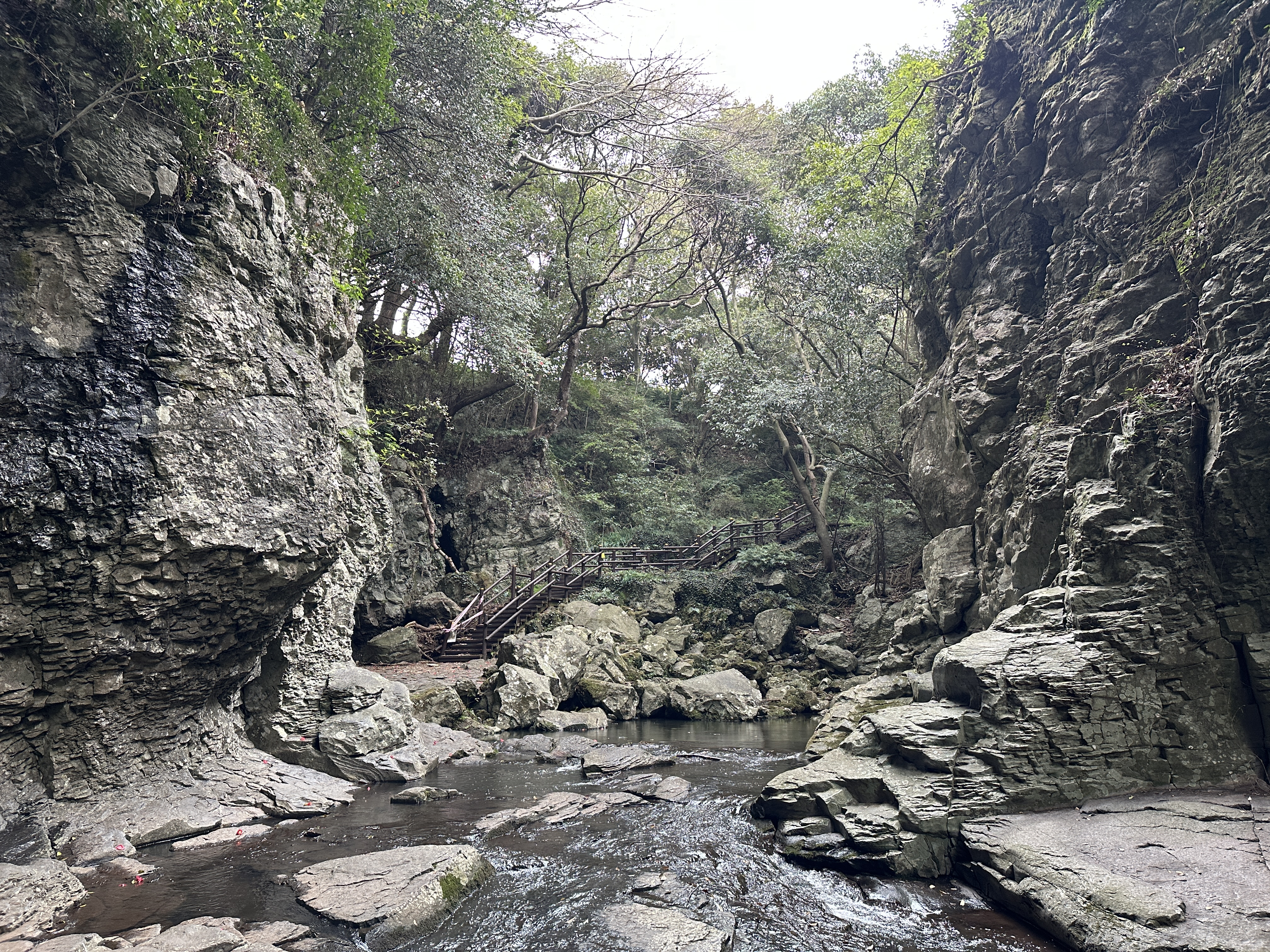
- Part of the valley (2026)

Geography
- Coordinates: 33.2572°N 126.3524°E
- Interactive map of Andeok Valley

Korean name
- Hangul: 안덕계곡
- RR: Andeok gyegok
- MR: Andŏk kyegok

Andeok Valley (Korean: 안덕계곡), also called Andeokgyegok Valley, is a valley located in Andeok-myeon, Seogwipo, Jeju Province, South Korea.

The site has long been considered particularly beautiful. Visitors are able to descend into the valley and walk along the banks of the river Changgocheon.

The forest of the valley was designated Natural Monument of South Korea No. 377 in 1986.

== Gallery ==
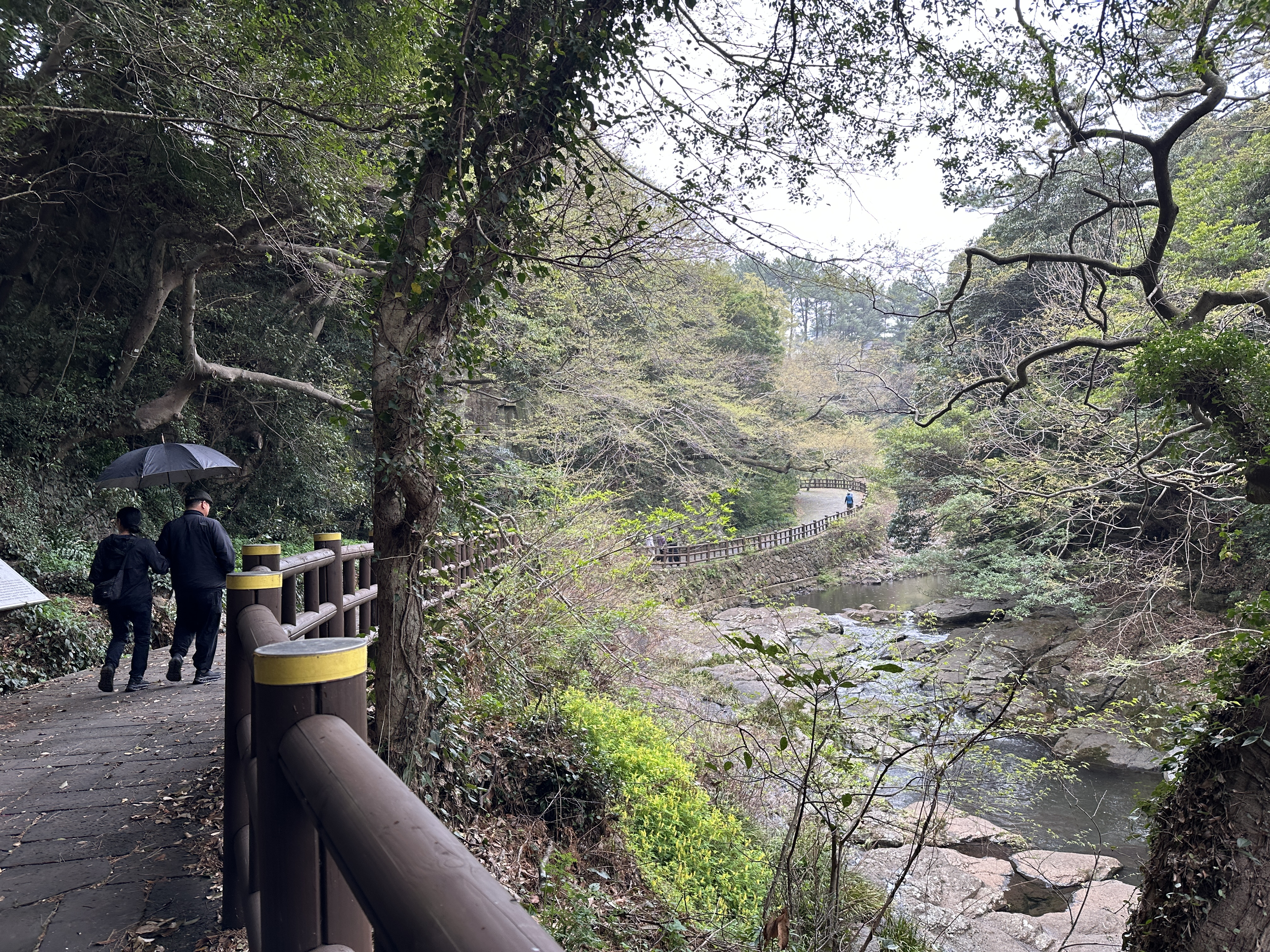

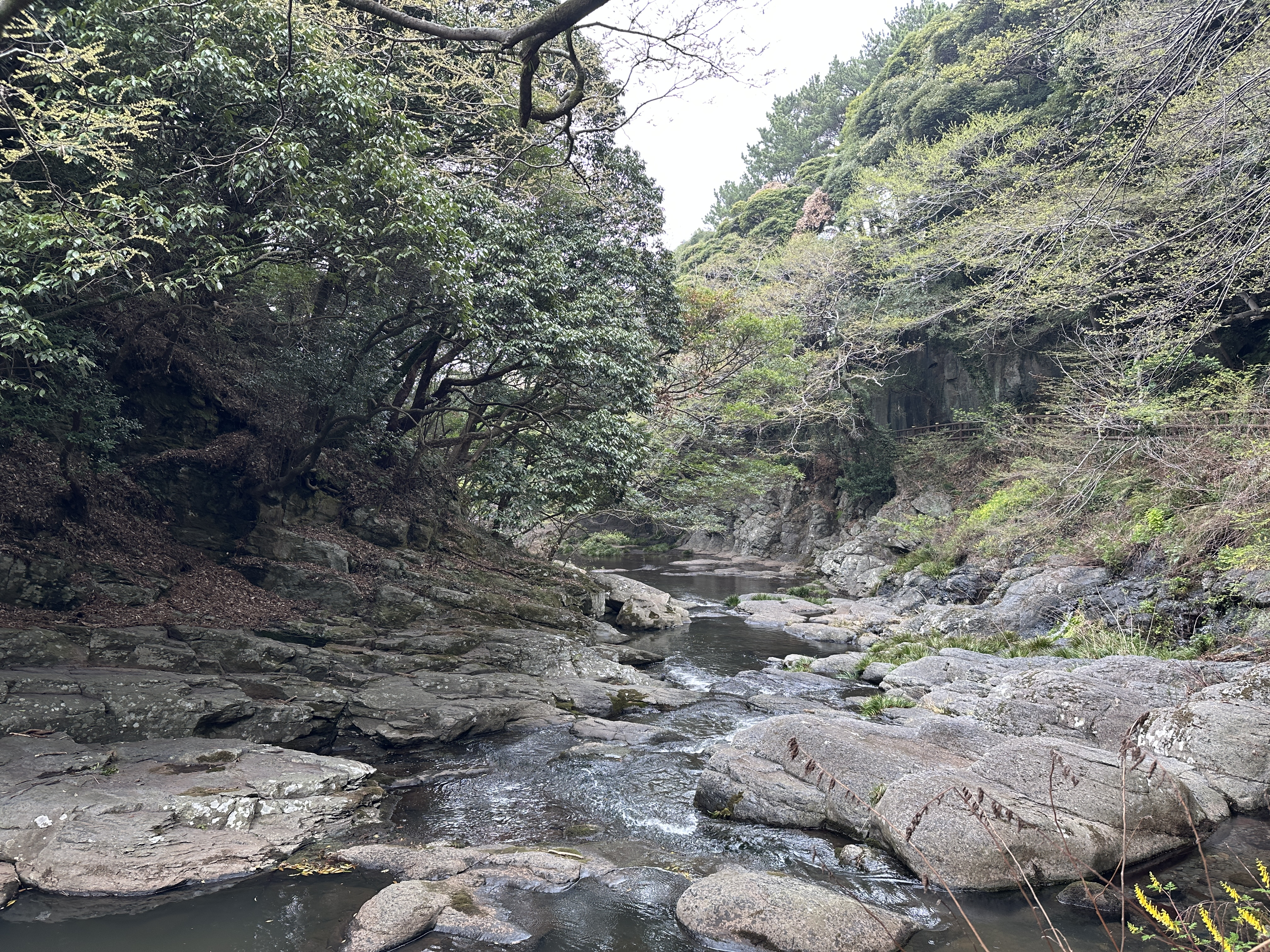
