= Jeongipumsong =

Tree in North Chungcheong, South Korea

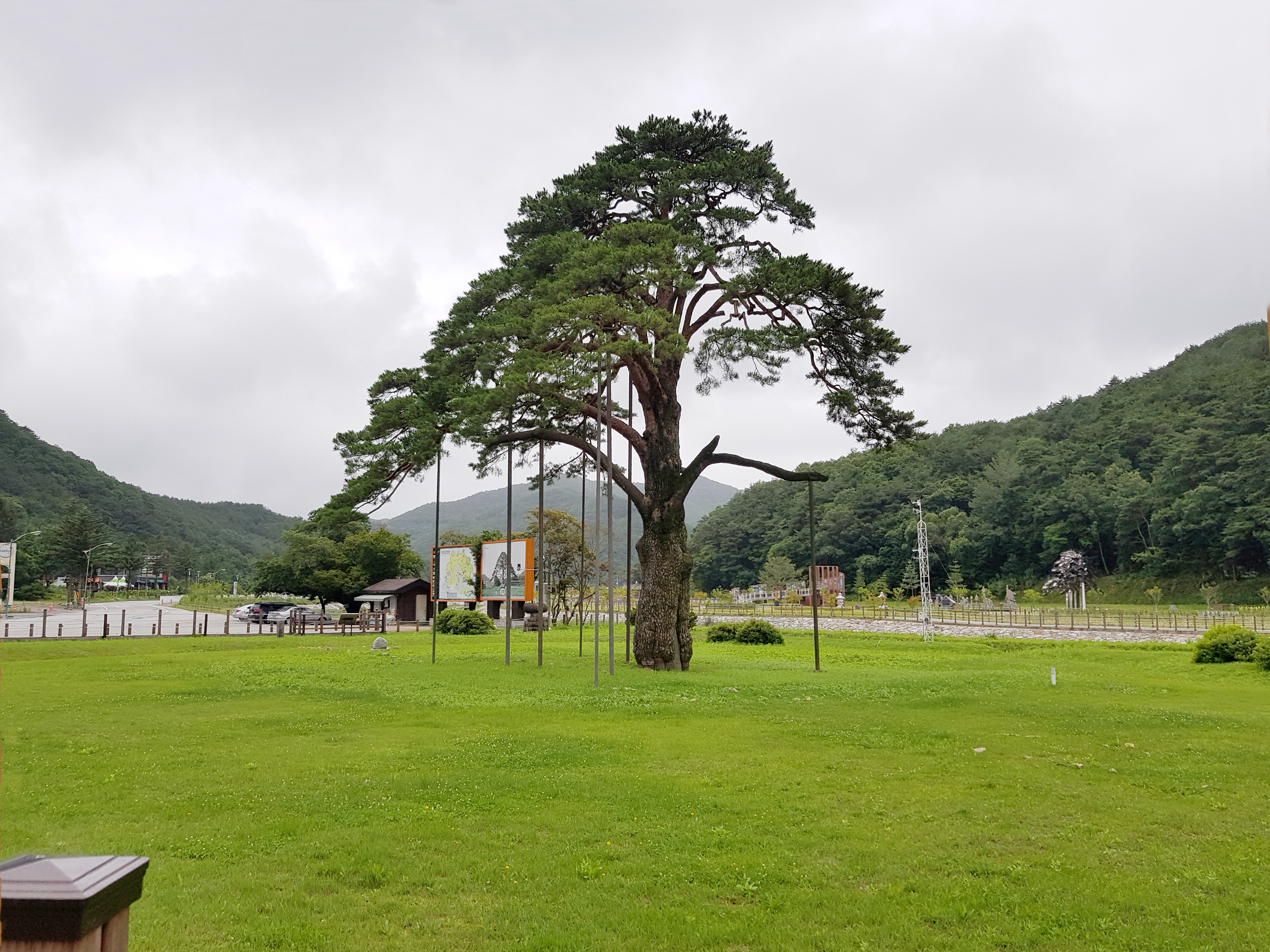
- The Jeongipumsong tree
- Interactive map of Jeongipumsong
- Native name: 정이품송 (Korean)
- Species: Pinus densiflora
- Location: Boeun County, Chungcheongbuk-do, South Korea
- Coordinates: 36°32′16.7″N 127°50′01.6″E
- Height: 15 metres (49 ft)

Jeongipumsong (Korean: 정이품송; Hanja: 正二品松) is a historically significant Korean red pine (Pinus densiflora) located at the foot of the mountain Songnisan in Boeun County, North Chungcheong Province, South Korea. Estimated to be around 600 years old, the tree is designated Natural Monument of South Korea No. 103 by the South Korean government. Its name translates to "Second Senior Rank Pine Tree", a ministerial title legendarily bestowed upon it by King Sejo of the Joseon dynasty in the 15th century.

== Etymology ==
The name Jeongipumsong (正二品松) means "Pine Tree of Senior Second Rank". Jeongipum (正二品) was a high government rank during the Joseon dynasty. It was held by officials such as government ministers. According to local legend, King Sejo gave the tree this rank after its branches rose to let his palanquin pass.

== Legend and history ==
According to a local legend, King Sejo visited Beopjusa Temple on Songnisan in 1464 to seek treatment for an illness. On his way to the temple, the king's palanquin came close to a large pine tree with low branches. When Sejo said that the branches might catch his palanquin, the tree raised them and let him pass. The king was pleased and gave the tree the rank of jeongipum (正二品), or senior second rank, the rank held by government ministers during the Joseon dynasty. The story also says that the tree sheltered Sejo from rain on his way home.

There is no record in the Veritable Records of the Joseon Dynasty of Sejo giving the tree an official rank. The story was passed down as a local legend and later recorded in the history of Boeun County.

The tree is thought to be about 600 years old. It is about 15 metres tall, with a trunk circumference of about 4.7 metres at breast height.

The tree was badly damaged by pine needle gall midges in the 1980s. Strong winds broke a large branch in February 1993, and more branches were lost to wind and snow in later years. On 10 August 2023, Typhoon Khanun broke two more branches. These losses have changed the tree's shape.

Jeongipumsong was designated Natural Monument No. 103 on 7 December 1962. It is protected by a fence, and Boeun County is responsible for its care.

Boeun County began growing young pine trees from Jeongipumsong's seeds in 2008. Some of its descendants have been planted elsewhere in South Korea. One was planted at the Blue House in April 2014.

== Jeongbuinsong ==
About 6 km (4 mi) away from Jeongipumsong, another ancient pine tree called "Jeongbuinsong" was designated as Natural Monument No. 352. It is considered the "wife" of the Jeongipumsong, and ceremonial "weddings" have been held to ritually pollinate the two trees.

== See also ==
- Cultural Heritage Administration of Korea
- Natural Monuments of South Korea
- King Sejo of Joseon
- Pinus densiflora
- Confucianism in Korea
