= Xenoxylon latiporosum =

Xenoxylon latiporosum Temporal range: Late Triassic–Cretaceous

Scientific classification
- Kingdom: Plantae
- Clade: Tracheophytes
- Clade: Gymnosperms
- Division: Pinophyta
- Class: Pinopsida
- Genus: †Xenoxylon
- Species: †X. latiporosum

Binomial name
- †Xenoxylon latiporosum (Cramer) Gothan

Synonyms
- Pinites latiporosus Cramer

Extinct species of conifer

Xenoxylon latiporosum is a fossil conifer, first described as Pinites latiporosus in 1868 by Carl Eduard Cramer, but this wood fossil species was transferred in 1905 to the newly described extinct plant fossil genus, Xenoxylon, by Walther Gothan. It is thought to be a conifer (in the class Pinopsida).

The Cretaceous fossil wood, Xenoxylon, is known from China, Japan, South Korea, Japan, Manchuria, Siberia, and many other northern hemisphere sites and corresponds to no modern plant. (Gothan says "The structure of this wood among the living and fossil gymnosperm woods is without analogue".)

Xenoxylon trees lived in a paleoclimate which was temperate to cool temperate, and in wet environments, and the presence of Xenoxylon is a marker of global climate change in the Mesozoic era.

Xenoxylon is distinguished from other conifer-like fossil genera by having "clusters of very flattened pits ... on radial tracheid walls", while Gothan's protologue describes Xenoxylon as "wood distinguished by the large oopores of the medullary rays and the very large areolate pits, which are uniseriate and strongly flattened on both sides because of the dense arrangement". The fossil genera Sciadopityoxylon Schmalhausen, and Trematoxylon Hartig are thought to be probable synonyms.

Xenoxylon latiporosum has very flattened radial pits (twice as wide as they are high).

Xenoxylon is known from the Mesozoic, and occurs from the Late Triassic to the Late Cretaceous.
