= Sinseong-ri Reed Field =

Wetland in South Korea

Sinseong-Ri Reed field
- Reed bed
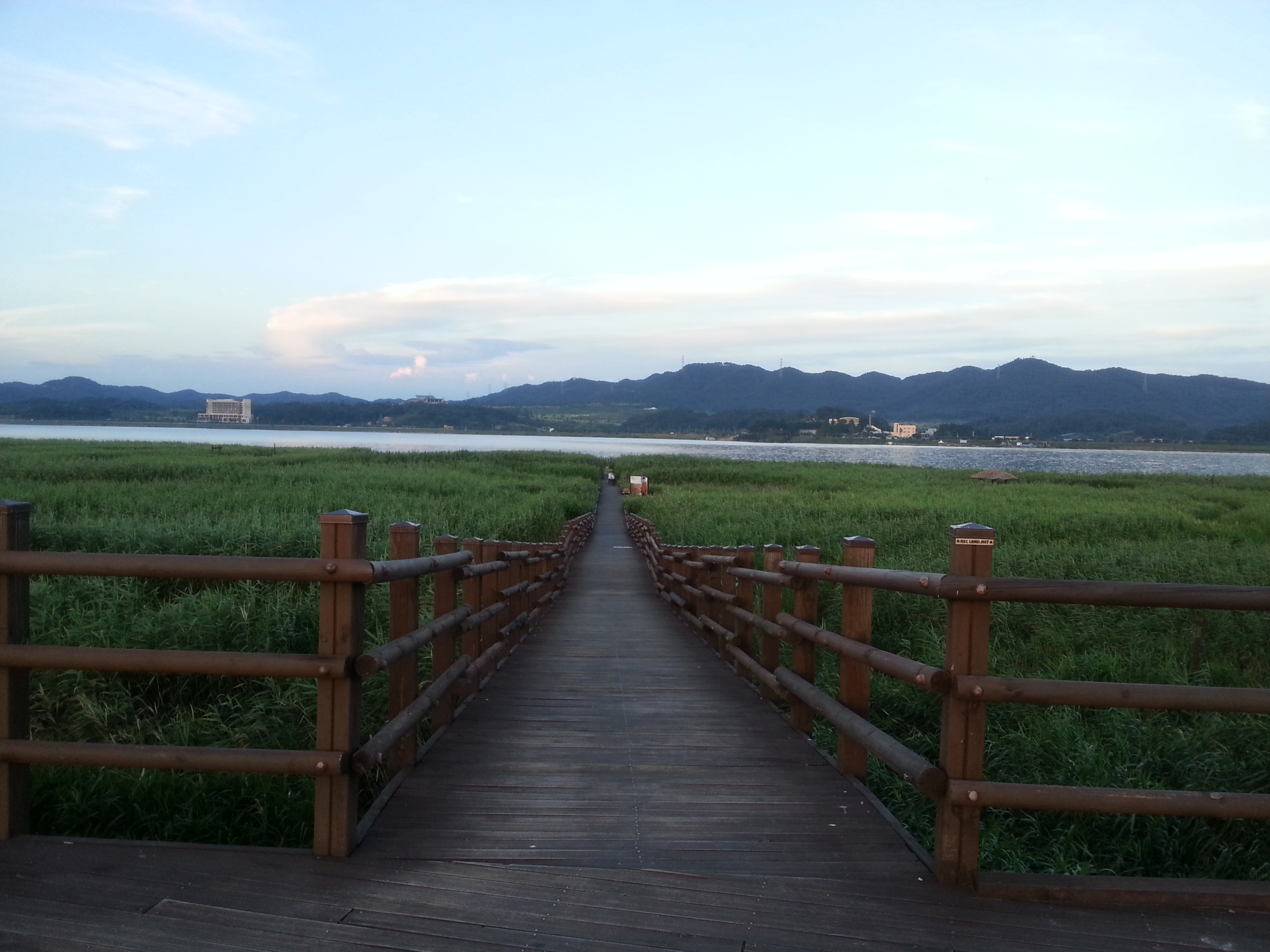

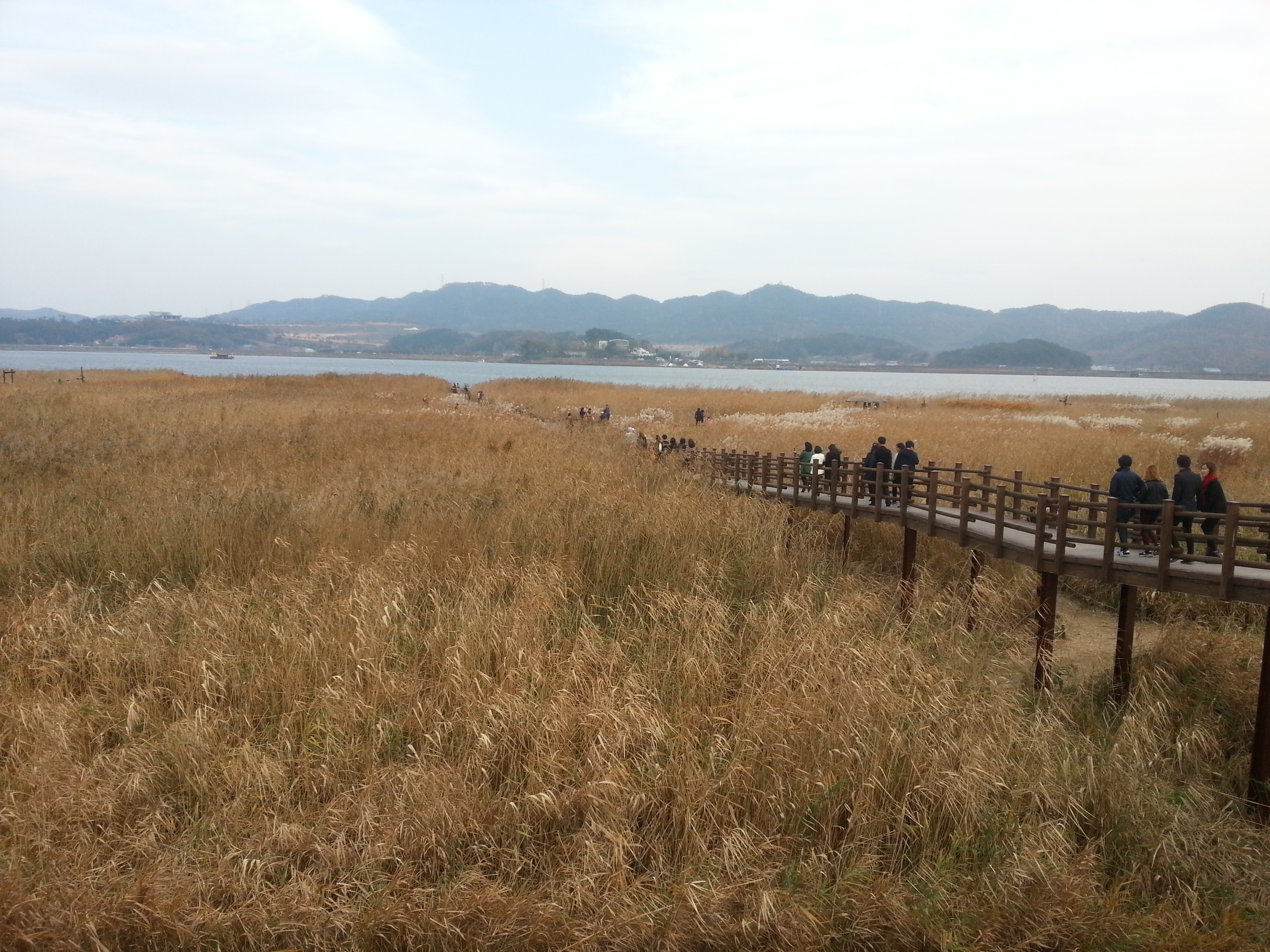
Sinseong-ri Reed Field in summer (top) and fall (bottom)
- Location: Seocheon, South Korea

Dimensions
  - Length: 1.5 km (4,900 ft)
  - Width: 0.2 km (660 ft)

The Sinseong-ri Reed Field (Korean: 신성리 갈대밭) is a reed bed located at the mouth of the Geum River where the cities Seocheon and Gunsan meet in South Korea.

== Geography ==
It is 200 meters wide, 1.5 kilometers long and 100,000 pyeong in size. It is one of the four largest reed beds in South Korea, along with Gocheon-amho (Haenam), Suncheon Bay (Suncheon) and Ansan reed marsh park (Ansan). It is the seventh typical reed habitat selected by the Korea Tourism Organization.

The area used to be called 'Gomgae Naru'. To preserve the reed beds, only about 3% of the total area offers walking trails and is accessible for public use. Every winter, from December to January, about 40 different species of winter birds visit, totaling approximately 100,000 birds.

== Popular culture ==
Reed Field often appears as a location for movies. It was used by Joint Security Area in 2000 and the drama Chu-no in 2010. On the reed beds trail, a log board contains poetry written by poets such as Park Doo-jin, Kim So-wol, Park Mok-wol and Ahn Do-hyun.

== Tourism ==
The Sinseong-ri Reed Field includes the Reed Experience Hall, which sells specialty products in Seocheon such as sokokju and mosi cake. Nearby are tourist attractions such as the Geumgang River estuary resort and the Hansan Mosi (Ramie Fabric) Exhibition Hall.

Reed Field is one of the Eight Scenic Spots of Seocheon (서천팔경; 舒川八景) along with Maryang-ri Camellia Forest (마량리 동백나무 숲), Geumgang Estuary Bird Sanctuary (금강 하굿둑 철새도래지), Hansan Mosi (Ramie Fabric) Village (한산 모시 마을), Chunjangdae Beach (춘장대 해수욕장), Munheonseowon Confucian School (문헌서원), Huirisan Recreational Forest (희리산 자연휴양림), Cheonbangsan Mountain (천방산).

Every October the Seocheon Moonlight Culture Reed Festival is held near the Sinseong-ri Reed Field. The festival's programs take place throughout the reeds and local specialty stores and specialty shops.

== See also ==
- Geum River
- Suncheon Bay
- Maryang-ri Camellia Forest
