= Seongnyugul Cave =

Cave in South Korea

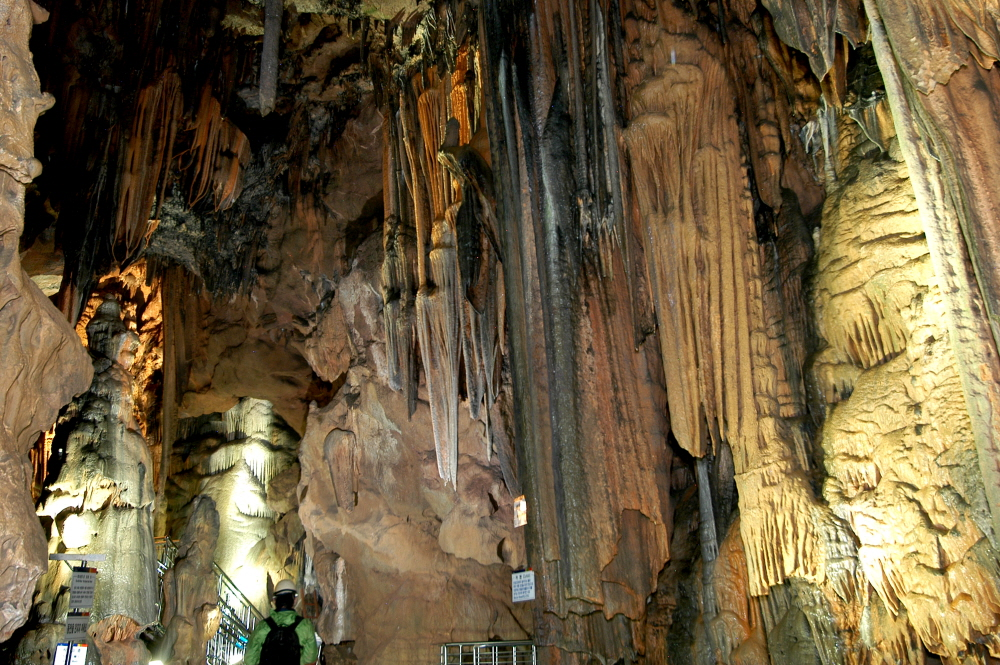

- Location within South Korea
- Location: Uljin, North Gyeongsang, South Korea
- Coordinates: 36°57′21.2015″N 129°22′44.6592″E
- Established: May 10, 1963
- Natural Monuments of South Korea

Seongnyugul Cave (Korean: 성류굴; Hanja: 聖留窟) is a limestone cave in Uljin, North Gyeongsang, South Korea, which was designated natural monument No 155 of South Korea on May 10, 1963.

It is also called Seonyugul (선유굴, 仙遊窟) and Jangcheongul (장천굴, 掌天窟). The name, Seongnyu (聖留), which means a place where sacred Buddhas stayed, and derives from the fact that Buddha statues were sheltered and protected in this cave during the Japanese invasion of Korea of 1592.

The length of the main cave is about 330 m, and the length remaining passage about 540 m, giving a total length of approximately 870 m, and has an area of 137,454 m^{2}. A lake is developing in the cave due to the flows of the Wangpicheon, a river next to the cave. Within the cave there are many stalactites, stalagmites, and stone pillars formed from their joins.

During the 1592 Japanese invasion, about 500 people took refuge in this cave, and it is said that the Japanese troops blocked the entrance, resulting in the deaths of all inside.

== Significance ==
The entrance of the cave has a stone engraved with a travelogue from the Silla Dynasty confirming that the cave has been a sacred place of scenic beauty since ancient times. Other historical materials about Seongnyugul Cave from various eras also attest its value: such as the story of Prince Bojildo (the Unified Silla period), a book (late Goryeo dynasty) a poem (early Joseon dynasty), and a painting (late Joseon).
