= Wenshan =

Wenshan (Chinese: 文山; pinyin: Wénshān) may refer to:

== China ==
- Wenshan Zhuang and Miao Autonomous Prefecture (文山壮族苗族自治州), Yunnan, PR China
- Wenshan City (文山市), the seat of the Wenshan Zhuang and Miao Autonomous Prefecture

== Taiwan ==
- Wenshan District (文山區), Taipei, Republic of China (Taiwan)
- Wenshan Line (Taipei Metro), railway line of Taipei Metro, Taiwan
- Vincent Fang (方文山; Fang Wenshan), a Taiwanese lyricist (born 1969)

== Indochina ==
- Wenshan (mountain), Annamite Range, Indochina; see List of Ultras of Southeast Asia

== See also ==
- 文山 (disambiguation) (Wénshān)
