= Munsan-myeon =

Myeon in Seocheon County, South Korea

Coordinates: 36.1421°N 126.75222°E

- Hangul: 문산면
- Hanja: 文山面
- RR: Munsan-myeon
- MR: Munsan-myŏn

Munsan-myeon (Korean: 문산면) is a myeon (township) in the northern part of Seocheon-gun, Chungcheongnam-do, South Korea. It is bordered by Masan-myeon to the east, Buyeo-gun's Oksan-myeon to the north, Pangyeon-myeon to the west, and Seocheon-eup's Sicho-myeon to the south. As of 2006 it had a population of 1,590.

Munsan-myeon was created in 1914 by the merger of Munjang-myeon (문장면, 文章面) and Dusan-myeon (두산면, 豆山面) in part of a wider reorganisation of Korea's administrative districts. It took taking one character from each of its parts to come up with the new name. Administratively subordinate to Munsan-myeon are eighteen ri (villages). Among these are:

- Sinnong-ri (신농리, 神農里)
- Geumbuk-ri (금복리, 金福里)
