= Seocheon County =

Coordinates: 36°04′49″N 126°41′29″E

Seocheon
- County
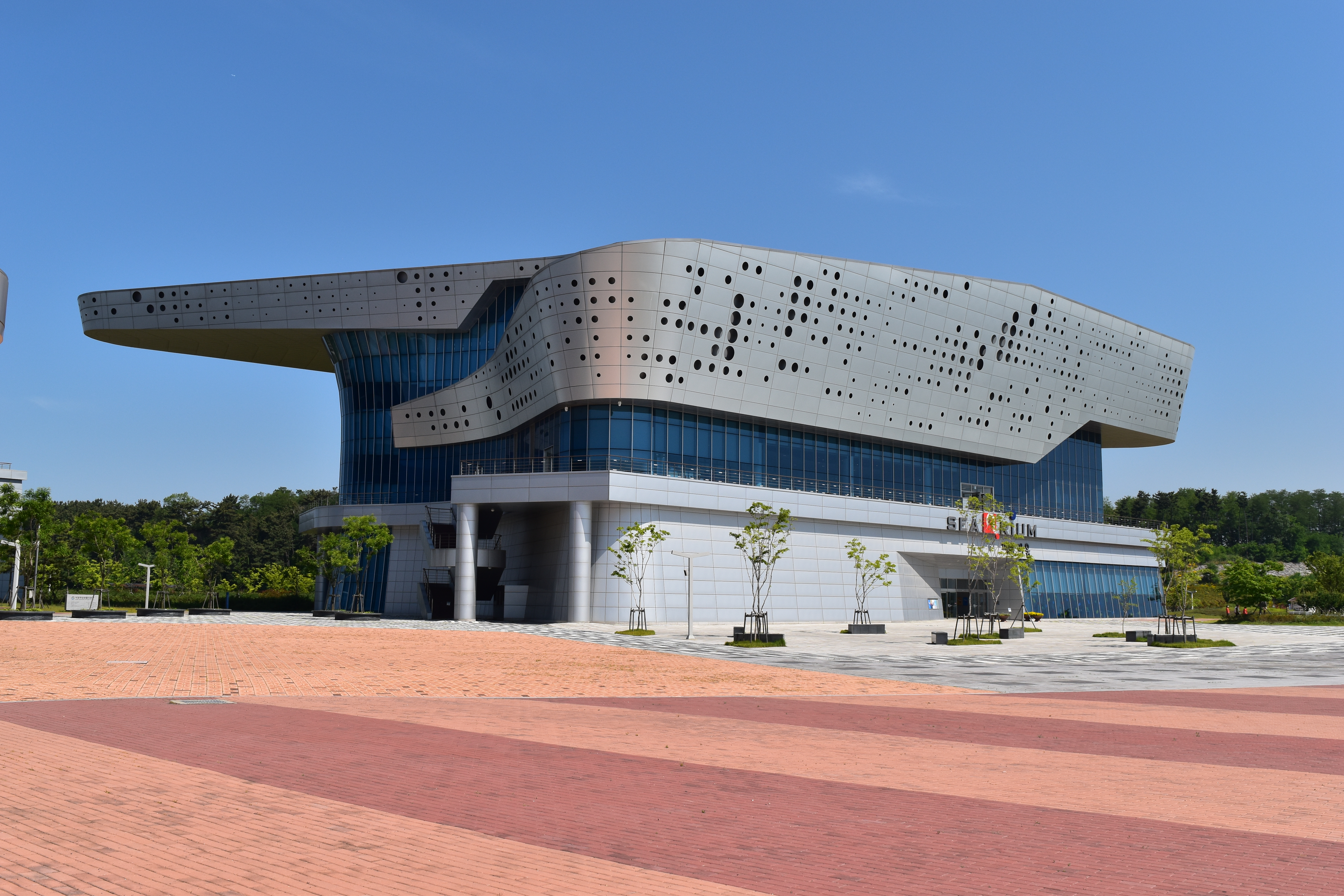
- Museum of National Marine Biodiversity Institute of Korea

- Flag Emblem of Seocheon

- Location in South Korea
- Country: South Korea
- Region: Hoseo
- Province: South Chungcheong
- Administrative divisions: 2 eup, 11 myeon

Area
  - Total: 363.40 km^{2} (140.31 sq mi)

Population (September 2024)
  - Total: 48,458
  - Density: 186.2/km^{2} (482/sq mi)
  - Dialect: Chungcheong

Korean name
- Hangul: 서천군
- Hanja: 舒川郡
- RR: Seocheon-gun
- MR: Sŏch'ŏn-gun

Seocheon County (Korean: 서천군; [sʌtɕʰʌnɡun]) is a county in Chungcheongnam-do, South Korea. It is famous for its seafood and location near the mouth of the Geum River.

== Administrative divisions ==
Seocheon county has two major centers, Janghang-eup and Seocheon-eup. Seocheon-eup, the larger center, serves as the educational center of the district. It has an economy built on agriculture and education. Janghang has a more industrial economy that includes factories, processing, and ship building. Janghang and Seocheon are connected to Yongsan (Seoul), Iksan, and the rest of the country via Korail's Janghang Line which formerly terminated in Janghang but has since been connected to Iksan via Gunsan.

In total under Seocheon-gun there are two eup and eleven myeon:

- Janghang-eup (장항읍/長項邑)
- Seocheon-eup (서천읍/舒川邑)
- Maseo-myeon (마서면/馬西面)
- Hwayang-myeon (화양면/華陽面)
- Gisan-myeon (기산면/麒山面)
- Hansan-myeon (한산면/韓山面)
- Masan-myeon (마산면/馬山面)
- Sicho-myeon (시초면/時草面)
- Munsan-myeon (문산면/文山面)
- Pangyo-myeon (판교면/板橋面)
- Jongcheon-myeon (종천면/鍾川面)
- Biin-myeon (비인면/庇仁面)
- Seo-myeon (서면/西面)

== Tourist spot ==
- 8 Scenic Spots of Seocheon
  - Maryang-ri Camellia Forest
  - Geumgang Estuary Bird Sanctuary
  - Hansan Mosi (Ramie Fabric) Village
  - Sinseong-ri Reed Field
  - Chunjangdae Beach
  - Munheonseowon Confucian School
  - Huirisan Recreational Forest
  - Cheonbangsan Mountain

== Festival ==
Hansan Mosi Culture Festival - Mosi (Ramie Fabric) is a traditional Korean natural fabric. It was selected as the 2018 Korea Promising Festival. 'Hansan mosi weaving' is designated as an intangible cultural heritage of UNESCO. At this festival, tourists can learn the history of Korean natural fibers and enjoy ramie clothes and crafts.

== Gallery ==
Dolmens

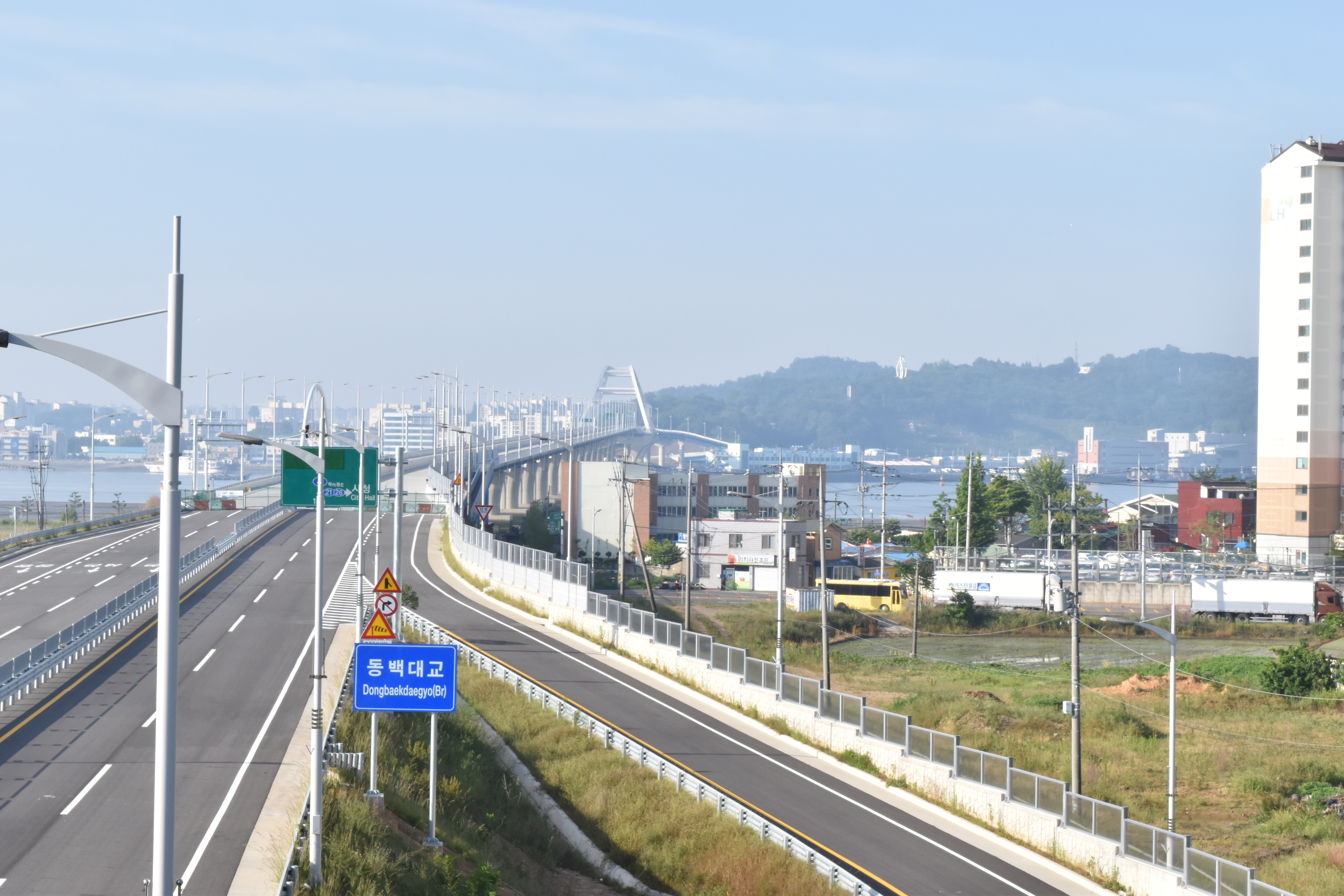
Dongbaek Bridge
