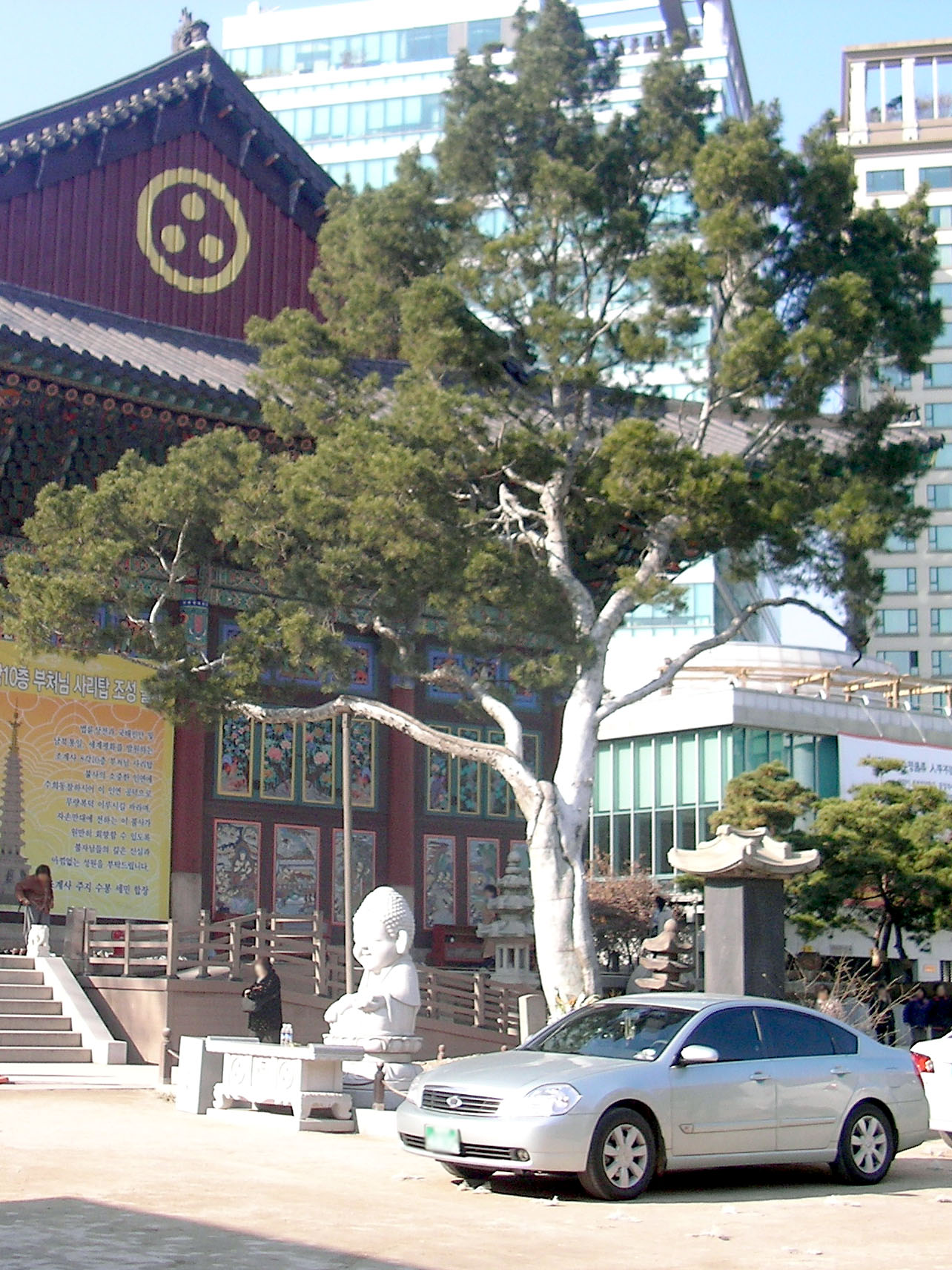
- Lacebark pine to the east of the Main Hall at Jogyesa (Buddhist Temple) in Seoul, South Korea

Conservation status
- Least Concern (IUCN 3.1)

Scientific classification
- Kingdom: Plantae
- Clade: Tracheophytes
- Clade: Gymnospermae
- Division: Pinophyta
- Class: Pinopsida
- Order: Pinales
- Family: Pinaceae
- Genus: Pinus
- Subgenus: P. subg. Strobus
- Section: P. sect. Quinquefoliae
- Subsection: P. subsect. Gerardianae
- Species: P. bungeana

Binomial name
- Pinus bungeana Zucc. ex Endl.

= Pinus bungeana =

Lacebark pine

Species of conifer

Pinus bungeana (Chinese: 白皮松; pinyin: báipísōng; Japanese: シロマツ; Korean: 백송; RR: baeksong), also known by the common names Bunge's pine, lacebark pine and white-barked pine, is a pine tree native to northeastern and central China. It is a slow-growing tree that can grow to heights of 15–25 metres (49–82 ft) is frost hardy down to below −26 °C (−15 °F). Its smooth, grey-green bark gradually sheds in round scales to reveal patches of pale yellow, which turn olive-brown, red and purple on exposure to light.

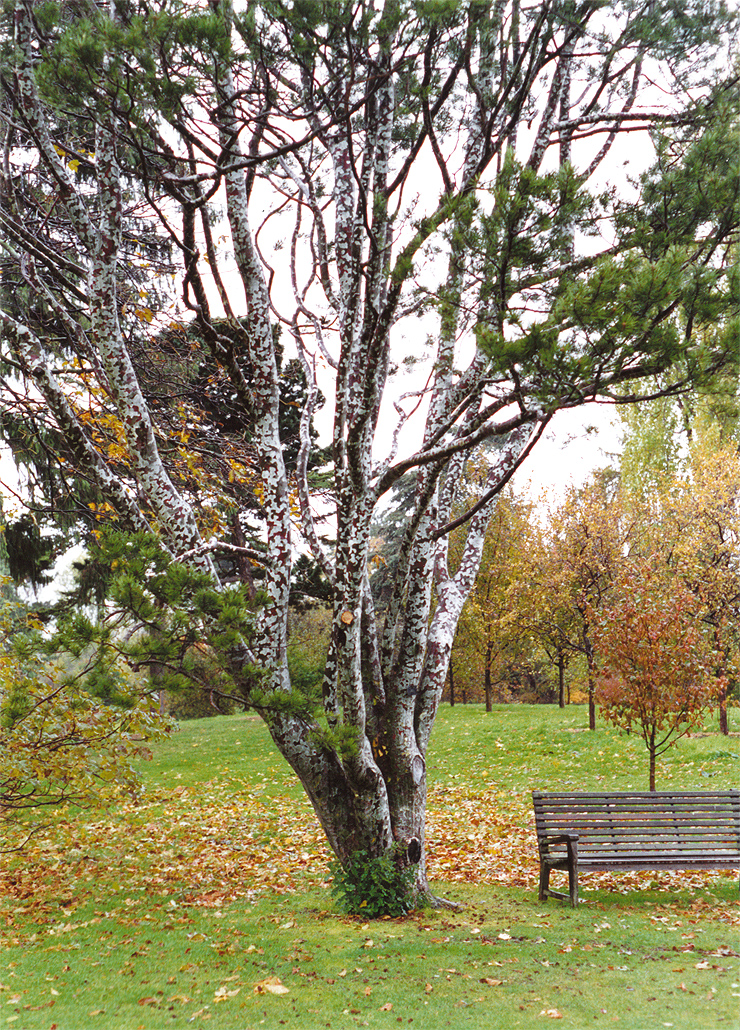
Lacebark pine at Kew Gardens, London, England

== Description ==
The lacebark pine's trunk can grow either monopodial, as a single growth upwards, or sympodial, forked. Its crown is loosely shaped like a pyramid or umbrella. It has 5–10 centimetres (2.0–3.9 in) long needles in groups of three. Each needles' cross-sections are shaped like a triangular semicircle. The lacebark pine produces cones that turn yellowish brown as they mature and are roughly egg-shaped and 5–7 centimetres (2.0–2.8 in) long. They contain seeds that are grey-brown, slightly egg-shaped, and 10 millimetres (0.39 in) long.

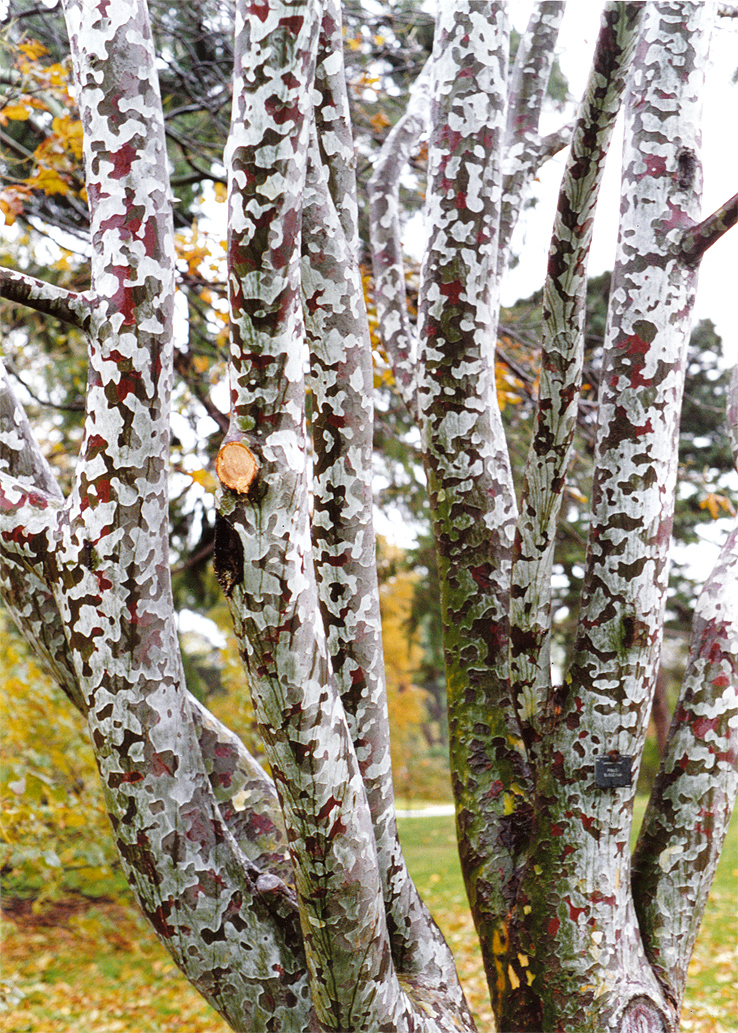
Closeup of multiple stems

== Taxonomy ==
P. bungeana is synonymous with the name Pinus excorticata, attributed to Lindley and Gordon in William Dallimore's Handbook of Coniferae and Ginkgoaceae. Its name is derived from the surname "Bunge", as one of its early identifications was by botanist Alexander von Bunge in 1831 near Beijing.

P. bungeana is closely related to Pinus gerardiana, another pine species with flaking bark, but P. bungeana has stiffer needles and smaller cones.

== Distribution and habitat ==
Pinus bungeana is native to temperate forests in the mountains of China, but it is also widely cultivated as an ornamental tree, especially for its metallic bark. It grows in the provinces of Shanxi, west Henan, south Gansu, south Hebei, north Sichuan, Shaanxi, west Shandong, and Hubei. It occurs in the wild on limestone rocks and south-facing slopes at relatively high elevations of 500–2,150 metres (1,640–7,050 ft), but has also been planted at lower elevations. In the northern portion of its range, it also occurs in acidic soil. As a light-demanding species, it usually grows in sites less suitable for other tree species.

It was introduced to England in 1843.

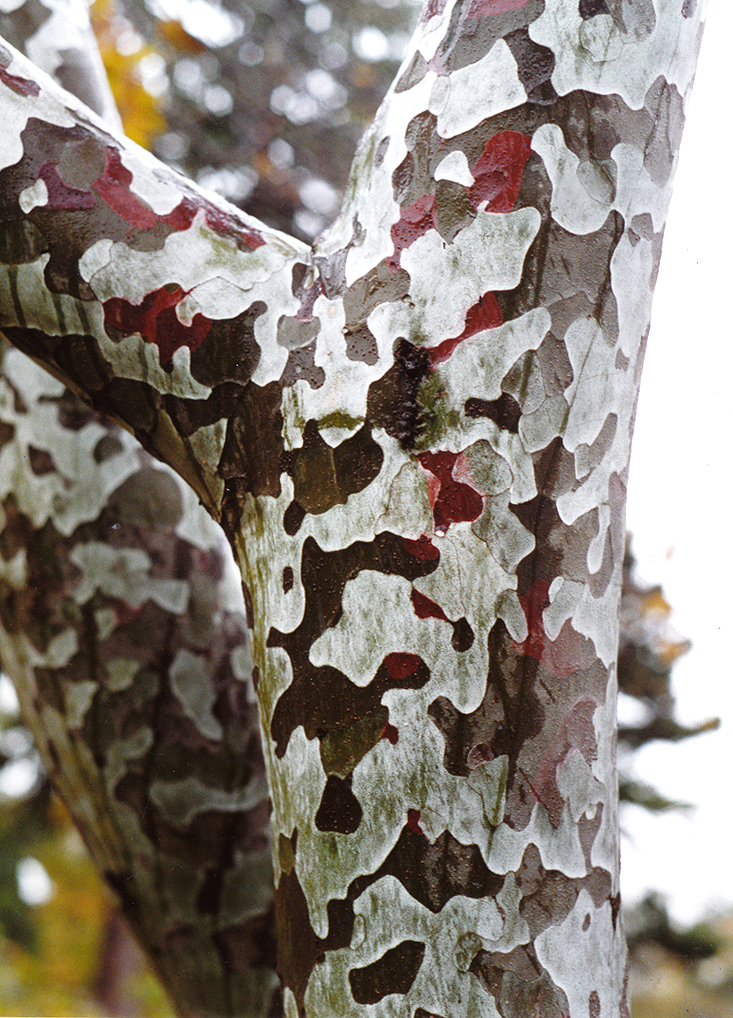
Closeup of bark

== Ecology ==
Pollination of the lacebark pine occurs in the months of April and May, while seeds mature in October and November of the second year.

== Uses ==
In China and Korea, the lacebark pine is traditionally planted near temples and cemeteries. It is also grown as an ornamental tree in classical gardens seeking to imitate Chinese gardens, in which it symbolizes longevity. It can also be seen in botanic gardens and often grows with multiple stems.

The wood of the lacebark pine is not commercially used as timber, but it is used locally by populations in northeast China for construction, furniture, and transport structures like pallets. The lacebark pine has edible seeds used in traditional Chinese medicine to provide relief for respiratory ailments.

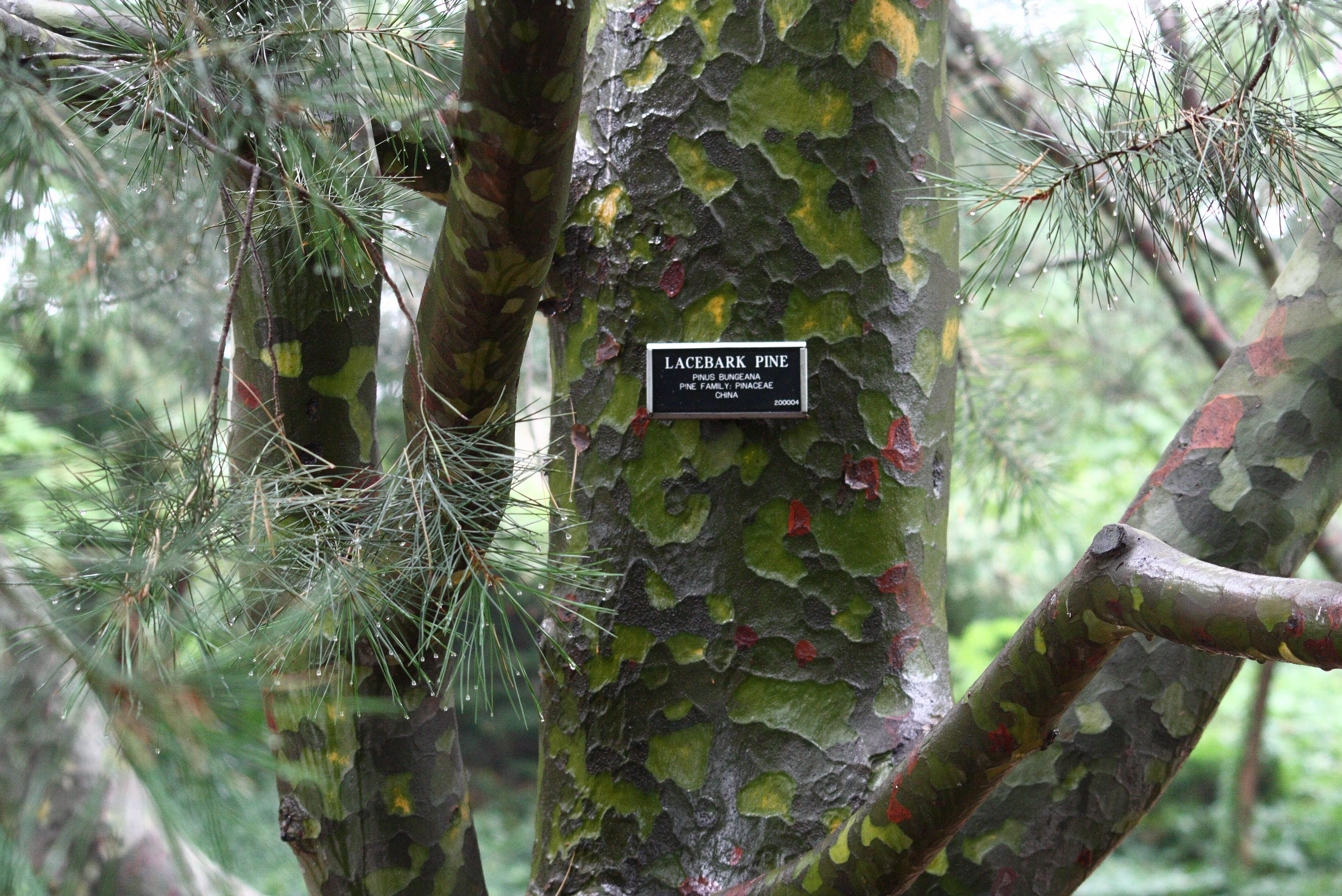
Bark and foliage

== Cultural significance ==
In 2009, P. bungeana was named the city tree of Baoji, China.
