= Carl Eduard Cramer (botanist) =

Swiss botanist

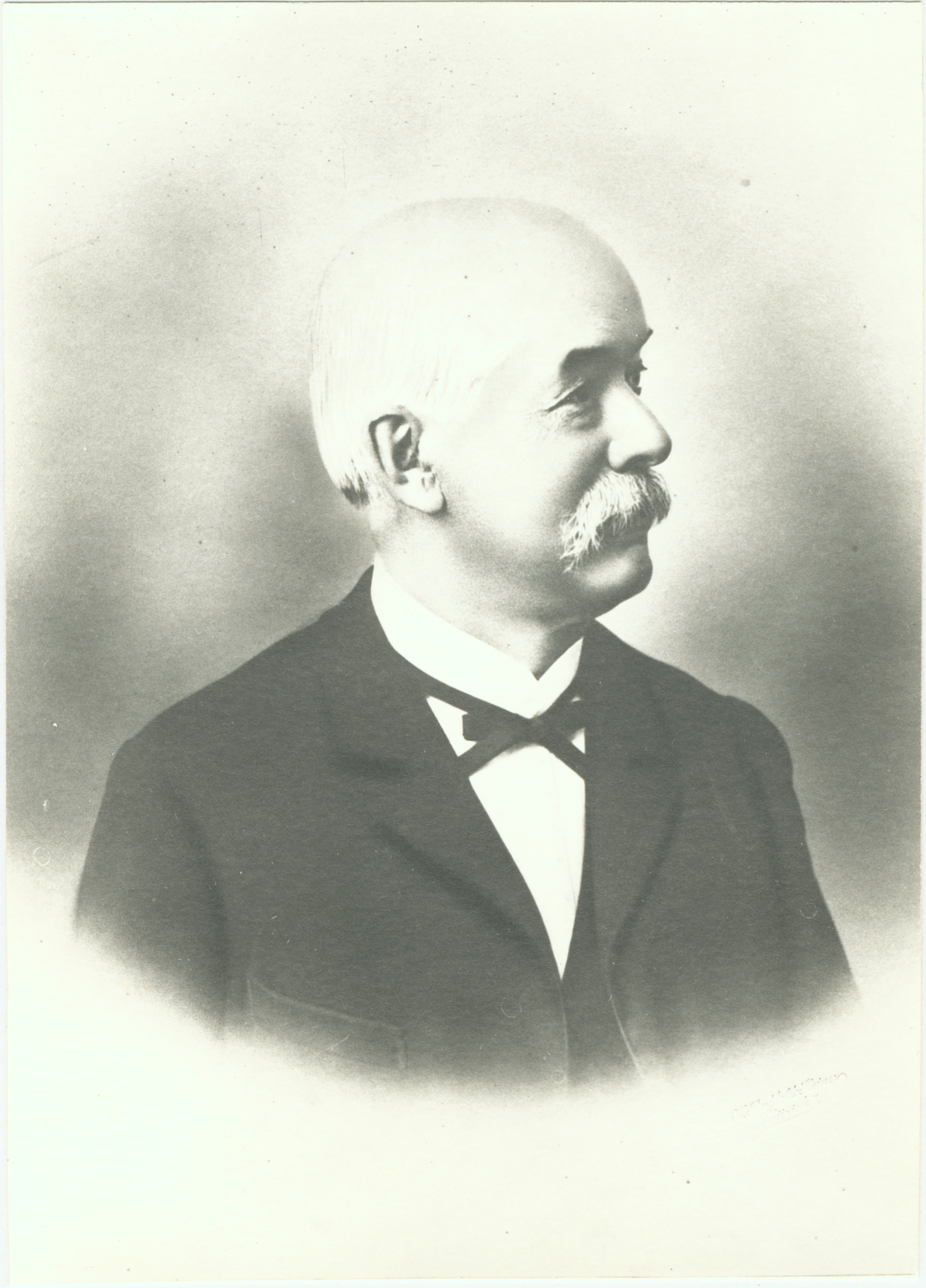
Portrait of Carl Cramer

Carl Eduard Cramer (4 March 1831 in Zürich – 24 November 1901 in Zürich) was a Swiss botanist.

He studied at the universities of Zürich and Freiburg, where he received his doctorate in 1855. As a young man his mentor was the famed botanist Carl Nägeli (1817–1891). He became a lecturer (1857) and later a professor of botany (1861–1901) at the Eidgenössische Technische Hochschule (Federal Polytechnic School) in Zurich. He also taught classes at the University of Zurich (1880–1883) and was director of its botanical garden from 1882 until 1893.

Cramer's specialty dealt with the physiology, genealogy and growth of plant cells. He did extensive research in the fields of bacteriology, plant teratology and cryptogamic botany. In his obituary, Carl Joseph Schröter referred to Cramer as the Altmeister botanischer Forschung ("Doyen of Botanical Research").

He was the author of a number of botanical works, including Pflanzenphysiologische Untersuchungen (4 volumes 1855–58), which he co-wrote with Karl von Nägeli.
