= Noejeongsan =

Mountain in South Korea

Highest point
- Elevation: 991 m (3,251 ft)
- Coordinates: 35.480°N 126.888°E

Geography
- Location: North Gyeongsang Province, South Korea

Noejeongsan is a mountain in the North Gyeongsang Province, eastern South Korea. It has an elevation of 991 m (3,251 ft).

== See also ==
- List of mountains in Korea
