= List of townships in South Korea =

A myeon (also spelt as myŏn, myon) or township is an administrative unit in South Korea; along with town (urban), a township (rural) is a division of a county and some cities of fewer than 500,000 population. Townships have smaller populations than towns and represent the rural areas of a county or city. Townships are subdivided into villages. The minimum population limit is 6,000.

== List of townships in South Korea ==
Town	Korean	Hanja	Provincial	Municipal	Area
Jinwi	진위면	振威面	Gyeonggi	Pyeongtaek	34.01
Seotan	서탄면	西炭面	Gyeonggi	Pyeongtaek	28.63
Godeok	고덕면	古德面	Gyeonggi	Pyeongtaek	35.06
Oseong	오성면	梧城面	Gyeonggi	Pyeongtaek	32.50
Cheongbuk	청북면	靑北面	Gyeonggi	Pyeongtaek	52.56
Hyeondeok	현덕면	玄德面	Gyeonggi	Pyeongtaek	45.89
Byeollae	별내면	別內面	Gyeonggi	Namyangju	22.17
Sudong	수동면	水洞面	Gyeonggi	Namyangju	72.74
Joan	조안면	鳥安面	Gyeonggi	Namyangju	50.70
Toegyewon	퇴계원면	退溪院面	Gyeonggi	Namyangju	3.26
Mohyeon	모현면	慕賢面	Gyeonggi	Yongin (Cheoin)	50.41
Namsa	남사면	南四面	Gyeonggi	Yongin (Cheoin)	58.64
Idong	이동면	二東面	Gyeonggi	Yongin (Cheoin)	75.64
Wonsam	원삼면	遠三面	Gyeonggi	Yongin (Cheoin)	60.23
Baegam	백암면	白巖面	Gyeonggi	Yongin (Cheoin)	65.79
Yangji	양지면	陽智面	Gyeonggi	Yongin (Cheoin)	57.71
Gwangtan	광탄면	廣灘面	Gyeonggi	Paju	65.51
Tanhyeon	탄현면	炭縣面	Gyeonggi	Paju	61.72
Wollong	월롱면	月籠面	Gyeonggi	Paju	27.14
Papyeong	파평면	坡平面	Gyeonggi	Paju	41.84
Jeokseong	적성면	積城面	Gyeonggi	Paju	88.83
Gunnae	군내면	郡內面	Gyeonggi	Paju	43.23
Jangdan	장단면	長湍面	Gyeonggi	Paju	33.96
Jindong	진동면	津東面	Gyeonggi	Paju	43.16
Jinseo	진서면	津西面	Gyeonggi	Paju	9.16
Daewol	대월면	大月面	Gyeonggi	Icheon	31.44
Majang	마장면	麻長面	Gyeonggi	Icheon	51.36
Baeksa	백사면	栢沙面	Gyeonggi	Icheon	32.55
Sindun	신둔면	新屯面	Gyeonggi	Icheon	36.46
Seolseong	설성면	雪星面	Gyeonggi	Icheon	51.66
Hobeop	호법면	戶法面	Gyeonggi	Icheon	37.93
Moga	모가면	暮加面	Gyeonggi	Icheon	40.99
Yul	율면	栗面	Gyeonggi	Icheon	36.77
Bogae	보개면	寶蓋面	Gyeonggi	Anseong	53.01
Geumgwang	금광면	金光面	Gyeonggi	Anseong	71.71
Seoun	서운면	瑞雲面	Gyeonggi	Anseong	36.28
Miyang	미양면	薇陽面	Gyeonggi	Anseong	33.73
Daedeok	대덕면	大德面	Gyeonggi	Anseong	31.16
Yangseong	양성면	陽城面	Gyeonggi	Anseong	53.17
Wongok	원곡면	元谷面	Gyeonggi	Anseong	37.83
Gosam	고삼면	古三面	Gyeonggi	Anseong	27.79
Iljuk	일죽면	一竹面	Gyeonggi	Anseong	55.54
Juksan	죽산면	竹山面	Gyeonggi	Anseong	57.26
Samjuk	삼죽면	三竹面	Gyeonggi	Anseong	39.07
Daegot	대곶면	大串面	Gyeonggi	Gimpo	42.79
Wolgot	월곶면	月串面	Gyeonggi	Gimpo	51.95
Haseong	하성면	霞城面	Gyeonggi	Gimpo	54.76
Maesong	매송면	梅松面	Gyeonggi	Hwaseong	27.40
Bibong	비봉면	飛鳳面	Gyeonggi	Hwaseong	38.5
Mado	마도면	麻道面	Gyeonggi	Hwaseong	31.8
Songsan	송산면	松山面	Gyeonggi	Hwaseong	53.63
Seosin	서신면	西新面	Gyeonggi	Hwaseong	43.1
Paltan	팔탄면	八灘面	Gyeonggi	Hwaseong	50.9
Jangan	장안면	長安面	Gyeonggi	Hwaseong	67.7
Yanggam	양감면	楊甘面	Gyeonggi	Hwaseong	31.1
Jeongnam	정남면	正南面	Gyeonggi	Hwaseong	40.7
Dongtan	동탄면	東灘面	Gyeonggi	Hwaseong	39.9
Docheok	도척면	都尺面	Gyeonggi	Gwangju	52.15
Toechon	퇴촌면	退村面	Gyeonggi	Gwangju	60.75
Namjong	남종면	南終面	Gyeonggi	Gwangju	48.57
Jungbu	중부면	中部面	Gyeonggi	Gwangju	33.73
Gwangjeok	광적면	廣積面	Gyeonggi	Yangju	48.49
Nam	남면	南面	Gyeonggi	Yangju	36.54
Jangheung	장흥면	長興面	Gyeonggi	Yangju	63.00
Eunhyeon	은현면	隱縣面	Gyeonggi	Yangju	34.54
Sinbuk	신북면	新北面	Gyeonggi	Pocheon	95.89
Idong	이동면	二東面	Gyeonggi	Pocheon	112.95
Gunnae	군내면	郡內面	Gyeonggi	Pocheon	55.46
Ildong	일동면	一東面	Gyeonggi	Pocheon	83.3
Gasan	가산면	加山面	Gyeonggi	Pocheon	35.89
Yeongjung	영중면	永中面	Gyeonggi	Pocheon	61.35
Yeongbuk	영북면	永北面	Gyeonggi	Pocheon	81.74
Naechon	내촌면	內村面	Gyeonggi	Pocheon	52.74
Gwanin	관인면	官仁面	Gyeonggi	Pocheon	69.71
Hwahyeon	화현면	花峴面	Gyeonggi	Pocheon	43.55
Changsu	창수면	蒼水面	Gyeonggi	Pocheon	71.5
Jeomdong	점동면	占東面	Gyeonggi	Yeoju	71.68
Neungseo	능서면	陵西面	Gyeonggi	Yeoju	53.13
Heungcheon	흥천면	興川面	Gyeonggi	Yeoju	44.22
Geumsa	금사면	金沙面	Gyeonggi	Yeoju	41.71
Sanbuk	산북면	山北面	Gyeonggi	Yeoju	32.86
Daesin	대신면	大神面	Gyeonggi	Yeoju	75.87
Bungnae	북내면	北內面	Gyeonggi	Yeoju	65.75
Gangcheon	강천면	康川面	Gyeonggi	Yeoju	74.05
Gunnam	군남면	郡南面	Gyeonggi	Yeoncheon County	45.62
Cheongsan	청산면	靑山面	Gyeonggi	Yeoncheon County	43.72
Baekhak	백학면	百鶴面	Gyeonggi	Yeoncheon County	61.27
Misan	미산면	嵋山面	Gyeonggi	Yeoncheon County	40.9
Wangjing	왕징면	旺澄面	Gyeonggi	Yeoncheon County	85.9
Sinseo	신서면	新西面	Gyeonggi	Yeoncheon County	131.81
Jung	중면	中面	Gyeonggi	Yeoncheon County	95.03
Jangnam	장남면	長南面	Gyeonggi	Yeoncheon County	56.17
Seorak	설악면	雪岳面	Gyeonggi	Gapyeong County	141.5
Cheongpyeong	청평면	淸平面	Gyeonggi	Gapyeong County	112.26
Sang	상면	上面	Gyeonggi	Gapyeong County	100.74
Ha	하면	下面	Gyeonggi	Gapyeong County	113.06
Buk	북면	北面	Gyeonggi	Gapyeong County	230.96
Gangsang	강상면	江上面	Gyeonggi	Yangpyeong County	37.91
Gangha	강하면	江下面	Gyeonggi	Yangpyeong County	31.4
Yangseo	양서면	楊西面	Gyeonggi	Yangpyeong County	59.95
Okcheon	옥천면	玉泉面	Gyeonggi	Yangpyeong County	65.85
Seojong	서종면	西宗面	Gyeonggi	Yangpyeong County	92.84
Danwol	단월면	丹月面	Gyeonggi	Yangpyeong County	107.94
Cheongun	청운면	靑雲面	Gyeonggi	Yangpyeong County	96.59
Yangdong	양동면	楊東面	Gyeonggi	Yangpyeong County	120.4
Jipyeong	지평면	砥平面	Gyeonggi	Yangpyeong County	77.79
Yongmun	용문면	龍門面	Gyeonggi	Yangpyeong County	102.24
Gaegun	개군면	介軍面	Gyeonggi	Yangpyeong County	32.45
Socho	소초면	所草面	Gangwon	Wonju	103.08
Hojeo	호저면	好楮面	Gangwon	Wonju	76.97
Jijeong	지정면	地正面	Gangwon	Wonju	89.70
Buron	부론면	富論面	Gangwon	Wonju	82.67
Gwirae	귀래면	貴來面	Gangwon	Wonju	76.55
Heungeop	흥업면	興業面	Gangwon	Wonju	59.59
Panbu	판부면	板富面	Gangwon	Wonju	67.72
Sillim	신림면	神林面	Gangwon	Wonju	127.41
Dong	동면	東面	Gangwon	Chuncheon	134.2
Dongsan	동산면	東山面	Gangwon	Chuncheon	80.81
Sindong	신동면	新東面	Gangwon	Chuncheon	48.19
Nam	남면	南面	Gangwon	Chuncheon	73.2
Seo	서면	西面	Gangwon	Chuncheon	141.64
Sabuk	사북면	史北面	Gangwon	Chuncheon	152.57
Buksan	북산면	北山面	Gangwon	Chuncheon	214.98
Dongnae	동내면	東內面	Gangwon	Chuncheon	36.62
Namsan	남산면	南山面	Gangwon	Chuncheon	124.11
Seongsan	성산면	城山面	Gangwon	Gangneung	80.28
Wangsan	왕산면	王山面	Gangwon	Gangneung	245.28
Gujeong	구정면	邱井面	Gangwon	Gangneung	42.72
Gangdong	강동면	江東面	Gangwon	Gangneung	112.48
Okgye	옥계면	玉溪面	Gangwon	Gangneung	148.83
Sacheon	사천면	沙川面	Gangwon	Gangneung	70.89
Yeongok	연곡면	連谷面	Gangwon	Gangneung	202.45
Geundeok	근덕면	近德面	Gangwon	Samcheok	133.41
Hajang	하장면	下長面	Gangwon	Samcheok	205.68
Nogok	노곡면	盧谷面	Gangwon	Samcheok	144.67
Miro	미로면	未老面	Gangwon	Samcheok	99.44
Gagok	가곡면	柯谷面	Gangwon	Samcheok	152.39
Singi	신기면	新基面	Gangwon	Samcheok	56.33
Hwachon	화촌면	化村面	Gangwon	Hongcheon County	211.36
Duchon	두촌면	斗村面	Gangwon	Hongcheon County	140.48
Naechon	내촌면	乃村面	Gangwon	Hongcheon County	146.72
Seoseok	서석면	瑞石面	Gangwon	Hongcheon County	225.46
Dong	동면	東面	Gangwon	Hongcheon County	149.63
Nam	남면	南面	Gangwon	Hongcheon County	120.34
Seo	서면	西面	Gangwon	Hongcheon County	123.39
Bukbang	북방면	北方面	Gangwon	Hongcheon County	146.44
Nae	내면	內面	Gangwon	Hongcheon County	447.95
Seo	서면	西面	Gangwon	Cheorwon County	74.33
Geunnam	근남면	近南面	Gangwon	Cheorwon County	129.13
Geunbuk	근북면	近北面	Gangwon	Cheorwon County	23.73
Geundong	근동면	近東面	Gangwon	Cheorwon County	19.71
Wonnam	원남면	遠南面	Gangwon	Cheorwon County	77.99
Wondong	원동면	遠東面	Gangwon	Cheorwon County	61.08
Imnam	임남면	任南面	Gangwon	Cheorwon County	16.79
Ucheon	우천면	隅川面	Gangwon	Hoengseong County	94.80
Anheung	안흥면	安興面	Gangwon	Hoengseong County	96.35
Dunnae	둔내면	屯內面	Gangwon	Hoengseong County	128.04
Gapcheon	갑천면	甲川面	Gangwon	Hoengseong County	123.35
Cheongil	청일면	晴日面	Gangwon	Hoengseong County	133.63
Gonggeun	공근면	公根面	Gangwon	Hoengseong County	129.3
Seowon	서원면	書院面	Gangwon	Hoengseong County	123.43
Gangnim	강림면	講林面	Gangwon	Hoengseong County	96.37
Mitan	미탄면	美灘面	Gangwon	Pyeongchang County	109.43
Bangnim	방림면	芳林面	Gangwon	Pyeongchang County	120.85
Daehwa	대화면	大和面	Gangwon	Pyeongchang County	166.6
Bongpyeong	봉평면	蓬坪面	Gangwon	Pyeongchang County	217.41
Yongpyeong	용평면	龍坪面	Gangwon	Pyeongchang County	135.43
Jinbu	진부면	珍富面	Gangwon	Pyeongchang County	331.06
Daegwallyeong	대관령면	大關嶺面	Gangwon	Pyeongchang County	221.63
Hwaam	화암면	畫巖面	Gangwon	Jeongseon County	135.1
Nam	남면	南面	Gangwon	Jeongseon County	130.93
Yeoryang	여량면	餘糧面	Gangwon	Jeongseon County	136.19
Bukpyeong	북평면	北坪面	Gangwon	Jeongseon County	140.76
Imgye	임계면	臨溪面	Gangwon	Jeongseon County	243.53
Suju	수주면	水周面	Gangwon	Yeongwol County	153.37
Jucheon	주천면	酒泉面	Gangwon	Yeongwol County	102.51
Hanbando	한반도면	韓半島面	Gangwon	Yeongwol County	69.87
Buk	북면	北面	Gangwon	Yeongwol County	111.34
Nam	남면	南面	Gangwon	Yeongwol County	82.18
Gimsatgat	김삿갓면	金삿갓面	Gangwon	Yeongwol County	171.5
Jungdong	중동면	中東面	Gangwon	Yeongwol County	124.77
Nam	남면	南面	Gangwon	Inje County	243.24
Buk	북면	北面	Gangwon	Inje County	349.06
Girin	기린면	麒麟面	Gangwon	Inje County	275.09
Seohwa	서화면	瑞和面	Gangwon	Inje County	265.37
Sangnam	상남면	上南面	Gangwon	Inje County	197.54
Sudong	수동면	水洞面	Gangwon	Goseong County	144.09
Jugwang	죽왕면	竹旺面	Gangwon	Goseong County	50.11
Toseong	토성면	土城面	Gangwon	Goseong County	120.46
Hyeonnae	현내면	縣內面	Gangwon	Goseong County	92.72
Seo	서면	西面	Gangwon	Yangyang County	268.06
Sonyang	손양면	巽陽面	Gangwon	Yangyang County	47.32
Hyeonbuk	현북면	縣北面	Gangwon	Yangyang County	164.47
Hyeonnam	현남면	縣南面	Gangwon	Yangyang County	64.34
Ganghyeon	강현면	降峴面	Gangwon	Yangyang County	52.78
Gandong	간동면	看東面	Gangwon	Hwacheon County	128.12
Hanam	하남면	下南面	Gangwon	Hwacheon County	118.47
Sangseo	상서면	上西面	Gangwon	Hwacheon County	219.09
Sanae	사내면	史內面	Gangwon	Hwacheon County	151.14
Nam	남면	南面	Gangwon	Yanggu County	135.26
Dong	동면	東面	Gangwon	Yanggu County	123.62
Bangsan	방산면	方山面	Gangwon	Yanggu County	206.7
Haean	해안면	亥安面	Gangwon	Yanggu County	61.52
Nangseong	낭성면	琅城面	North Chungcheong	Cheongju (Sangdang)	59.58
Miwon	미원면	米院面	North Chungcheong	Cheongju (Sangdang)	129.64
Gadeok	가덕면	加德面	North Chungcheong	Cheongju (Sangdang)	49.80
Namil	남일면	南一面	North Chungcheong	Cheongju (Sangdang)	35.18
Munui	문의면	文義面	North Chungcheong	Cheongju (Sangdang)	93.30
Nami	남이면	南二面	North Chungcheong	Cheongju (Seowon)	48.84
Hyeondo	현도면	賢都面	North Chungcheong	Cheongju (Seowon)	43.47
Gangnae	강내면	江內面	North Chungcheong	Cheongju (Heungdeok)	29.99
Oksan	옥산면	玉山面	North Chungcheong	Cheongju (Heungdeok)	65.49
Bugi	북이면	北二面	North Chungcheong	Cheongju (Cheongwon)	47.46
Salmi	살미면	乷味面	North Chungcheong	Chungju	91.60
Suanbo	수안보면	水安堡面	North Chungcheong	Chungju	73.40
Daesowon	대소원면	大召院面	North Chungcheong	Chungju	61.90
Sinni	신니면	新尼面	North Chungcheong	Chungju	59.80
Noeun	노은면	老隱面	North Chungcheong	Chungju	61.80
Angseong	앙성면	仰城面	North Chungcheong	Chungju	100.30
Jungangtap	중앙탑면	中央塔面	North Chungcheong	Chungju	48.10
Geumga	금가면	金加面	North Chungcheong	Chungju	33.80
Dongnyang	동량면	東良面	North Chungcheong	Chungju	109.40
Sancheok	산척면	山尺面	North Chungcheong	Chungju	78.40
Eomjeong	엄정면	嚴政面	North Chungcheong	Chungju	56.50
Sotae	소태면	蘇台面	North Chungcheong	Chungju	63.00
Geumseong	금성면	錦城面	North Chungcheong	Jecheon	68.48
Cheongpung	청풍면	淸風面	North Chungcheong	Jecheon	91.75
Susan	수산면	水山面	North Chungcheong	Jecheon	88.89
Deoksan	덕산면	德山面	North Chungcheong	Jecheon	111.51
Hansu	한수면	寒水面	North Chungcheong	Jecheon	75.37
Baegun	백운면	白雲面	North Chungcheong	Jecheon	135.14
Songhak	송학면	松鶴面	North Chungcheong	Jecheon	72.69
Songnisan	속리산면	俗離山面	North Chungcheong	Boeun County	92.15
Jangan	장안면	長安面	North Chungcheong	Boeun County	29.86
Maro	마로면	馬老面	North Chungcheong	Boeun County	68.46
Tanbu	탄부면	炭釜面	North Chungcheong	Boeun County	31.61
Samseung	삼승면	三升面	North Chungcheong	Boeun County	28.28
Suhan	수한면	水汗面	North Chungcheong	Boeun County	48.73
Hoenam	회남면	懷南面	North Chungcheong	Boeun County	46.45
Hoein	회인면	懷仁面	North Chungcheong	Boeun County	54.04
Naebuk	내북면	內北面	North Chungcheong	Boeun County	63.45
Sanoe	산외면	山外面	North Chungcheong	Boeun County	58.69
Dongi	동이면	東二面	North Chungcheong	Okcheon County	60.19
Annam	안남면	安南面	North Chungcheong	Okcheon County	31.78
Annae	안내면	安內面	North Chungcheong	Okcheon County	64.32
Cheongseong	청성면	靑城面	North Chungcheong	Okcheon County	82.90
Cheongsan	청산면	靑山面	North Chungcheong	Okcheon County	72.47
Iwon	이원면	伊院面	North Chungcheong	Okcheon County	66.33
Gunseo	군서면	郡西面	North Chungcheong	Okcheon County	45.94
Gunbuk	군북면	郡北面	North Chungcheong	Okcheon County	65.59
Yongsan	용산면	龍山面	North Chungcheong	Yeongdong County	66.89
Hwanggan	황간면	黃澗面	North Chungcheong	Yeongdong County	90.30
Chupungnyeong	추풍령면	秋風嶺面	North Chungcheong	Yeongdong County	55.22
Maegok	매곡면	梅谷面	North Chungcheong	Yeongdong County	45.19
Sangchon	상촌면	上村面	North Chungcheong	Yeongdong County	137.59
Yanggang	양강면	陽江面	North Chungcheong	Yeongdong County	82.00
Yonghwa	용화면	龍化面	North Chungcheong	Yeongdong County	59.39
Haksan	학산면	鶴山面	North Chungcheong	Yeongdong County	73.50
Yangsan	양산면	陽山面	North Chungcheong	Yeongdong County	57.12
Simcheon	심천면	深川面	North Chungcheong	Yeongdong County	77.82
Doan	도안면	道安面	North Chungcheong	Jeungpyeong County	26.43
Deoksan	덕산면	德山面	North Chungcheong	Jincheon County	35.02
Chopyeong	초평면	草坪面	North Chungcheong	Jincheon County	76.29
Munbaek	문백면	文白面	North Chungcheong	Jincheon County	60.18
Baekgok	백곡면	栢谷面	North Chungcheong	Jincheon County	80.09
Iwol	이월면	梨月面	North Chungcheong	Jincheon County	55.20
Gwanghyewon	광혜원면	廣惠院面	North Chungcheong	Jincheon County	29.80
Gammul	감물면	甘勿面	North Chungcheong	Goesan County	42.77
Jangyeon	장연면	長延面	North Chungcheong	Goesan County	61.37
Yeonpung	연풍면	延豊面	North Chungcheong	Goesan County	93.26
Chilseong	칠성면	七星面	North Chungcheong	Goesan County	101.49
Mungwang	문광면	文光面	North Chungcheong	Goesan County	56.02
Cheongcheon	청천면	靑川面	North Chungcheong	Goesan County	208.94
Cheongan	청안면	淸安面	North Chungcheong	Goesan County	70.88
Sari	사리면	沙梨面	North Chungcheong	Goesan County	50.62
Sosu	소수면	沼壽面	North Chungcheong	Goesan County	46.55
Buljeong	불정면	佛頂面	North Chungcheong	Goesan County	60.54
Soi	소이면	蘇伊面	North Chungcheong	Eumseong County	48.90
Wonnam	원남면	遠南面	North Chungcheong	Eumseong County	64.77
Maengdong	맹동면	孟洞面	North Chungcheong	Eumseong County	34.69
Daeso	대소면	大所面	North Chungcheong	Eumseong County	38.17
Samseong	삼성면	三成面	North Chungcheong	Eumseong County	50.59
Saenggeuk	생극면	笙極面	North Chungcheong	Eumseong County	56.04
Gamgok	감곡면	甘谷面	North Chungcheong	Eumseong County	69.48
Daegang	대강면	大崗面	North Chungcheong	Danyang County	134.36
Gagok	가곡면	佳谷面	North Chungcheong	Danyang County	104.49
Yeongchun	영춘면	永春面	North Chungcheong	Danyang County	181.68
Eosangcheon	어상천면	魚上川面	North Chungcheong	Danyang County	73.32
Jeokseong	적성면	赤城面	North Chungcheong	Danyang County	72.27
Danseong	단성면	丹城面	North Chungcheong	Danyang County	73.05
Pungse	풍세면	豊歲面	South Chungcheong	Cheonan (Dongnam)	30.25
Gwangdeok	광덕면	廣德面	South Chungcheong	Cheonan (Dongnam)	80.50
Buk	북면	北面	South Chungcheong	Cheonan (Dongnam)	58.56
Seongnam	성남면	城南面	South Chungcheong	Cheonan (Dongnam)	33.01
Susin	수신면	修身面	South Chungcheong	Cheonan (Dongnam)	25.89
Byeongcheon	병천면	竝川面	South Chungcheong	Cheonan (Dongnam)	56.39
Dong	동면	東面	South Chungcheong	Cheonan (Dongnam)	43.25
Ipjang	입장면	笠長面	South Chungcheong	Cheonan (Seobuk)	42.73
Iin	이인면	利仁面	South Chungcheong	Gongju	62.95
Tancheon	탄천면	灘川面	South Chungcheong	Gongju	64.15
Gyeryong	계룡면	鷄龍面	South Chungcheong	Gongju	84.08
Banpo	반포면	反浦面	South Chungcheong	Gongju	78.04
Uidang	의당면	儀堂面	South Chungcheong	Gongju	65.69
Jeongan	정안면	正安面	South Chungcheong	Gongju	108.96
Useong	우성면	牛城面	South Chungcheong	Gongju	79.54
Sagok	사곡면	寺谷面	South Chungcheong	Gongju	80.13
Sinpung	신풍면	新豊面	South Chungcheong	Gongju	80.47
Jupo	주포면	周浦面	South Chungcheong	Boryeong	13.34
Jugyo	주교면	舟橋面	South Chungcheong	Boryeong	36.32
Ocheon	오천면	鰲川面	South Chungcheong	Boryeong	50.42
Cheonbuk	천북면	川北面	South Chungcheong	Boryeong	55.17
Cheongso	청소면	靑所面	South Chungcheong	Boryeong	38.45
Cheongna	청라면	靑蘿面	South Chungcheong	Boryeong	69.82
Nampo	남포면	藍浦面	South Chungcheong	Boryeong	49.44
Jusan	주산면	珠山面	South Chungcheong	Boryeong	40.93
Misan	미산면	嵋山面	South Chungcheong	Boryeong	65.53
Seongju	성주면	聖住面	South Chungcheong	Boryeong	39.79
Songak	송악면	松岳面	South Chungcheong	Asan	61.20
Tangjeong	탕정면	湯井面	South Chungcheong	Asan	24.21
Eumbong	음봉면	陰峰面	South Chungcheong	Asan	59.02
Dunpo	둔포면	屯浦面	South Chungcheong	Asan	41.22
Yeongin	영인면	靈仁面	South Chungcheong	Asan	56.28
Inju	인주면	仁州面	South Chungcheong	Asan	44.98
Seonjang	선장면	仙掌面	South Chungcheong	Asan	37.66
Dogo	도고면	道高面	South Chungcheong	Asan	43.84
Sinchang	신창면	新昌面	South Chungcheong	Asan	39.69
Inji	인지면	仁旨面	South Chungcheong	Seosan	35.48
Buseok	부석면	浮石面	South Chungcheong	Seosan	123.85
Palbong	팔봉면	八峰面	South Chungcheong	Seosan	51.36
Jigok	지곡면	地谷面	South Chungcheong	Seosan	57.92
Seongyeon	성연면	聖淵面	South Chungcheong	Seosan	43.92
Eumam	음암면	音岩面	South Chungcheong	Seosan	43.95
Unsan	운산면	雲山面	South Chungcheong	Seosan	82.67
Haemi	해미면	海美面	South Chungcheong	Seosan	68.27
Gobuk	고북면	高北面	South Chungcheong	Seosan	71.76
Seongdong	성동면	城東面	South Chungcheong	Nonsan	35.58
Gwangseok	광석면	光石面	South Chungcheong	Nonsan	34.02
Noseong	노성면	魯城面	South Chungcheong	Nonsan	35.78
Sangwol	상월면	上月面	South Chungcheong	Nonsan	44.78
Bujeok	부적면	夫赤面	South Chungcheong	Nonsan	30.72
Yeonsan	연산면	連山面	South Chungcheong	Nonsan	55.00
Beolgok	벌곡면	伐谷面	South Chungcheong	Nonsan	69.71
Yangchon	양촌면	陽村面	South Chungcheong	Nonsan	77.21
Gayagok	가야곡면	可也谷面	South Chungcheong	Nonsan	45.30
Eunjin	은진면	恩津面	South Chungcheong	Nonsan	22.53
Chaeun	채운면	彩雲面	South Chungcheong	Nonsan	19.75
Duma	두마면	豆磨面	South Chungcheong	Gyeryong	12.58
Eomsa	엄사면	奄寺面	South Chungcheong	Gyeryong	17.91
Sindoan	신도안면	新都案面	South Chungcheong	Gyeryong	27.37
Godae	고대면	高大面	South Chungcheong	Dangjin	65.35
Seongmun	석문면	石門面	South Chungcheong	Dangjin	94.27
Daehoji	대호지면	大湖芝面	South Chungcheong	Dangjin	65.85
Jeongmi	정미면	貞美面	South Chungcheong	Dangjin	49.58
Myeoncheon	면천면	沔川面	South Chungcheong	Dangjin	39.24
Sunseong	순성면	順城面	South Chungcheong	Dangjin	44.39
Ugang	우강면	牛江面	South Chungcheong	Dangjin	38.86
Sinpyeong	신평면	新平面	South Chungcheong	Dangjin	54.32
Songsan	송산면	松山面	South Chungcheong	Dangjin	62.57
Geumseong	금성면	錦城面	South Chungcheong	Geumsan County	34.80
Jewon	제원면	濟原面	South Chungcheong	Geumsan County	64.30
Buri	부리면	富利面	South Chungcheong	Geumsan County	66.40
Gunbuk	군북면	郡北面	South Chungcheong	Geumsan County	58.10
Namil	남일면	南一面	South Chungcheong	Geumsan County	47.10
Nami	남이면	南二面	South Chungcheong	Geumsan County	98.20
Jinsan	진산면	珍山面	South Chungcheong	Geumsan County	80.50
Boksu	복수면	福壽面	South Chungcheong	Geumsan County	56.20
Chubu	추부면	秋富面	South Chungcheong	Geumsan County	49.10
Gyuam	규암면	窺岩面	South Chungcheong	Buyeo County	46.58
Eunsan	은산면	恩山面	South Chungcheong	Buyeo County	69.45
Oesan	외산면	外山面	South Chungcheong	Buyeo County	56.02
Naesan	내산면	內山面	South Chungcheong	Buyeo County	40.45
Guryong	구룡면	九龍面	South Chungcheong	Buyeo County	21.86
Hongsan	홍산면	鴻山面	South Chungcheong	Buyeo County	23.90
Oksan	옥산면	玉山面	South Chungcheong	Buyeo County	25.39
Nam	남면	南面	South Chungcheong	Buyeo County	20.99
Chunghwa	충화면	忠化面	South Chungcheong	Buyeo County	37.10
Yanghwa	양화면	良花面	South Chungcheong	Buyeo County	32.77
Imcheon	임천면	林川面	South Chungcheong	Buyeo County	43.15
Jangam	장암면	場岩面	South Chungcheong	Buyeo County	47.69
Sedo	세도면	世道面	South Chungcheong	Buyeo County	41.92
Seokseong	석성면	石城面	South Chungcheong	Buyeo County	30.58
Chochon	초촌면	草村面	South Chungcheong	Buyeo County	27.97
Maseo	마서면	馬西面	South Chungcheong	Seocheon County	38.15
Hwayang	화양면	華陽面	South Chungcheong	Seocheon County	31.58
Gisan	기산면	麒山面	South Chungcheong	Seocheon County	20.98
Hansan	한산면	韓山面	South Chungcheong	Seocheon County	25.02
Masan	마산면	馬山面	South Chungcheong	Seocheon County	26.36
Sicho	시초면	時草面	South Chungcheong	Seocheon County	18.39
Munsan	문산면	文山面	South Chungcheong	Seocheon County	28.19
Pangyo	판교면	板橋面	South Chungcheong	Seocheon County	40.03
Jongcheon	종천면	鍾川面	South Chungcheong	Seocheon County	26.06
Biin	비인면	庇仁面	South Chungcheong	Seocheon County	31.33
Seo	서면	西面	South Chungcheong	Seocheon County	25.35
Ungok	운곡면	雲谷面	South Chungcheong	Cheongyang County	47.00
Daechi	대치면	大峙面	South Chungcheong	Cheongyang County	74.40
Jeongsan	정산면	定山面	South Chungcheong	Cheongyang County	62.10
Mok	목면	木面	South Chungcheong	Cheongyang County	34.40
Cheongnam	청남면	青南面	South Chungcheong	Cheongyang County	35.10
Jangpyeong	장평면	長坪面	South Chungcheong	Cheongyang County	50.70
Namyang	남양면	南陽面	South Chungcheong	Cheongyang County	58.90
Hwaseong	화성면	化城面	South Chungcheong	Cheongyang County	42.60
Bibong	비봉면	飛鳳面	South Chungcheong	Cheongyang County	38.00
Hongbuk	홍북면	洪北面	South Chungcheong	Hongseong County	44.66
Geumma	금마면	金馬面	South Chungcheong	Hongseong County	34.16
Hongdong	홍동면	洪東面	South Chungcheong	Hongseong County	37.99
Janggok	장곡면	長谷面	South Chungcheong	Hongseong County	54.92
Eunha	은하면	銀河面	South Chungcheong	Hongseong County	30.89
Gyeolseong	결성면	結城面	South Chungcheong	Hongseong County	29.15
Seobu	서부면	西部面	South Chungcheong	Hongseong County	55.55
Galsan	갈산면	葛山面	South Chungcheong	Hongseong County	54.35
Guhang	구항면	龜項面	South Chungcheong	Hongseong County	36.80
Daesul	대술면	大述面	South Chungcheong	Yesan County	60.70
Sinyang	신양면	新陽面	South Chungcheong	Yesan County	61.70
Gwangsi	광시면	光時面	South Chungcheong	Yesan County	58.00
Daeheung	대흥면	大興面	South Chungcheong	Yesan County	5.80
Eungbong	응봉면	鷹峰面	South Chungcheong	Yesan County	26.30
Deoksan	덕산면	德山面	South Chungcheong	Yesan County	59.70
Bongsan	봉산면	鳳山面	South Chungcheong	Yesan County	35.20
Godeok	고덕면	古德面	South Chungcheong	Yesan County	44.90
Sinam	신암면	新岩面	South Chungcheong	Yesan County	35.90
Oga	오가면	吾可面	South Chungcheong	Yesan County	32.30
Gonam	고남면	古南面	South Chungcheong	Taean County	27.80
Nam	남면	南面	South Chungcheong	Taean County	60.65
Geunheung	근흥면	近興面	South Chungcheong	Taean County	52.97
Sowon	소원면	所遠面	South Chungcheong	Taean County	69.36
Wonbuk	원북면	遠北面	South Chungcheong	Taean County	74.14
Iwon	이원면	梨園面	South Chungcheong	Taean County	40.95
Singwang	신광면	神光面	North Gyeongsang	Pohang (Buk)	80.17
Cheongha	청하면	淸河面	North Gyeongsang	Pohang (Buk)	78.20
Songna	송라면	松羅面	North Gyeongsang	Pohang (Buk)	59.40
Gigye	기계면	杞溪面	North Gyeongsang	Pohang (Buk)	91.96
Jukjang	죽장면	竹長面	North Gyeongsang	Pohang (Buk)	235.71
Gibuk	기북면	杞北面	North Gyeongsang	Pohang (Buk)	52.390
Daesong	대송면	大松面	North Gyeongsang	Pohang (Nam)	32.62
Donghae	동해면	東海面	North Gyeongsang	Pohang (Nam)	43.62
Janggi	장기면	長鬐面	North Gyeongsang	Pohang (Nam)	100.27
Homigot	호미곶면	虎尾串面	North Gyeongsang	Pohang (Nam)	20.43
Munmudaewang	문무대왕면	文武大王面	North Gyeongsang	Gyeongju	120.06
Yangnam	양남면	陽南面	North Gyeongsang	Gyeongju	84.95
Naenam	내남면	內南面	North Gyeongsang	Gyeongju	122.03
Sannae	산내면	山內面	North Gyeongsang	Gyeongju	143.03
Seo	서면	西面	North Gyeongsang	Gyeongju	52.13
Hyeongok	현곡면	見谷面	North Gyeongsang	Gyeongju	55.78
Gangdong	강동면	江東面	North Gyeongsang	Gyeongju	81.48
Cheonbuk	천북면	川北面	North Gyeongsang	Gyeongju	58.21
Nongso	농소면	農所面	North Gyeongsang	Gimcheon	45.70
Nam	남면	南面	North Gyeongsang	Gimcheon	70.60
Gaeryeong	개령면	開寧面	North Gyeongsang	Gimcheon	27.80
Gammun	감문면	甘文面	North Gyeongsang	Gimcheon	59.40
Eomo	어모면	禦侮面	North Gyeongsang	Gimcheon	65.30
Bongsan	봉산면	鳳山面	North Gyeongsang	Gimcheon	56.50
Daehang	대항면	代項面	North Gyeongsang	Gimcheon	66.10
Gamcheon	감천면	甘川面	North Gyeongsang	Gimcheon	27.50
Joma	조마면	助馬面	North Gyeongsang	Gimcheon	70.90
Guseong	구성면	龜城面	North Gyeongsang	Gimcheon	95.50
Jirye	지례면	知禮面	North Gyeongsang	Gimcheon	54.20
Buhang	부항면	釜項面	North Gyeongsang	Gimcheon	82.70
Daedeok	대덕면	大德面	North Gyeongsang	Gimcheon	98.40
Jeungsan	증산면	甑山面	North Gyeongsang	Gimcheon	7.520
Waryong	와룡면	臥龍面	North Gyeongsang	Andong	116.99
Bukhu	북후면	北後面	North Gyeongsang	Andong	76.86
Seohu	서후면	西後面	North Gyeongsang	Andong	65.35
Pungcheon	풍천면	豊川面	North Gyeongsang	Andong	93.89
Iljik	일직면	一直面	North Gyeongsang	Andong	85.55
Namhu	남후면	南後面	North Gyeongsang	Andong	63.15
Namseon	남선면	南先面	North Gyeongsang	Andong	59.20
Imha	임하면	臨河面	North Gyeongsang	Andong	91.70
Giran	길안면	吉安面	North Gyeongsang	Andong	200.05
Imdong	임동면	臨東面	North Gyeongsang	Andong	151.07
Yean	예안면	禮安面	North Gyeongsang	Andong	163.92
Dosan	도산면	陶山面	North Gyeongsang	Andong	101.91
Nokjeon	녹전면	祿轉面	North Gyeongsang	Andong	70.84
Dogae	도개면	桃開面	North Gyeongsang	Gumi	60.90
Jangcheon	장천면	長川面	North Gyeongsang	Gumi	58.14
Mueul	무을면	舞乙面	North Gyeongsang	Gumi	44.67
Haepyeong	해평면	海平面	North Gyeongsang	Gumi	69.21
Sandong	산동면	山東面	North Gyeongsang	Gumi	59.33
Okseong	옥성면	玉城面	North Gyeongsang	Gumi	66.65
Isan	이산면	伊山面	North Gyeongsang	Yeongju	53.24
Pyeongeun	평은면	平恩面	North Gyeongsang	Yeongju	62.18
Munsu	문수면	文殊面	North Gyeongsang	Yeongju	41.25
Jangsu	장수면	長壽面	North Gyeongsang	Yeongju	42.06
Anjeong	안정면	安定面	North Gyeongsang	Yeongju	43.69
Bonghyeon	봉현면	鳳峴面	North Gyeongsang	Yeongju	51.93
Sunheung	순흥면	順興面	North Gyeongsang	Yeongju	54.35
Dansan	단산면	丹山面	North Gyeongsang	Yeongju	92.20
Buseok	부석면	浮石面	North Gyeongsang	Yeongju	91.68
Cheongtong	청통면	淸通面	North Gyeongsang	Yeongcheon	67.26
Sinnyeong	신녕면	新寧面	North Gyeongsang	Yeongcheon	81.09
Hwasan	화산면	花山面	North Gyeongsang	Yeongcheon	53.48
Hwabuk	화북면	華北面	North Gyeongsang	Yeongcheon	87.26
Hwanam	화남면	華南面	North Gyeongsang	Yeongcheon	79.34
Jayang	자양면	紫陽面	North Gyeongsang	Yeongcheon	89.44
Imgo	임고면	臨皐面	North Gyeongsang	Yeongcheon	88.15
Gogyeong	고경면	古鏡面	North Gyeongsang	Yeongcheon	120.57
Bugan	북안면	北安面	North Gyeongsang	Yeongcheon	71.19
Daechang	대창면	大昌面	North Gyeongsang	Yeongcheon	50.93
Sabeol	사벌면	沙伐面	North Gyeongsang	Sangju	51.69
Jungdong	중동면	中東面	North Gyeongsang	Sangju	57.37
Nakdong	낙동면	洛東面	North Gyeongsang	Sangju	91.10
Cheongni	청리면	靑里面	North Gyeongsang	Sangju	39.59
Gongseong	공성면	功城面	North Gyeongsang	Sangju	89.29
Oenam	외남면	外南面	North Gyeongsang	Sangju	33.22
Naeseo	내서면	內西面	North Gyeongsang	Sangju	80.66
Modong	모동면	牟東面	North Gyeongsang	Sangju	70.50
Moseo	모서면	牟西面	North Gyeongsang	Sangju	84.98
Hwadong	화동면	化東面	North Gyeongsang	Sangju	56.10
Hwaseo	화서면	化西面	North Gyeongsang	Sangju	59.51
Hwabuk	화북면	化北面	North Gyeongsang	Sangju	99.41
Oeseo	외서면	外西面	North Gyeongsang	Sangju	88.08
Euncheok	은척면	銀尺面	North Gyeongsang	Sangju	53.95
Gonggeom	공검면	恭儉面	North Gyeongsang	Sangju	39.50
Ian	이안면	利安面	North Gyeongsang	Sangju	52.35
Hwanam	화남면	化南面	North Gyeongsang	Sangju	54.39
Yeongsun	영순면	泳順面	North Gyeongsang	Mungyeong	38.54
Sanyang	산양면	山陽面	North Gyeongsang	Mungyeong	32.65
Hogye	호계면	虎溪面	North Gyeongsang	Mungyeong	53.25
Sanbuk	산북면	山北面	North Gyeongsang	Mungyeong	111.21
Dongno	동로면	東魯面	North Gyeongsang	Mungyeong	15.6
Maseong	마성면	麻城面	North Gyeongsang	Mungyeong	74.77
Nongam	농암면	籠巖面	North Gyeongsang	Mungyeong	103.46
Wachon	와촌면	瓦村面	North Gyeongsang	Gyeongsan	47.90
Jain	자인면	慈仁面	North Gyeongsang	Gyeongsan	22.05
Yongseong	용성면	龍城面	North Gyeongsang	Gyeongsan	79.40
Namsan	남산면	南山面	North Gyeongsang	Gyeongsan	38.17
Amnyang	압량면	押梁面	North Gyeongsang	Gyeongsan	18.35
Namcheon	남천면	南川面	North Gyeongsang	Gyeongsan	70.53
Sobo	소보면	召保面	North Gyeongsang	Gunwi County	101.31
Hyoryeong	효령면	孝令面	North Gyeongsang	Gunwi County	98.49
Bugye	부계면	缶溪面	North Gyeongsang	Gunwi County	64.81
Ubo	우보면	友保面	North Gyeongsang	Gunwi County	60.00
Uiheung	의흥면	義興面	North Gyeongsang	Gunwi County	54.17
Sanseong	산성면	山城面	North Gyeongsang	Gunwi County	36.77
Goro	고로면	古老面	North Gyeongsang	Gunwi County	114.59
Danchon	단촌면	丹村面	North Gyeongsang	Uiseong County	74.18
Jeomgok	점곡면	點谷面	North Gyeongsang	Uiseong County	65.02
Oksan	옥산면	玉山面	North Gyeongsang	Uiseong County	104.12
Sagok	사곡면	舍谷面	North Gyeongsang	Uiseong County	73.40
Chunsan	춘산면	春山面	North Gyeongsang	Uiseong County	67.24
Gaeum	가음면	佳音面	North Gyeongsang	Uiseong County	41.53
Geumseong	금성면	金城面	North Gyeongsang	Uiseong County	74.55
Bongyang	봉양면	鳳陽面	North Gyeongsang	Uiseong County	67.46
Bian	비안면	比安面	North Gyeongsang	Uiseong County	65.51
Gucheon	구천면	龜川面	North Gyeongsang	Uiseong County	46.66
Danmil	단밀면	丹密面	North Gyeongsang	Uiseong County	54.12
Danbuk	단북면	丹北面	North Gyeongsang	Uiseong County	23.91
Angye	안계면	安溪面	North Gyeongsang	Uiseong County	43.68
Dain	다인면	多仁面	North Gyeongsang	Uiseong County	89.78
Sinpyeong	신평면	新平面	North Gyeongsang	Uiseong County	55.87
Anpyeong	안평면	安平面	North Gyeongsang	Uiseong County	101.20
Ansa	안사면	安寺面	North Gyeongsang	Uiseong County	61.78
Budong	부동면	府東面	North Gyeongsang	Cheongsong County	132.81
Bunam	부남면	府南面	North Gyeongsang	Cheongsong County	122.31
Hyeondong	현동면	縣東面	North Gyeongsang	Cheongsong County	78.69
Hyeonseo	현서면	縣西面	North Gyeongsang	Cheongsong County	112.55
Andeok	안덕면	安德面	North Gyeongsang	Cheongsong County	107.73
Pacheon	파천면	巴川面	North Gyeongsang	Cheongsong County	99.02
Jinbo	진보면	眞寶面	North Gyeongsang	Cheongsong County	109.32
Ibam	입암면	立岩面	North Gyeongsang	Yeongyang County	79.06
Cheonggi	청기면	靑杞面	North Gyeongsang	Yeongyang County	140.01
Irwol	일월면	日月面	North Gyeongsang	Yeongyang County	125.60
Subi	수비면	首比面	North Gyeongsang	Yeongyang County	217.56
Seokbo	석보면	石保面	North Gyeongsang	Yeongyang County	122.03
Changsu	창수면	蒼水面	North Gyeongsang	Yeongdeok County	152.29
Byeonggok	병곡면	柄谷面	North Gyeongsang	Yeongdeok County	66.06
Yeonghae	영해면	寧海面	North Gyeongsang	Yeongdeok County	63.97
Chuksan	축산면	丑山面	North Gyeongsang	Yeongdeok County	59.31
Jipum	지품면	知品面	North Gyeongsang	Yeongdeok County	150.27
Ganggu	강구면	江口面	North Gyeongsang	Yeongdeok County	36.81
Dalsan	달산면	達山面	North Gyeongsang	Yeongdeok County	73.52
Namjeong	남정면	南亭面	North Gyeongsang	Yeongdeok County	73.28
Gangnam	각남면	角南面	North Gyeongsang	Cheongdo County	46.84
Gakbuk	각북면	角北面	North Gyeongsang	Cheongdo County	50.95
Geumcheon	금천면	錦川面	North Gyeongsang	Cheongdo County	71.93
Maejeon	매전면	梅田面	North Gyeongsang	Cheongdo County	129.95
Unmun	운문면	雲門面	North Gyeongsang	Cheongdo County	146.87
Iseo	이서면	伊西面	North Gyeongsang	Cheongdo County	55.34
Punggak	풍각면	豊角面	North Gyeongsang	Cheongdo County	61.46
Deokgok	덕곡면	德谷面	North Gyeongsang	Goryeong County	38.57
Unsu	운수면	雲水面	North Gyeongsang	Goryeong County	45.84
Seongsan	성산면	星山面	North Gyeongsang	Goryeong County	48.45
Dasan	다산면	茶山面	North Gyeongsang	Goryeong County	45.87
Gaejin	개진면	開津面	North Gyeongsang	Goryeong County	39.50
Ugok	우곡면	牛谷面	North Gyeongsang	Goryeong County	47.04
Ssangnim	쌍림면	雙林面	North Gyeongsang	Goryeong County	71.45
Seonnam	선남면	船南面	North Gyeongsang	Seongju County	67.08
Yongam	용암면	龍岩面	North Gyeongsang	Seongju County	85.12
Suryun	수륜면	修倫面	North Gyeongsang	Seongju County	89.75
Gacheon	가천면	伽泉面	North Gyeongsang	Seongju County	64.24
Geumsu	금수면	金水面	North Gyeongsang	Seongju County	74.74
Daega	대가면	大家面	North Gyeongsang	Seongju County	28.11
Byeokjin	벽진면	碧珍面	North Gyeongsang	Seongju County	62.78
Chojeon	초전면	草田面	North Gyeongsang	Seongju County	66.72
Wolhang	월항면	月恒面	North Gyeongsang	Seongju County	41.28
Jicheon	지천면	枝川面	North Gyeongsang	Chilgok County	88.86
Dongmyeong	동명면	東明面	North Gyeongsang	Chilgok County	64.03
Gasan	가산면	架山面	North Gyeongsang	Chilgok County	86.81
Yangmok	약목면	若木面	North Gyeongsang	Chilgok County	30.28
Gisan	기산면	基山面	North Gyeongsang	Chilgok County	40.43
Yongmun	용문면	龍門面	North Gyeongsang	Yecheon County	71.18
Sangni	상리면	上里面	North Gyeongsang	Yecheon County	67.32
Hari	하리면	下里面	North Gyeongsang	Yecheon County	34.46
Gamcheon	감천면	甘泉面	North Gyeongsang	Yecheon County	65.02
Bomun	보문면	普門面	North Gyeongsang	Yecheon County	64.78
Homyeong	호명면	虎鳴面	North Gyeongsang	Yecheon County	62.30
Yucheon	유천면	柳川面	North Gyeongsang	Yecheon County	38.72
Yonggung	용궁면	龍宮面	North Gyeongsang	Yecheon County	31.79
Gaepo	개포면	開浦面	North Gyeongsang	Yecheon County	36.22
Jibo	지보면	知保面	North Gyeongsang	Yecheon County	78.44
Pungyang	풍양면	豊壤面	North Gyeongsang	Yecheon County	63.23
Murya	물야면	物野面	North Gyeongsang	Bonghwa County	109.27
Bongseong	봉성면	鳳城面	North Gyeongsang	Bonghwa County	66.68
Beopjeon	법전면	法田面	North Gyeongsang	Bonghwa County	70.22
Chunyang	춘양면	春陽面	North Gyeongsang	Bonghwa County	167.29
Socheon	소천면	小川面	North Gyeongsang	Bonghwa County	264.17
Seokpo	석포면	石浦面	North Gyeongsang	Bonghwa County	150.10
Jaesan	재산면	才山面	North Gyeongsang	Bonghwa County	126.01
Myeongho	명호면	明湖面	North Gyeongsang	Bonghwa County	114.38
Sangun	상운면	祥雲面	North Gyeongsang	Bonghwa County	58.52
Buk	북면	北面	North Gyeongsang	Uljin County	142.06
Geumgangsong	금강송면	金剛松面	North Gyeongsang	Uljin County	298.29
Geunnam	근남면	近南面	North Gyeongsang	Uljin County	57.83
Maehwa	매화면	梅花面	North Gyeongsang	Uljin County	101.54
Giseong	기성면	箕城面	North Gyeongsang	Uljin County	98.56
Onjeong	온정면	溫井面	North Gyeongsang	Uljin County	131.82
Jukbyeon	죽변면	竹邊面	North Gyeongsang	Uljin County	18.34
Hupo	후포면	厚浦面	North Gyeongsang	Uljin County	22.16
Seo	서면	西面	North Gyeongsang	Ulleung County	27.20
Buk	북면	北面	North Gyeongsang	Ulleung County	24.30
Buk	북면	北面	South Gyeongsang	Changwon (Uichang)	73.70
Daesan	대산면	大山面	South Gyeongsang	Changwon (Uichang)	33.80
Gusan	구산면	龜山面	South Gyeongsang	Changwon (Masanhappo)	43.64
Jindong	진동면	鎭東面	South Gyeongsang	Changwon (Masanhappo)	32.30
Jinbuk	진북면	鎭北面	South Gyeongsang	Changwon (Masanhappo)	46.57
Jinjeon	진전면	鎭田面	South Gyeongsang	Changwon (Masanhappo)	78.58
Juchon	주촌면	酒村面	South Gyeongsang	Gimhae	31.29
Jillye	진례면	進禮面	South Gyeongsang	Gimhae	44.82
Hallim	한림면	翰林面	South Gyeongsang	Gimhae	59.51
Saengnim	생림면	生林面	South Gyeongsang	Gimhae	50.18
Sangdong	상동면	上東面	South Gyeongsang	Gimhae	70.51
Daedong	대동면	大東面	South Gyeongsang	Gimhae	48.63
Naedong	내동면	奈洞面	South Gyeongsang	Jinju	32.12
Jeongchon	정촌면	井村面	South Gyeongsang	Jinju	26.75
Geumgok	금곡면	金谷面	South Gyeongsang	Jinju	39.86
Jinseong	진성면	晉城面	South Gyeongsang	Jinju	36.40
Ilbanseong	일반성면	一班城面	South Gyeongsang	Jinju	19.44
Ibanseong	이반성면	二班城面	South Gyeongsang	Jinju	42.58
Sabong	사봉면	寺奉面	South Gyeongsang	Jinju	31.96
Jisu	지수면	智水面	South Gyeongsang	Jinju	30.97
Daegok	대곡면	大谷面	South Gyeongsang	Jinju	55.89
Geumsan	금산면	琴山面	South Gyeongsang	Jinju	32.78
Jiphyeon	집현면	集賢面	South Gyeongsang	Jinju	46.23
Micheon	미천면	美川面	South Gyeongsang	Jinju	54.63
Myeongseok	명석면	鳴石面	South Gyeongsang	Jinju	69.30
Daepyeong	대평면	大坪面	South Gyeongsang	Jinju	41.05
Sugok	수곡면	水谷面	South Gyeongsang	Jinju	42.50
Dong	동면	東面	South Gyeongsang	Yangsan	56.35
Wondong	원동면	院東面	South Gyeongsang	Yangsan	148.02
Sangbuk	상북면	上北面	South Gyeongsang	Yangsan	68.47
Habuk	하북면	下北面	South Gyeongsang	Yangsan	68.65
Geoje	거제면	巨濟面	South Gyeongsang	Geoje	37.30
Nambu	남부면	南部面	South Gyeongsang	Geoje	31.87
Dongbu	동부면	東部面	South Gyeongsang	Geoje	52.50
Dundeok	둔덕면	屯德面	South Gyeongsang	Geoje	33.78
Sadeung	사등면	沙等面	South Gyeongsang	Geoje	34.69
Yeoncho	연초면	延草面	South Gyeongsang	Geoje	40.14
Irun	일운면	一運面	South Gyeongsang	Geoje	30.50
Jangmok	장목면	長木面	South Gyeongsang	Geoje	36.89
Hacheong	하청면	河淸面	South Gyeongsang	Geoje	29.10
Yongnam	용남면	龍南面	South Gyeongsang	Tongyeong	16.97
Dosan	도산면	道山面	South Gyeongsang	Tongyeong	38.58
Gwangdo	광도면	光道面	South Gyeongsang	Tongyeong	40.61
Yokji	욕지면	欲知面	South Gyeongsang	Tongyeong	23.94
Hansan	한산면	閑山面	South Gyeongsang	Tongyeong	30.28
Saryang	사량면	蛇梁面	South Gyeongsang	Tongyeong	26.98
Jeongdong	정동면	正東面	South Gyeongsang	Sacheon	36.65
Sanam	사남면	泗南面	South Gyeongsang	Sacheon	42.47
Yonghyeon	용현면	龍見面	South Gyeongsang	Sacheon	27.85
Chukdong	축동면	杻東面	South Gyeongsang	Sacheon	23.29
Gonyang	곤양면	昆陽面	South Gyeongsang	Sacheon	61.12
Gonmyeong	곤명면	昆明面	South Gyeongsang	Sacheon	69.81
Seopo	서포면	西浦面	South Gyeongsang	Sacheon	47.99
Bubuk	부북면	府北面	South Gyeongsang	Miryang	55.31
Sangdong	상동면	上東面	South Gyeongsang	Miryang	52.01
Sanoe	산외면	山外面	South Gyeongsang	Miryang	35.41
Sannae	산내면	山內面	South Gyeongsang	Miryang	107.49
Danjang	단장면	丹場面	South Gyeongsang	Miryang	142.12
Sangnam	상남면	上南面	South Gyeongsang	Miryang	56.11
Chodong	초동면	初同面	South Gyeongsang	Miryang	48.45
Muan	무안면	武安面	South Gyeongsang	Miryang	100.33
Cheongdo	청도면	淸道面	South Gyeongsang	Miryang	57.44
Haman	함안면	咸安面	South Gyeongsang	Haman County	28.92
Gunbuk	군북면	郡北面	South Gyeongsang	Haman County	80.46
Beopsu	법수면	法守面	South Gyeongsang	Haman County	34.61
Daesan	대산면	代山面	South Gyeongsang	Haman County	47.55
Chilseo	칠서면	漆西面	South Gyeongsang	Haman County	35.95
Chilbuk	칠북면	漆北面	South Gyeongsang	Haman County	32.31
Sanin	산인면	山仁面	South Gyeongsang	Haman County	36.86
Yeohang	여항면	艅航面	South Gyeongsang	Haman County	28.34
Jusang	주상면	主尙面	South Gyeongsang	Geochang County	50.01
Ungyang	웅양면	熊陽面	South Gyeongsang	Geochang County	58.47
Goje	고제면	高梯面	South Gyeongsang	Geochang County	58.47
Buksang	북상면	北上面	South Gyeongsang	Geochang County	125.30
Wicheon	위천면	渭川面	South Gyeongsang	Geochang County	54.75
Mari	마리면	馬利面	South Gyeongsang	Geochang County	46.62
Namsang	남상면	南上面	South Gyeongsang	Geochang County	68.51
Namha	남하면	南下面	South Gyeongsang	Geochang County	49.83
Sinwon	신원면	神院面	South Gyeongsang	Geochang County	73.71
Gajo	가조면	加祚面	South Gyeongsang	Geochang County	66.15
Gabuk	가북면	加北面	South Gyeongsang	Geochang County	96.25
Goam	고암면	高岩面	South Gyeongsang	Changnyeong County	44.48
Seongsan	성산면	城山面	South Gyeongsang	Changnyeong County	47.03
Daehap	대합면	大合面	South Gyeongsang	Changnyeong County	46.56
Ibang	이방면	梨房面	South Gyeongsang	Changnyeong County	46.60
Yueo	유어면	遊漁面	South Gyeongsang	Changnyeong County	33.29
Daeji	대지면	大池面	South Gyeongsang	Changnyeong County	17.87
Gyeseong	계성면	桂城面	South Gyeongsang	Changnyeong County	27.86
Yeongsan	영산면	靈山面	South Gyeongsang	Changnyeong County	29.36
Jangma	장마면	丈麻面	South Gyeongsang	Changnyeong County	29.99
Docheon	도천면	都泉面	South Gyeongsang	Changnyeong County	25.45
Gilgok	길곡면	吉谷面	South Gyeongsang	Changnyeong County	27.57
Bugok	부곡면	釜谷面	South Gyeongsang	Changnyeong County	27.57
Samsan	삼산면	三山面	South Gyeongsang	Goseong County	35.10
Hail	하일면	下一面	South Gyeongsang	Goseong County	30.99
Hai	하이면	下二面	South Gyeongsang	Goseong County	37.83
Sangni	상리면	上里面	South Gyeongsang	Goseong County	45.99
Daega	대가면	大可面	South Gyeongsang	Goseong County	52.26
Yeonghyeon	영현면	永縣面	South Gyeongsang	Goseong County	32.17
Yeongo	영오면	永吾面	South Gyeongsang	Goseong County	22.77
Gaecheon	개천면	介川面	South Gyeongsang	Goseong County	40.45
Guman	구만면	九萬面	South Gyeongsang	Goseong County	22.23
Hoehwa	회화면	會華面	South Gyeongsang	Goseong County	29.65
Maam	마암면	馬岩面	South Gyeongsang	Goseong County	33.70
Donghae	동해면	東海面	South Gyeongsang	Goseong County	53.45
Georyu	거류면	巨流面	South Gyeongsang	Goseong County	36.57
Hwagae	화개면	花開面	South Gyeongsang	Hadong County	134.36
Agyang	악양면	岳陽面	South Gyeongsang	Hadong County	52.64
Jeongnyang	적량면	赤良面	South Gyeongsang	Hadong County	41.71
Hoengcheon	횡천면	橫川面	South Gyeongsang	Hadong County	34.50
Gojeon	고전면	古田面	South Gyeongsang	Hadong County	36.18
Geumnam	금남면	金南面	South Gyeongsang	Hadong County	43.10
Jingyo	진교면	辰橋面	South Gyeongsang	Hadong County	49.93
Yangbo	양보면	良甫面	South Gyeongsang	Hadong County	34.42
Bukcheon	북천면	北川面	South Gyeongsang	Hadong County	32.94
Cheongam	청암면	靑岩面	South Gyeongsang	Hadong County	75.63
Okjong	옥종면	玉宗面	South Gyeongsang	Hadong County	87.80
Geumseong	금성면	金星面	South Gyeongsang	Hadong County	22.27
Bongsan	봉산면	鳳山面	South Gyeongsang	Hapcheon County	80.60
Myosan	묘산면	妙山面	South Gyeongsang	Hapcheon County	50.02
Gaya	가야면	伽倻面	South Gyeongsang	Hapcheon County	104.99
Yaro	야로면	冶爐面	South Gyeongsang	Hapcheon County	47.91
Yulgok	율곡면	栗谷面	South Gyeongsang	Hapcheon County	72.30
Chogye	초계면	草溪面	South Gyeongsang	Hapcheon County	23.03
Ssangchaek	쌍책면	雙冊面	South Gyeongsang	Hapcheon County	39.62
Deokgok	덕곡면	德谷面	South Gyeongsang	Hapcheon County	26.61
Cheongdeok	청덕면	靑德面	South Gyeongsang	Hapcheon County	57.50
Jeokjung	적중면	赤中面	South Gyeongsang	Hapcheon County	23.91
Daeyang	대양면	大陽面	South Gyeongsang	Hapcheon County	57.12
Ssangbaek	쌍백면	雙栢面	South Gyeongsang	Hapcheon County	63.30
Samga	삼가면	三嘉面	South Gyeongsang	Hapcheon County	60.57
Gahoe	가회면	佳會面	South Gyeongsang	Hapcheon County	70.93
Daebyeong	대병면	大幷面	South Gyeongsang	Hapcheon County	63.20
Yongju	용주면	龍洲面	South Gyeongsang	Hapcheon County	89.29
Gohyeon	고현면	古縣面	South Gyeongsang	Namhae County	28.90
Seolcheon	설천면	雪川面	South Gyeongsang	Namhae County	24.90
Nam	남면	南面	South Gyeongsang	Namhae County	43.50
Seo	서면	西面	South Gyeongsang	Namhae County	41.00
Idong	이동면	二東面	South Gyeongsang	Namhae County	47.00
Samdong	삼동면	三東面	South Gyeongsang	Namhae County	51.20
Sangju	상주면	尙州面	South Gyeongsang	Namhae County	23.80
Mijo	미조면	彌助面	South Gyeongsang	Namhae County	15.70
Changseon	창선면	昌善面	South Gyeongsang	Namhae County	54.40
Macheon	마천면	馬川面	South Gyeongsang	Hamyang County	107.52
Hyucheon	휴천면	休川面	South Gyeongsang	Hamyang County	61.91
Yurim	유림면	柳林面	South Gyeongsang	Hamyang County	29.54
Sudong	수동면	水東面	South Gyeongsang	Hamyang County	49.09
Jigok	지곡면	池谷面	South Gyeongsang	Hamyang County	41.97
Anui	안의면	安義面	South Gyeongsang	Hamyang County	99.15
Seoha	서하면	西下面	South Gyeongsang	Hamyang County	71.96
Seosang	서상면	西上面	South Gyeongsang	Hamyang County	90.13
Baekjeon	백전면	栢田面	South Gyeongsang	Hamyang County	55.91
Byeonggok	병곡면	甁谷面	South Gyeongsang	Hamyang County	48.35
Chahwang	차황면	車黃面	South Gyeongsang	Sancheong County	48.74
Obu	오부면	梧釜面	South Gyeongsang	Sancheong County	35.06
Saengcho	생초면	生草面	South Gyeongsang	Sancheong County	52.99
Geumseo	금서면	今西面	South Gyeongsang	Sancheong County	76.33
Samjang	삼장면	三壯面	South Gyeongsang	Sancheong County	103.26
Sicheon	시천면	矢川面	South Gyeongsang	Sancheong County	127.71
Danseong	단성면	丹城面	South Gyeongsang	Sancheong County	108.68
Sinan	신안면	新安面	South Gyeongsang	Sancheong County	72.18
Saengbiryang	생비량면	生比良面	South Gyeongsang	Sancheong County	43.97
Sindeung	신등면	新等面	South Gyeongsang	Sancheong County	56.88
Garye	가례면	嘉禮面	South Gyeongsang	Uiryeong County	35.55
Chilgok	칠곡면	七谷面	South Gyeongsang	Uiryeong County	22.37
Daeui	대의면	大義面	South Gyeongsang	Uiryeong County	35.88
Hwajeong	화정면	華正面	South Gyeongsang	Uiryeong County	38.29
Yongdeok	용덕면	龍德面	South Gyeongsang	Uiryeong County	33.83
Jeonggok	정곡면	正谷面	South Gyeongsang	Uiryeong County	40.17
Jijeong	지정면	芝正面	South Gyeongsang	Uiryeong County	46.91
Nakseo	낙서면	洛西面	South Gyeongsang	Uiryeong County	23.44
Burim	부림면	富林面	South Gyeongsang	Uiryeong County	47.96
Bongsu	봉수면	鳳樹面	South Gyeongsang	Uiryeong County	33.06
Gungnyu	궁류면	宮柳面	South Gyeongsang	Uiryeong County	43.57
Yugok	유곡면	柳谷面	South Gyeongsang	Uiryeong County	47.56
Osan	오산면	五山面	North Jeolla	Iksan	29.50
Hwangdeung	황등면	黃登面	North Jeolla	Iksan	27.80
Hamna	함라면	咸羅面	North Jeolla	Iksan	22.80
Ungpo	웅포면	熊浦面	North Jeolla	Iksan	33.00
Seongdang	성당면	聖堂面	North Jeolla	Iksan	19.40
Yongan	용안면	龍安面	North Jeolla	Iksan	25.60
Nangsan	낭산면	朗山面	North Jeolla	Iksan	34.90
Mangseong	망성면	望城面	North Jeolla	Iksan	31.80
Yeosan	여산면	礪山面	North Jeolla	Iksan	36.30
Geumma	금마면	金馬面	North Jeolla	Iksan	28.40
Wanggung	왕궁면	王宮面	North Jeolla	Iksan	45.70
Chunpo	춘포면	春浦面	North Jeolla	Iksan	29.60
Samgi	삼기면	三箕面	North Jeolla	Iksan	23.30
Yongdong	용동면	龍東面	North Jeolla	Iksan	16.70
Oksan	옥산면	玉山面	North Jeolla	Gunsan	16.73
Hoehyeon	회현면	澮縣面	North Jeolla	Gunsan	39.90
Impi	임피면	臨陂面	North Jeolla	Gunsan	21.98
Seosu	서수면	瑞穗面	North Jeolla	Gunsan	24.23
Daeya	대야면	大野面	North Jeolla	Gunsan	37.86
Gaejeong	개정면	開井面	North Jeolla	Gunsan	16.84
Seongsan	성산면	聖山面	North Jeolla	Gunsan	27.40
Napo	나포면	羅浦面	North Jeolla	Gunsan	31.08
Okdo	옥도면	玉島面	North Jeolla	Gunsan	23.513
Okseo	옥서면	玉西面	North Jeolla	Gunsan	20.92
Buk	북면	北面	North Jeolla	Jeongeup	35.64
Ibam	입암면	笠岩面	North Jeolla	Jeongeup	35.80
Soseong	소성면	所聲面	North Jeolla	Jeongeup	29.06
Gobu	고부면	古阜面	North Jeolla	Jeongeup	40.02
Yeongwon	영원면	永元面	North Jeolla	Jeongeup	24.96
Deokcheon	덕천면	德川面	North Jeolla	Jeongeup	20.66
Ipyeong	이평면	梨坪面	North Jeolla	Jeongeup	25.73
Jeongu	정우면	淨雨面	North Jeolla	Jeongeup	30.34
Taein	태인면	泰仁面	North Jeolla	Jeongeup	34.20
Gamgok	감곡면	甘谷面	North Jeolla	Jeongeup	41.57
Ongdong	옹동면	瓮東面	North Jeolla	Jeongeup	39.88
Chilbo	칠보면	七寶面	North Jeolla	Jeongeup	49.60
Sannae	산내면	山內面	North Jeolla	Jeongeup	64.98
Sanoe	산외면	山外面	North Jeolla	Jeongeup	62.74
Juksan	죽산면	竹山面	North Jeolla	Gimje	36.81
Baeksan	백산면	白山面	North Jeolla	Gimje	29.35
Yongji	용지면	龍池面	North Jeolla	Gimje	34.90
Baekgu	백구면	白鷗面	North Jeolla	Gimje	21.98
Buryang	부량면	扶梁面	North Jeolla	Gimje	20.10
Gongdeok	공덕면	孔德面	North Jeolla	Gimje	29.20
Cheongha	청하면	靑蝦面	North Jeolla	Gimje	19.79
Seongdeok	성덕면	聖德面	North Jeolla	Gimje	22.22
Jinbong	진봉면	進鳳面	North Jeolla	Gimje	47.09
Geumgu	금구면	金溝面	North Jeolla	Gimje	42.48
Bongnam	봉남면	鳳南面	North Jeolla	Gimje	23.73
Hwangsan	황산면	凰山面	North Jeolla	Gimje	18.14
Geumsan	금산면	金山面	North Jeolla	Gimje	66.78
Gwanghwal	광활면	廣活面	North Jeolla	Gimje	32.14
Jucheon	주천면	朱川面	North Jeolla	Namwon	54.60
Suji	수지면	水旨面	North Jeolla	Namwon	31.50
Songdong	송동면	松洞面	North Jeolla	Namwon	33.20
Jusaeng	주생면	周生面	North Jeolla	Namwon	26.30
Geumji	금지면	金池面	North Jeolla	Namwon	33.50
Daegang	대강면	帶江面	North Jeolla	Namwon	43.90
Daesan	대산면	大山面	North Jeolla	Namwon	36.10
Samae	사매면	巳梅面	North Jeolla	Namwon	32.20
Deokgwa	덕과면	德果面	North Jeolla	Namwon	23.70
Bojeol	보절면	寶節面	North Jeolla	Namwon	42.00
Sandong	산동면	山東面	North Jeolla	Namwon	53.80
Ibaek	이백면	二百面	North Jeolla	Namwon	43.60
Inwol	인월면	引月面	North Jeolla	Namwon	37.50
Ayeong	아영면	阿英面	North Jeolla	Namwon	35.50
Sannae	산내면	山內面	North Jeolla	Namwon	103.40
Iseo	이서면	伊西面	North Jeolla	Wanju County	33.47
Soyang	소양면	所陽面	North Jeolla	Wanju County	94.16
Gui	구이면	九耳面	North Jeolla	Wanju County	88.69
Sanggwan	상관면	上關面	North Jeolla	Wanju County	68.59
Gosan	고산면	高山面	North Jeolla	Wanju County	69.39
Hwasan	화산면	華山面	North Jeolla	Wanju County	70.90
Bibong	비봉면	飛鳳面	North Jeolla	Wanju County	44.58
Unju	운주면	雲洲面	North Jeolla	Wanju County	92.71
Dongsang	동상면	東上面	North Jeolla	Wanju County	106.52
Gyeongcheon	경천면	庚川面	North Jeolla	Wanju County	38.81
Gosu	고수면	古水面	North Jeolla	Gochang County	45.58
Asan	아산면	雅山面	North Jeolla	Gochang County	74.73
Mujang	무장면	茂長面	North Jeolla	Gochang County	43.78
Gongeum	공음면	孔音面	North Jeolla	Gochang County	50.06
Sangha	상하면	上下面	North Jeolla	Gochang County	32.96
Haeri	해리면	海里面	North Jeolla	Gochang County	39.53
Seongsong	성송면	星松面	North Jeolla	Gochang County	36.25
Daesan	대산면	大山面	North Jeolla	Gochang County	43.84
Simwon	심원면	心元面	North Jeolla	Gochang County	40.07
Heungdeok	흥덕면	興德面	North Jeolla	Gochang County	33.39
Seongnae	성내면	星內面	North Jeolla	Gochang County	30.84
Sillim	신림면	新林面	North Jeolla	Gochang County	40.90
Buan	부안면	富安面	North Jeolla	Gochang County	53.35
Jusan	주산면	舟山面	North Jeolla	Buan County	24.73
Dongjin	동진면	東津面	North Jeolla	Buan County	39.32
Haengan	행안면	幸安面	North Jeolla	Buan County	20.12
Gyehwa	계화면	界火面	North Jeolla	Buan County	49.09
Boan	보안면	保安面	North Jeolla	Buan County	41.45
Byeonsan	변산면	邊山面	North Jeolla	Buan County	85.16
Jinseo	진서면	鎭西面	North Jeolla	Buan County	39.72
Baeksan	백산면	白山面	North Jeolla	Buan County	36.51
Sangseo	상서면	上西面	North Jeolla	Buan County	51.49
Haseo	하서면	下西面	North Jeolla	Buan County	43.22
Julpo	줄포면	茁浦面	North Jeolla	Buan County	23.16
Wido	위도면	蝟島面	North Jeolla	Buan County	14.28
Cheongung	청웅면	靑雄面	North Jeolla	Imsil County	34.77
Unam	운암면	雲岩面	North Jeolla	Imsil County	76.16
Sinpyeong	신평면	新平面	North Jeolla	Imsil County	33.70
Seongsu	성수면	聖壽面	North Jeolla	Imsil County	60.36
Osu	오수면	獒樹面	North Jeolla	Imsil County	40.49
Sindeok	신덕면	新德面	North Jeolla	Imsil County	65.78
Samgye	삼계면	三溪面	North Jeolla	Imsil County	54.08
Gwanchon	관촌면	館村面	North Jeolla	Imsil County	53.63
Gangjin	강진면	江津面	North Jeolla	Imsil County	50.61
Deokchi	덕치면	德峙面	North Jeolla	Imsil County	42.08
Jisa	지사면	只沙面	North Jeolla	Imsil County	17.79
Ingye	인계면	仁溪面	North Jeolla	Sunchang County	36.01
Donggye	동계면	東界面	North Jeolla	Sunchang County	57.09
Jeokseong	적성면	赤城面	North Jeolla	Sunchang County	32.70
Yudeung	유등면	柳等面	North Jeolla	Sunchang County	18.32
Pungsan	풍산면	豊山面	North Jeolla	Sunchang County	28.09
Geumgwa	금과면	金果面	North Jeolla	Sunchang County	27.29
Paldeok	팔덕면	八德面	North Jeolla	Sunchang County	39.35
Bokheung	복흥면	福興面	North Jeolla	Sunchang County	73.72
Ssangchi	쌍치면	雙置面	North Jeolla	Sunchang County	78.54
Gurim	구림면	龜林面	North Jeolla	Sunchang County	83.51
Yongdam	용담면	龍潭面	North Jeolla	Jinan County	54.67
Ancheon	안천면	顔川面	North Jeolla	Jinan County	37.10
Donghyang	동향면	銅鄕面	North Jeolla	Jinan County	52.81
Sangjeon	상전면	上田面	North Jeolla	Jinan County	53.76
Baegun	백운면	白雲面	North Jeolla	Jinan County	86.08
Seongsu	성수면	聖壽面	North Jeolla	Jinan County	70.72
Maryeong	마령면	馬靈面	North Jeolla	Jinan County	42.08
Bugwi	부귀면	富貴面	North Jeolla	Jinan County	104.56
Jeongcheon	정천면	程川面	North Jeolla	Jinan County	75.51
Jucheon	주천면	朱川面	North Jeolla	Jinan County	95.92
Mupung	무풍면	茂豊面	North Jeolla	Muju County	91.20
Seolcheon	설천면	雪川面	North Jeolla	Muju County	158.22
Jeoksang	적상면	赤裳面	North Jeolla	Muju County	135.82
Anseong	안성면	安城面	North Jeolla	Muju County	97.27
Bunam	부남면	富南面	North Jeolla	Muju County	69.96
Sanseo	산서면	山西面	North Jeolla	Jangsu County	47.74
Beonam	번암면	蟠岩面	North Jeolla	Jangsu County	126.06
Janggye	장계면	長溪面	North Jeolla	Jangsu County	67.74
Cheoncheon	천천면	天川面	North Jeolla	Jangsu County	83.91
Gyenam	계남면	溪南面	North Jeolla	Jangsu County	50.28
Gyebuk	계북면	溪北面	North Jeolla	Jangsu County	55.88
Sora	소라면	召羅面	South Jeolla	Yeosu	60.50
Yulchon	율촌면	栗村面	South Jeolla	Yeosu	46.50
Hwayang	화양면	華陽面	South Jeolla	Yeosu	70.10
Nam	남면	南面	South Jeolla	Yeosu	42.40
Hwajeong	화정면	華井面	South Jeolla	Yeosu	26.30
Samsan	삼산면	三山面	South Jeolla	Yeosu	27.60
Juam	주암면	住巖面	South Jeolla	Suncheon	93.83
Songgwang	송광면	松光面	South Jeolla	Suncheon	109.85
Oeseo	외서면	外西面	South Jeolla	Suncheon	35.43
Nagan	낙안면	樂安面	South Jeolla	Suncheon	63.10
Byeollyang	별량면	別良面	South Jeolla	Suncheon	69.67
Sangsa	상사면	上沙面	South Jeolla	Suncheon	60.30
Haeryong	해룡면	海龍面	South Jeolla	Suncheon	46.60
Seo	서면	西面	South Jeolla	Suncheon	103.53
Hwangjeon	황전면	黃田面	South Jeolla	Suncheon	98.80
Woldeung	월등면	月燈面	South Jeolla	Suncheon	44.27
Seji	세지면	細枝面	South Jeolla	Naju	30.03
Wanggok	왕곡면	旺谷面	South Jeolla	Naju	30.13
Bannam	반남면	潘南面	South Jeolla	Naju	20.35
Gongsan	공산면	公山面	South Jeolla	Naju	32.31
Donggang	동강면	洞江面	South Jeolla	Naju	46.89
Dasi	다시면	多侍面	South Jeolla	Naju	56.74
Munpyeong	문평면	文平面	South Jeolla	Naju	46.99
Noan	노안면	老安面	South Jeolla	Naju	42.50
Geumcheon	금천면	金川面	South Jeolla	Naju	26.88
Sanpo	산포면	山浦面	South Jeolla	Naju	20.47
Dado	다도면	茶道面	South Jeolla	Naju	73.16
Bonghwang	봉황면	鳳凰面	South Jeolla	Naju	59.94
Bonggang	봉강면	鳳岡面	South Jeolla	Gwangyang	55.59
Ongnyong	옥룡면	玉龍面	South Jeolla	Gwangyang	66.28
Okgok	옥곡면	玉谷面	South Jeolla	Gwangyang	40.29
Jinsang	진상면	津上面	South Jeolla	Gwangyang	65.49
Jinwol	진월면	津月面	South Jeolla	Gwangyang	37.16
Daap	다압면	多鴨面	South Jeolla	Gwangyang	63.62
Bongsan	봉산면	鳳山面	South Jeolla	Damyang County	19.49
Goseo	고서면	古西面	South Jeolla	Damyang County	26.58
Nam	남면	南面	South Jeolla	Damyang County	43.55
Changpyeong	창평면	昌平面	South Jeolla	Damyang County	33.80
Daedeok	대덕면	大德面	South Jeolla	Damyang County	53.69
Mujeong	무정면	武貞面	South Jeolla	Damyang County	39.31
Geumseong	금성면	金城面	South Jeolla	Damyang County	37.31
Yong	용면	龍面	South Jeolla	Damyang County	62.46
Wolsan	월산면	月山面	South Jeolla	Damyang County	49.63
Subuk	수북면	水北面	South Jeolla	Damyang County	29.06
Daejeon	대전면	大田面	South Jeolla	Damyang County	30.60
Ogok	오곡면	梧谷面	South Jeolla	Gokseong County	62.86
Samgi	삼기면	三岐面	South Jeolla	Gokseong County	38.18
Seokgok	석곡면	石谷面	South Jeolla	Gokseong County	53.19
Moksadong	목사동면	木寺洞面	South Jeolla	Gokseong County	46.75
Jukgok	죽곡면	竹谷面	South Jeolla	Gokseong County	103.39
Godal	고달면	古達面	South Jeolla	Gokseong County	41.93
Okgwa	옥과면	玉果面	South Jeolla	Gokseong County	29.95
Ip	입면	立面	South Jeolla	Gokseong County	34.06
Gyeom	겸면	兼面	South Jeolla	Gokseong County	38.25
Osan	오산면	梧山面	South Jeolla	Gokseong County	46.56
Muncheok	문척면	文尺面	South Jeolla	Gurye County	34.06
Ganjeon	간전면	艮田面	South Jeolla	Gurye County	74.68
Toji	토지면	土旨面	South Jeolla	Gurye County	96.69
Masan	마산면	馬山面	South Jeolla	Gurye County	32.27
Gwangui	광의면	光義面	South Jeolla	Gurye County	33.69
Yongbang	용방면	龍方面	South Jeolla	Gurye County	24.68
Sandong	산동면	山東面	South Jeolla	Gurye County	101.33
Gwayeok	과역면	過驛面	South Jeolla	Goheung County	42.32
Geumsan	금산면	錦山面	South Jeolla	Goheung County	65.67
Namyang	남양면	南陽面	South Jeolla	Goheung County	39.52
Daeseo	대서면	大西面	South Jeolla	Goheung County	34.39
Dodeok	도덕면	道德面	South Jeolla	Goheung County	37.78
Dohwa	도화면	道化面	South Jeolla	Goheung County	66.12
Donggang	동강면	東江面	South Jeolla	Goheung County	41.44
Dongil	동일면	東日面	South Jeolla	Goheung County	21.13
Duwon	두원면	豆原面	South Jeolla	Goheung County	58.00
Bongnae	봉래면	蓬萊面	South Jeolla	Goheung County	28.32
Yeongnam	영남면	影南面	South Jeolla	Goheung County	43.62
Jeomam	점암면	占岩面	South Jeolla	Goheung County	69.09
Podu	포두면	浦頭面	South Jeolla	Goheung County	112.31
Pungyang	풍양면	豊陽面	South Jeolla	Goheung County	48.06
Joseong	조성면	鳥城面	South Jeolla	Boseong County	44.62
Deungnyang	득량면	得粮面	South Jeolla	Boseong County	73.93
Nodong	노동면	蘆洞面	South Jeolla	Boseong County	47.33
Miryeok	미력면	彌力面	South Jeolla	Boseong County	30.77
Gyeombaek	겸백면	兼白面	South Jeolla	Boseong County	46.95
Hoecheon	회천면	會泉面	South Jeolla	Boseong County	53.65
Ungchi	웅치면	熊峙面	South Jeolla	Boseong County	39.44
Yureo	율어면	栗於面	South Jeolla	Boseong County	49.07
Bongnae	복내면	福內面	South Jeolla	Boseong County	66.84
Mundeok	문덕면	文德面	South Jeolla	Boseong County	59.33
Hancheon	한천면	寒泉面	South Jeolla	Hwasun County	65.27
Chunyang	춘양면	春陽面	South Jeolla	Hwasun County	49.92
Cheongpung	청풍면	淸豊面	South Jeolla	Hwasun County	50.19
Iyang	이양면	梨陽面	South Jeolla	Hwasun County	92.00
Neungju	능주면	綾州面	South Jeolla	Hwasun County	15.87
Dogok	도곡면	道谷面	South Jeolla	Hwasun County	38.17
Doam	도암면	道岩面	South Jeolla	Hwasun County	50.90
Iseo	이서면	二西面	South Jeolla	Hwasun County	52.71
Buk	북면	北面	South Jeolla	Hwasun County	85.40
Dongbok	동복면	同福面	South Jeolla	Hwasun County	62.96
Nam	남면	南面	South Jeolla	Hwasun County	86.55
Dong	동면	東面	South Jeolla	Hwasun County	67.04
Yongsan	용산면	蓉山面	South Jeolla	Jangheung County	72.34
Anyang	안양면	安良面	South Jeolla	Jangheung County	51.15
Jangdong	장동면	長東面	South Jeolla	Jangheung County	44.85
Jangpyeong	장평면	長平面	South Jeolla	Jangheung County	77.87
Yuchi	유치면	有治面	South Jeolla	Jangheung County	122.17
Busan	부산면	夫山面	South Jeolla	Jangheung County	38.01
Hoejin	회진면	會鎭面	South Jeolla	Jangheung County	25.99
Gundong	군동면	郡東面	South Jeolla	Gangjin County	60.69
Chillyang	칠량면	七良面	South Jeolla	Gangjin County	59.69
Daegu	대구면	大口面	South Jeolla	Gangjin County	33.53
Maryang	마량면	馬良面	South Jeolla	Gangjin County	20.11
Doam	도암면	道岩面	South Jeolla	Gangjin County	69.42
Sinjeon	신전면	薪田面	South Jeolla	Gangjin County	40.42
Seongjeon	성전면	城田面	South Jeolla	Gangjin County	64.69
Jakcheon	작천면	鵲川面	South Jeolla	Gangjin County	44.15
Byeongyeong	병영면	兵營面	South Jeolla	Gangjin County	26.99
Omcheon	옴천면	唵川面	South Jeolla	Gangjin County	29.68
Samsan	삼산면	三山面	South Jeolla	Haenam County	50.87
Hwasan	화산면	花山面	South Jeolla	Haenam County	57.10
Hyeonsan	현산면	縣山面	South Jeolla	Haenam County	90.35
Songji	송지면	松旨面	South Jeolla	Haenam County	80.45
Bukpyeong	북평면	北平面	South Jeolla	Haenam County	48.05
Bugil	북일면	北日面	South Jeolla	Haenam County	41.37
Okcheon	옥천면	玉泉面	South Jeolla	Haenam County	61.07
Gyegok	계곡면	溪谷面	South Jeolla	Haenam County	78.08
Masan	마산면	馬山面	South Jeolla	Haenam County	80.20
Hwangsan	황산면	黃山面	South Jeolla	Haenam County	103.19
Sani	산이면	山二面	South Jeolla	Haenam County	85.08
Munnae	문내면	門內面	South Jeolla	Haenam County	56.59
Hwawon	화원면	花源面	South Jeolla	Haenam County	90.03
Sijong	시종면	始終面	South Jeolla	Yeongam County	35.80
Dopo	도포면	都浦面	South Jeolla	Yeongam County	72.98
Seoho	서호면	西湖面	South Jeolla	Yeongam County	48.90
Haksan	학산면	鶴山面	South Jeolla	Yeongam County	61.92
Deokjin	덕진면	德津面	South Jeolla	Yeongam County	26.20
Geumjeong	금정면	金井面	South Jeolla	Yeongam County	73.05
Sinbuk	신북면	新北面	South Jeolla	Yeongam County	48.90
Gunseo	군서면	郡西面	South Jeolla	Yeongam County	61.92
Miam	미암면	美岩面	South Jeolla	Yeongam County	41.70
Mongtan	몽탄면	夢灘面	South Jeolla	Muan County	63.09
Cheonggye	청계면	靑溪面	South Jeolla	Muan County	65.49
Hyeongyeong	현경면	玄慶面	South Jeolla	Muan County	55.35
Mangun	망운면	望雲面	South Jeolla	Muan County	19.11
Haeje	해제면	海際面	South Jeolla	Muan County	64.44
Unnam	운남면	雲南面	South Jeolla	Muan County	34.94
Sonbul	손불면	孫佛面	South Jeolla	Hampyeong County	55.27
Singwang	신광면	新光面	South Jeolla	Hampyeong County	41.06
Hakgyo	학교면	鶴橋面	South Jeolla	Hampyeong County	46.42
Eomda	엄다면	嚴多面	South Jeolla	Hampyeong County	23.31
Daedong	대동면	大洞面	South Jeolla	Hampyeong County	56.52
Nasan	나산면	羅山面	South Jeolla	Hampyeong County	55.62
Haebo	해보면	海保面	South Jeolla	Hampyeong County	39.49
Worya	월야면	月也面	South Jeolla	Hampyeong County	34.51
Beopseong	법성면	法聖面	South Jeolla	Yeonggwang County	35.05
Daema	대마면	大馬面	South Jeolla	Yeonggwang County	44.72
Myoryang	묘량면	畝良面	South Jeolla	Yeonggwang County	36.99
Bulgap	불갑면	佛甲面	South Jeolla	Yeonggwang County	25.92
Gunseo	군서면	郡西面	South Jeolla	Yeonggwang County	48.81
Gunnam	군남면	郡南面	South Jeolla	Yeonggwang County	65.03
Yeomsan	염산면	鹽山面	South Jeolla	Yeonggwang County	34.29
Nagwol	낙월면	落月面	South Jeolla	Yeonggwang County	12.13
Jinwon	진원면	珍原面	South Jeolla	Jangseong County	28.30
Nam	남면	南面	South Jeolla	Jangseong County	28.40
Donghwa	동화면	東化面	South Jeolla	Jangseong County	28.80
Samseo	삼서면	森西面	South Jeolla	Jangseong County	47.50
Samgye	삼계면	森溪面	South Jeolla	Jangseong County	66.00
Hwangnyong	황룡면	黃龍面	South Jeolla	Jangseong County	44.70
Seosam	서삼면	西三面	South Jeolla	Jangseong County	34.10
Bugil	북일면	北一面	South Jeolla	Jangseong County	30.60
Bugi	북이면	北二面	South Jeolla	Jangseong County	56.40
Bukha	북하면	北下面	South Jeolla	Jangseong County	84.20
Gunoe	군외면	郡外面	South Jeolla	Wando County	42.78
Sinji	신지면	新智面	South Jeolla	Wando County	31.31
Gogeum	고금면	古今面	South Jeolla	Wando County	46.38
Yaksan	약산면	藥山面	South Jeolla	Wando County	28.80
Cheongsan	청산면	靑山面	South Jeolla	Wando County	41.88
Soan	소안면	所安面	South Jeolla	Wando County	28.37
Geumdang	금당면	金塘面	South Jeolla	Wando County	14.22
Bogil	보길면	甫吉面	South Jeolla	Wando County	32.54
Saengil	생일면	生日面	South Jeolla	Wando County	15.07
Gunnae	군내면	郡內面	South Jeolla	Jindo County	63.95
Gogun	고군면	古郡面	South Jeolla	Jindo County	48.48
Uisin	의신면	義新面	South Jeolla	Jindo County	66.25
Imhoe	임회면	臨淮面	South Jeolla	Jindo County	69.62
Jisan	지산면	智山面	South Jeolla	Jindo County	89.91
Jodo	조도면	鳥島面	South Jeolla	Jindo County	57.11
Jeungdo	증도면	曾島面	South Jeolla	Sinan County	33.62
Imja	임자면	荏子面	South Jeolla	Sinan County	47.21
Jaeun	자은면	慈恩面	South Jeolla	Sinan County	52.70
Bigeum	비금면	飛禽面	South Jeolla	Sinan County	51.61
Docho	도초면	都草面	South Jeolla	Sinan County	55.30
Heuksan	흑산면	黑山面	South Jeolla	Sinan County	48.41
Haui	하의면	荷衣面	South Jeolla	Sinan County	34.63
Sinui	신의면	新衣面	South Jeolla	Sinan County	33.24
Jangsan	장산면	長山面	South Jeolla	Sinan County	29.20
Anjwa	안좌면	安佐面	South Jeolla	Sinan County	59.99
Palgeum	팔금면	八禽面	South Jeolla	Sinan County	18.43
Amtae	암태면	岩泰面	South Jeolla	Sinan County	43.24
Hangyeong	한경면	翰京面	Jeju	Jeju	79.03
Chuja	추자면	楸子面	Jeju	Jeju	7.05
Udo	우도면	牛島面	Jeju	Jeju	6.18
Andeok	안덕면	安德面	Jeju	Seogwipo	105.60
Pyoseon	표선면	表善面	Jeju	Seogwipo	135.16
Ilgwang	일광면	日光面	Busan	Gijang County	35.76
Cheolma	철마면	鐵馬面	Busan	Gijang County	53.94
Gachang	가창면	嘉昌面	Daegu	Dalseong County	111.17
Habin	하빈면	河濱面	Daegu	Dalseong County	36.70
Okpo	옥포면	玉浦面	Daegu	Dalseong County	48.94
Hyeonpung	현풍면	玄風面	Daegu	Dalseong County	24.47
Yuga	유가면	瑜伽面	Daegu	Dalseong County	57.37
Guji	구지면	求智面	Daegu	Dalseong County	39.75
Seonwon	선원면	仙源面	Incheon	Ganghwa County	21.39
Bureun	불은면	佛恩面	Incheon	Ganghwa County	31.44
Gilsang	길상면	吉祥面	Incheon	Ganghwa County	35.06
Hwado	화도면	華道面	Incheon	Ganghwa County	42.33
Yangdo	양도면	良道面	Incheon	Ganghwa County	35.43
Naega	내가면	內可面	Incheon	Ganghwa County	29.77
Hajeom	하점면	河岾面	Incheon	Ganghwa County	36.20
Yangsa	양사면	兩寺面	Incheon	Ganghwa County	26.46
Songhae	송해면	松海面	Incheon	Ganghwa County	22.38
Gyodong	교동면	喬桐面	Incheon	Ganghwa County	47.15
Samsan	삼산면	三山面	Incheon	Ganghwa County	45.62
Seodo	서도면	西島面	Incheon	Ganghwa County	13.21
Bukdo	북도면	北島面	Incheon	Ongjin County	17.65
Baengnyeong	백령면	白翎面	Incheon	Ongjin County	51.09
Daecheong	대청면	大靑面	Incheon	Ongjin County	15.60
Deokjeok	덕적면	德積面	Incheon	Ongjin County	36.59
Yeongheung	영흥면	靈興面	Incheon	Ongjin County	26.04
Jawol	자월면	紫月面	Incheon	Ongjin County	17.72
Yeonpyeong	연평면	延坪面	Incheon	Ongjin County	7.30
Yeongi	연기면	燕岐面	Sejong	none	43.93
Yeondong	연동면	燕東面	Sejong	none	28.32
Bugang	부강면	芙江面	Sejong	none	27.79
Geumnam	금남면	錦南面	Sejong	none	78.14
Janggun	장군면	將軍面	Sejong	none	53.23
Yeonseo	연서면	燕西面	Sejong	none	54.58
Jeonui	전의면	全義面	Sejong	none	62.44
Jeondong	전동면	全東面	Sejong	none	57.74
Sojeong	소정면	小井面	Sejong	none	16.48
Seosaeng	서생면	西生面	Ulsan	Ulju County	36.90
Cheongnyang	청량면	靑良面	Ulsan	Ulju County	60.00
Ungchon	웅촌면	熊村面	Ulsan	Ulju County	52.00
Dudong	두동면	斗東面	Ulsan	Ulju County	63.50
Duseo	두서면	斗西面	Ulsan	Ulju County	78.80
Sangbuk	상북면	上北面	Ulsan	Ulju County	123.40
Samnam	삼남면	三南面	Ulsan	Ulju County	31.00
Samdong	삼동면	三同面	Ulsan	Ulju County	62.40

== See also ==
- Administrative divisions of South Korea
