= Jindong =

Jindong may refer to:

== China ==
- Jindong District, Jinhua, Zhejiang
- Jindong, Maoming, in Xinyi, Guangdong
- Jindong Subdistrict, Jinping District, Shantou, Guangdong
- Jindong Township, Chongqing
- Jindong Township, Gansu, in Liangdang County, Gansu
- Jindong Township, Sichuan, in Guangyuan, Sichuan

== South Korea ==
- Jindong-myeon, Paju, Gyeonggi
- Jindong-myeon, Changwon, South Gyeongsang
- Jindong Formation, geological formation in South Gyeongsang

== Others ==
- Jindong, Western Australia, near Busselton
- Jindong Movie Theater, Jinsha Township, Kinmen County, Taiwan

== See also ==
- Jin Dong, Chinese actor
