= Nam-myeon =

Nam-myeon may refer to the following places in South Korea:

- Nam-myeon, Jeongseon County
- Nam-myeon, Yeosu
- Nam-myeon, now Gunpo, Gyeonggi Province
- Nam-myeon, Yangju, a township in South Korea
- Nam-myeon, Chuncheon, a township in South Korea
- Nam-myeon, Gimcheon, a township in South Korea
- Nam-myeon, Namhae, a township in South Korea

== See also ==
- Nam Myeong-ryeol (born 1959), South Korean actor
