= Samsan =

Samsan may refer to:

- Semsan, a village in Iran
- Samsan-myeon (disambiguation), several townships in South Korea
- Samsan Station (disambiguation), several stations in South Korea

== See also ==
- Samsan-dong
