= Geomundo =

Group of islands in Yeosu, South Korea

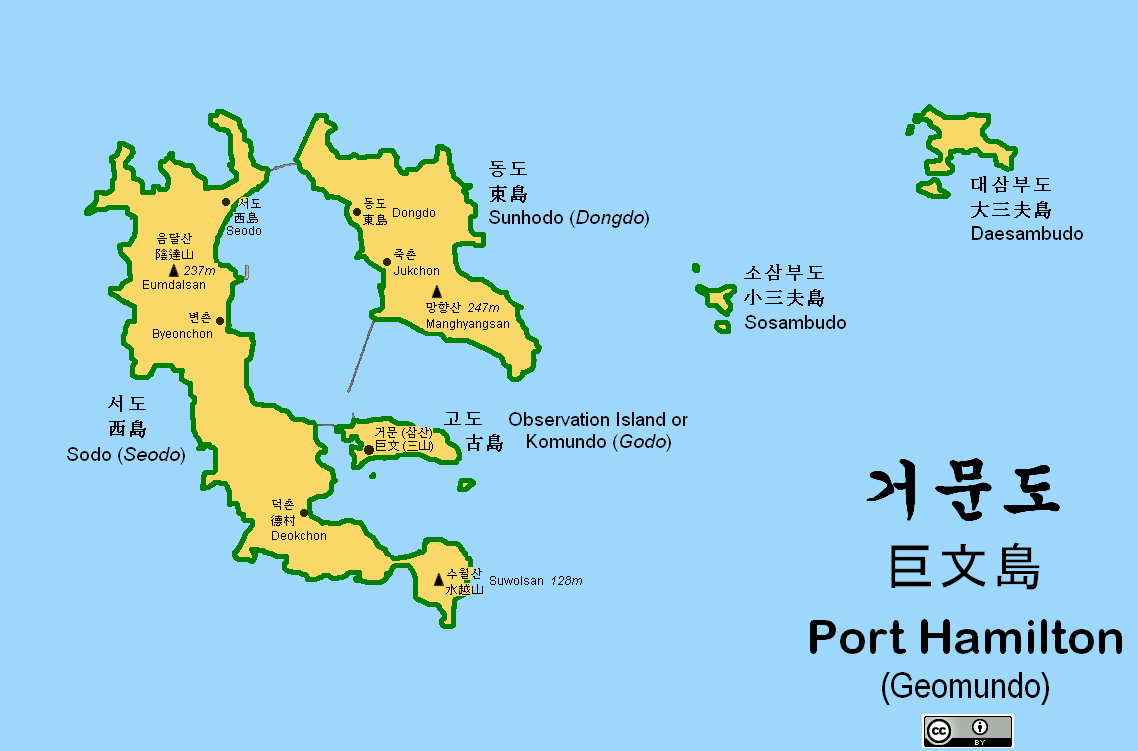

Korean name
- Hangul: 거문도
- Hanja: 巨文島/巨門島
- RR: Geomundo
- MR: Kŏmundo

Geomundo (Korean: 거문도), also known as Port Hamilton, is a small group of islands in the Jeju Strait off the southern coast of the Korean Peninsula, located approximately at 34°1′35″N 127°18′45″E. The islands are 12 km^{2} (4.6 mi^{2}). There are three principal islands, the two larger ones, Sodo to the west (서도; 西島; Seodo) and Sunhodo to the east (동도; 東島; Dongdo) forming a harbor with the smaller island in the center. On this central island, Observatory Island (고도; 古島; Godo), there was a British naval base from 1885 to 1887.

Today, the islands form a part of Samsan-myeon, Yeosu City, South Jeolla Province of South Korea, with the Samsan township offices located on Observation Island. The islands are also part of the Dadohaehaesang National Park.

== History ==
Port Hamilton was surveyed in 1845 by British naval officer Sir Edward Belcher in HMS Samarang and was named after the then secretary of the Admiralty, Captain W. A. B. Hamilton, and became renowned for its strategic importance by others, such as Russian Vice-Admiral Yevfimy Putyatin, who visited the islands several times and obtained permission from natives in 1857 to establish a coal depot, though due to delays in the delivery of the coal, the plan was abandoned.

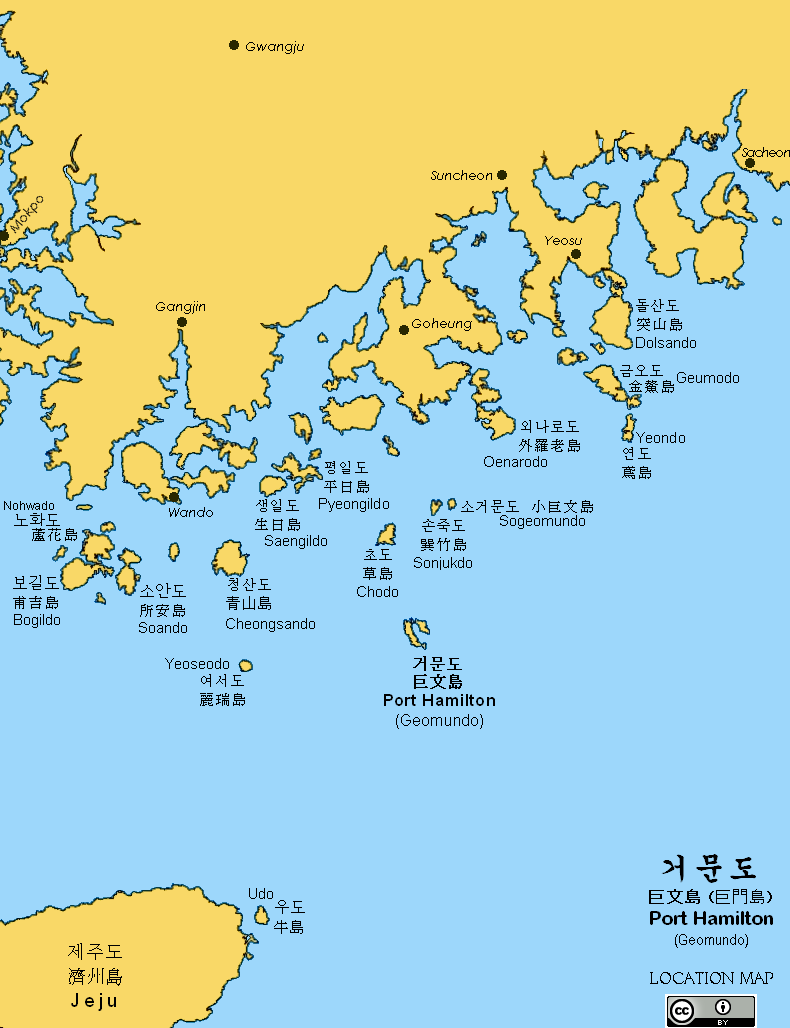
Location of Port Hamilton in the Jeju Strait

Although the United States Secretary of the Navy "in 1884 urged the establishment of a naval station at Port Hamilton, off the southern Korean coast, and although it appears that such facilities were offered by the Korean government, nothing was done."

In April 1885, Port Hamilton was occupied by three ships of the British Royal Navy on orders from the Admiralty in what is known as the Port Hamilton Incident. This was to forestall Russian advances in the face of the Panjdeh Incident in Afghanistan. Port Hamilton served as a counterbalance to the Russian naval base at Vladivostok. By occupying Port Hamilton, the British could prevent Russian advances in east Asia, and block Russian naval activity in the Korea Strait. The British built a few buildings and defensive works and introduced pheasants to the islands. Permission was obtained from China for a cable to be landed at Saddle Island (at the mouth of the Yangtze River). From there, the cable could be connected to the main telegraphic network at Shanghai, thus enabling telegraph communication with Port Hamilton.

After the Russian threat had diminished the British demolished the base and left on 27 February 1887, though they continued to frequent the islands, in one case burying a young sailor there. The visits were less frequent after 1910, when the Japanese Empire annexed Korea.

Until the end of World War II, a Japanese graveyard stood in Port Hamilton. When Japanese claims to the islands were specifically renounced in the Treaty of San Francisco, the Japanese graves were removed, but the British graveyard of ten British soldiers remains up to this day and has become a tourist attraction. Personnel of the British embassy have visited on occasion to pay their respects. The British Ambassador visited most recently in May 2021.

Ten British sailors and marines are buried on the islands including two sailors from HMS Albatross who were killed in March 1886 when their gun exploded, and a young sailor, Alex Wood from HMS Albion, who died in 1903.

== Climate ==
Climate data for Geomundo, Yeosu (1993–2020 normals)
Month	Jan	Feb	Mar	Apr	May	Jun	Jul	Aug	Sep	Oct	Nov	Dec	Year
Mean daily maximum °C (°F)	7.5 (45.5)	9.2 (48.6)	12.6 (54.7)	16.7 (62.1)	20.6 (69.1)	23.8 (74.8)	27.4 (81.3)	29.5 (85.1)	26.0 (78.8)	21.5 (70.7)	15.6 (60.1)	9.8 (49.6)	18.4 (65.1)
Daily mean °C (°F)	5.0 (41.0)	6.1 (43.0)	9.4 (48.9)	13.5 (56.3)	17.3 (63.1)	20.7 (69.3)	24.6 (76.3)	26.7 (80.1)	23.4 (74.1)	18.7 (65.7)	12.9 (55.2)	7.3 (45.1)	15.5 (59.9)
Mean daily minimum °C (°F)	2.7 (36.9)	3.7 (38.7)	6.8 (44.2)	11.0 (51.8)	14.8 (58.6)	18.6 (65.5)	22.6 (72.7)	24.7 (76.5)	21.5 (70.7)	16.8 (62.2)	10.7 (51.3)	5.0 (41.0)	13.2 (55.8)
Average precipitation mm (inches)	29.8 (1.17)	50.9 (2.00)	86.6 (3.41)	107.5 (4.23)	133.9 (5.27)	184.6 (7.27)	216.5 (8.52)	215.9 (8.50)	156.1 (6.15)	76.8 (3.02)	48.7 (1.92)	30.9 (1.22)	1,338.2 (52.69)
Average precipitation days (≥ 0.1 mm)	4.2	4.9	6.4	7.6	8.0	9.1	9.9	8.5	7.9	4.9	5.6	4.3	81.3
Source: Korea Meteorological Administration
