= Saengildo =

Island in South Korea

Coordinates: 34°19′N 126°59′E

- Hangul: 생일도
- Hanja: 生日島
- Lit.: birthday island
- RR: Saengildo
- MR: Saengilto

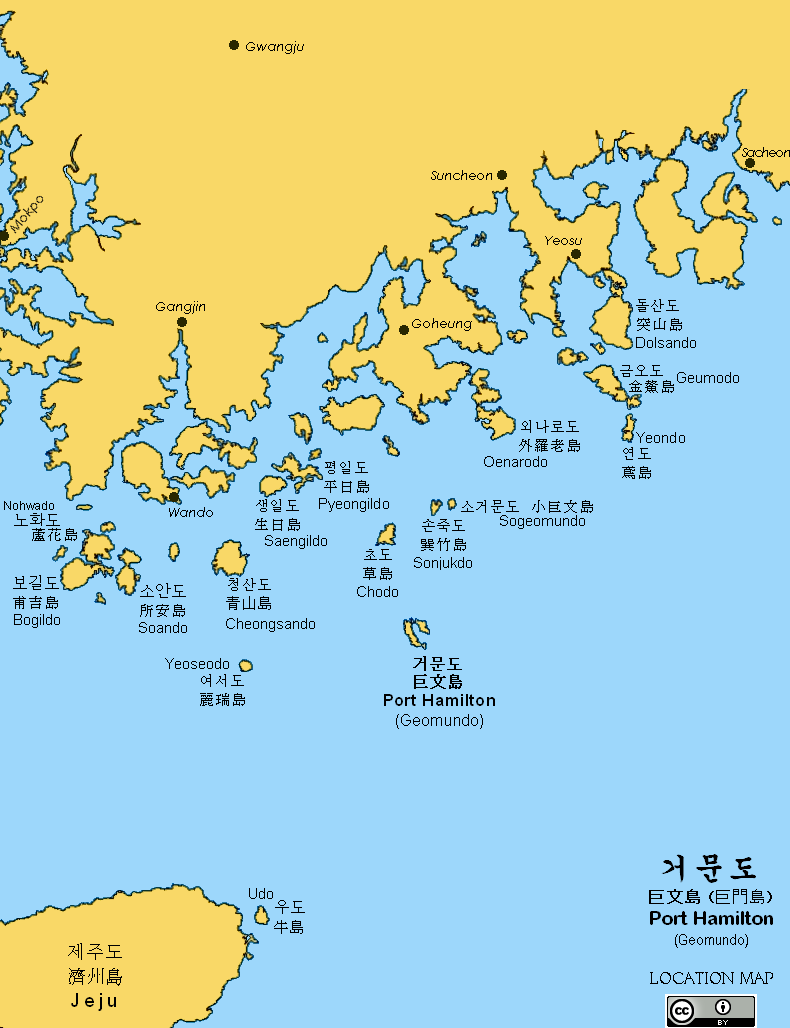
Location of Saengildo in the Jeju Strait (slightly left from map centre)

Saengildo (Korean: 생일도) is a South Korean island of 15 km^{2} in the East China Sea on which the island's economy is based. The highest point is Baegunsan (백운산; 483 m above sea level).

Saengildo, measures 4.6 kilometres (2.9 mi) long and 5.7 kilometres (3.5 mi) wide.

Yongchul pebble beach draws attention of the tourists.

== Administration ==
Yuseo-ri, Geumgok-ri, and Bongseon-ri, Saengil-myeon, Wando County, South Jeolla Province, South Korea
