= Jangdan =

Jangdan (장단) may refer to:

- Korean Traditional Rhythm in folk music
- Jangdan County, a former county in Gyeonggi Province, Korea, split during the division of Korea
- Jangdan-myeon, Paju, Gyeonggi, South Korea
