= Samsan-myeon =

Samsan-myeon may refer to:

In South Korea:

- Samsan-myeon, Ganghwa County, a township in Ganghwa County, Incheon
- Samsan-myeon, Yeosu, a township in Yeosu, South Jeolla Province
- Samsan-myeon, Haenam County, a township in Haenam County, South Jeolla Province
- Samsan-myeon, Goseong County, a township in Goseong County, South Gyeongsang Province

== See also ==
- List of townships in South Korea
