= Hoejin-myeon =

Coordinates: 34.483°N 126.939°E

- Township
- Interactive map of Hoejin-myeon
- Country: South Korea
- Region: Honam
- Administrative divisions: 16 Ri

Area
  - Total: 25.99 km^{2} (10.03 sq mi)

Population (2011.2.28)
  - Total: 3,413
  - Dialect: Jeolla

Korean name
- Hangul: 회진면
- Hanja: 會鎭面
- RR: Hoejin-myeon
- MR: Hoejin-myŏn

Hoejin-myeon (Korean: 회진면) is a township in Jangheung County, South Jeolla Province, South Korea.

== History ==
During the age of Baekje, the area was named Masaryang-hyeon(馬斯良縣). When it came under the rule of Silla, King Gyeongdeok changed its name to Daero(代勞) and placed it under Boseong County. In 940 (Taejo of Goryeo 23), it was renamed as Hoeryung and placed under Jangheungdohobu. Under the rule of Josun, it continued to be called Hoeryung.

- 1914 Administered by Daedeok
- 1980 Gained the status of Eup
- 1986 Separated as Hoejin-myeon

== Administrative divisions ==
- Daeri
- Deoksanri
- Shinsangri
- Jinmokri
- Hoejinri

== Transportation ==
- Noryeok Port
