= Saengil-myeon =

- Township
- Interactive map of Saengil-myeon
- Coordinates: 34°19′N 126°59′E
- Country: South Korea
- Province: South Jeolla
- County: Wando County
- Administrative divisions: 3 beopjeongni, 6 hangjeongni and 38 ban

Area
  - Total: 15.02 km^{2} (5.80 sq mi)

Population (2014.1)
  - Total: 878
  - Density: 58.5/km^{2} (151/sq mi)
- Website: Saengil Town

Korean name
- Hangul: 생일면
- Hanja: 生日面
- RR: Saengil-myeon
- MR: Saengil-myŏn

Saengil (Korean: 생일; lit. 'birthday') is a township, or myeon in Wando County, South Jeolla Province, South Korea. The southwestern portion of the town Geumil-eup was separated and newly designated as the township Saengil-myeon in 1989. Saengil Town Office is located in Yuseo-ri, which is crowded with people.

== Communities ==
Saengil-myeon is divided into 3 villages (ri).

Beopjeongni	Hangul	Hanja	Hangjeongni	Islands
Yuseo-ri	유서리	柳西里	Seoseong-ri (서성리, 西城里)	Saengildo
Yuseo-ri	유서리	柳西里	Yuchon-ri (유촌리, 柳村里)	Saengildo
Geumgok-ri	금곡리	金谷里	Geumgok-ri	Saengildo
Bongseon-ri	봉선리	鳳仙里	Yongchul-ri (용출리, 龍出里)	Saengildo
Bongseon-ri	봉선리	鳳仙里	Guljeon-ri (굴전리, 窟前里)	Saengildo
Bongseon-ri	봉선리	鳳仙里	Deogu-ri (덕우리, 德牛里)	Deogudo and 12 uninhabited islands
