= Mitan-myeon =

- Township
- Location of Mitan-myeon in South Korea
- Coordinates: 37°20′31.25″N 128°29′57.68″E
- Country: South Korea
- Province: Gangwon
- County: Pyeongchang
- Administrative divisions: 13 ri

Area
  - Total: 109.74 km^{2} (42.37 sq mi)

Population (2008)
  - Total: 1,881
- Time zone: UTC+9 (Korea Standard Time)

Korean name
- Hangul: 미탄면
- Hanja: 美灘面
- RR: Mitan-myeon
- MR: Mit'an-myŏn

Mitan-myeon (Korean: 미탄면) is a myeon (township) in Pyeongchang county of Gangwon-do South Korea. The myeon is located in northern central part of the county. The total area of Mitan-myeon is 109.74 square kilometers, and, as of 2008, the population was 1,881 people.

== Natural monument ==
- The Dragon cave
