= Daehwa-myeon =

- Township
- Location of Yongpyeong-myeon in South Korea
- Coordinates: 37°30′2.06″N 128°27′18.63″E
- Country: South Korea
- Province: Gangwon
- County: Pyeongchang
- Administrative divisions: 19 ri

Area
  - Total: 166.65 km^{2} (64.34 sq mi)

Population (2008)
  - Total: 5,942
- Time zone: UTC+9 (Korea Standard Time)

Korean name
- Hangul: 대화면
- Hanja: 大和面
- RR: Daehwa-myeon
- MR: Taehwa-myŏn

Daehwa-myeon (Korean: 대화면) is a myeon (township) in Pyeongchang county of Gangwon Province, South Korea. The myeon is located in northern central part of the county. The total area of Daehwa-myeon is 166.65 square kilometers, and, as of 2008, the population was 5,942 people.

== TV shows ==
- Happy Sunday and 2 Days & 1 Night have been shot in a local farm in August 2009.
