= Port Hamilton incident =

1885–1887 British intervention in Korea

Date	15 April 1885 – 27 February 1887
Location	Port Hamilton
Result	Occupation ended

Belligerents
Joseon	(United Kingdom) British Empire: British Royal Navy

The Geomun Island incident or the Port Hamilton incident was the military occupation of Geomundo (formerly "Port Hamilton"), Korea, by the British Royal Navy from 15 April 1885 to 27 February 1887.

Russia had intended to use the island as a coaling station.

While the British government was alarmed by rumors of a secret agreement between Russia and Korea, these rumors did not reach the British Cabinet until after the decision to occupy Geomundo had been taken. The port was taken to establish a British port in the Far East outside China in the event of a war with Russia, to mitigate the harmful potential of possible Chinese neutrality. In official statements, the British government claimed that the occupation had been undertaken to preempt Russian annexation of the islands. In response, diplomats such as the then French minister to Japan and newspapers such as the Novoe Vremiya speculated that Russia would counterbalance the British occupation by seizing Port Lazarev (Wonsan) or Jeju Island.

Russia threatened to occupy parts of Korea, in response to British actions. After receiving assurances from the Russians that they would not occupy any part of Korea, the British withdrew.

The proposal to occupy the islands had been considered earlier by the British Cabinet, in July 1875, but was rejected by Foreign Secretary Lord Derby as setting a poor precedent.

== See also ==
- United States expedition to Korea (1871)
- French campaign against Korea (1866)
