= Jeju Undersea Tunnel =

Proposed infrastructure project

The Jeju Undersea Tunnel (제주해저터널) is a proposed undersea tunnel project to connect the South Korean provinces of South Jeolla and Jeju across the Jeju Strait, with intermediate stops at the islands of Bogildo and Chujado. The proposed 73 km tunnel is projected to take 11 years to complete at an estimated cost of 14.6 trillion South Korean won (11.2 billion US Dollars).

== History ==
The underwater tunnel would allow the KTX bullet train to connect the port city of Mokpo and Jeju Island. On June 19, 2013, the provincial government requested that the central government include 10 billion Korean won as part of the 2014 fiscal year budget to study and plan for the tunnel. The total length of the proposed railway is 167 km, including a 66 km surface interval from Mokpo to Haenam, a 28 km bridge section from Haenam to Bogil Island, and a 73 km stretch from Bogil to Chuja and Jeju Islands.

The provincial government predicts that by the time the project reaches completion, as many as 15 million passengers (for comparison over 14 million passengers flew between Jeju and Seoul alone in 2018 making it the world's busiest air route) will take advantage of the service in a year, with an annual savings of 42,000 won in social cost and 140,000 newly created jobs.

The idea of connecting the southwestern port city with Korea's largest island in the south was first broached in 2007 by the governors of South Jeolla and Jeju Provinces.

The project is expected to catalyze new growth in two underdeveloped regions. The undersea railway is set to be operated in conjunction with the Seoul-Mokpo express train project currently underway.

== Political difficulties ==
Residents of Jeju have raised concerns that the construction of the tunnel may impact the island's indigenous culture.

The proposal was shelved because of the high cost and technological challenge of building the world's longest underwater tunnel.

As of August 2014, it was planned to include the project in the master plan for railway infrastructure.

As Jeju Airport is beyond its capacity limits, handling mostly domestic flights, an expansion of this airport or a new airport would be the alternative to a tunnel in dealing with the growing travel demand.

== See also ==
- Korea Train Express (KTX Bullet Trains)
- Honam Line
- Honam High Speed Railway
- Tunnel boring machine
- Undersea tunnel
- Japan–Korea Undersea Tunnel
