= Sangsa-myeon =

- Township (myeon)
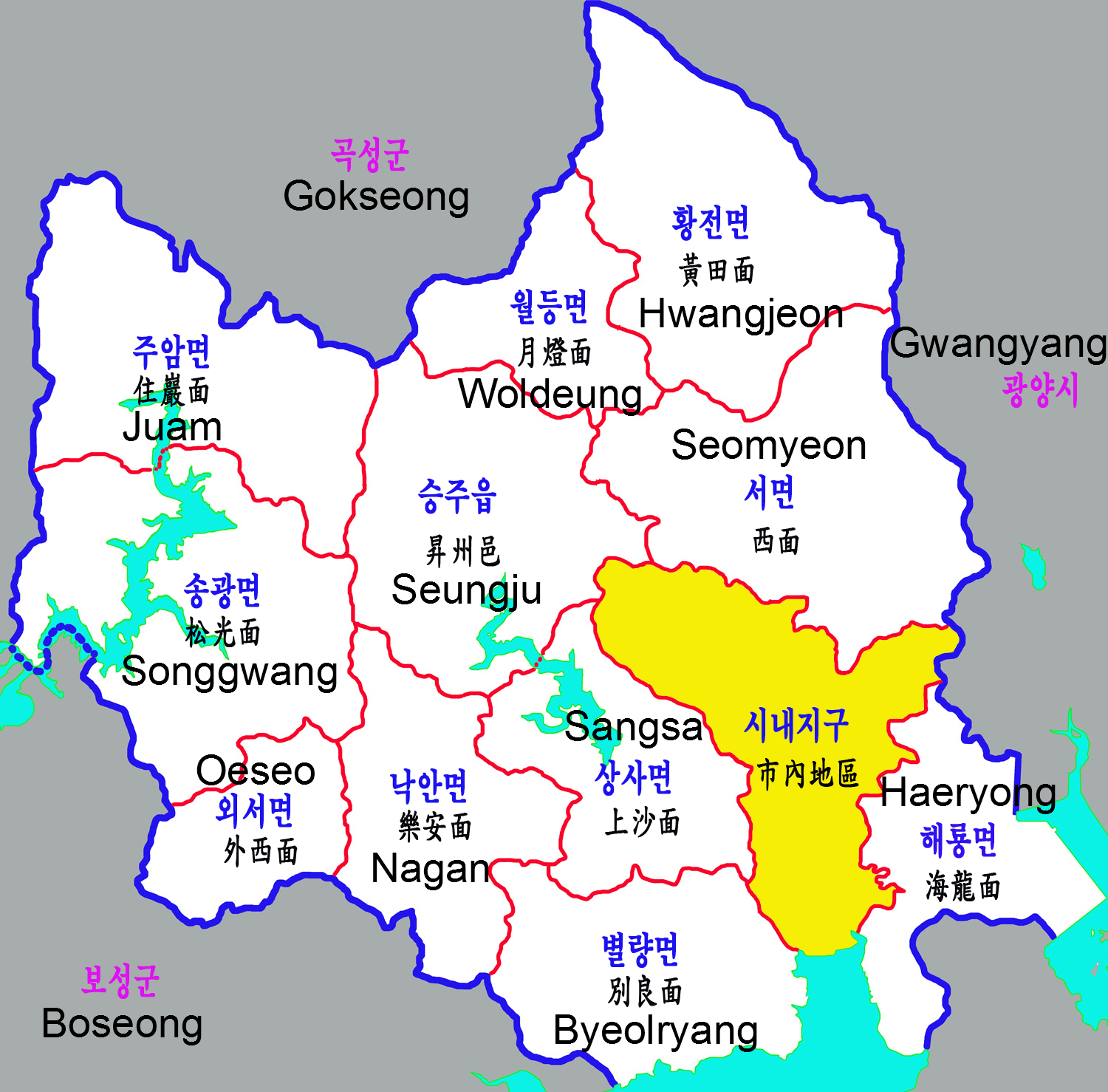
- Sangsa-myeon(상사면) in the map of Suncheon
- Coordinates: 34.95°N 127.45°E
- Country: South Korea
- Province (do): South Jeolla
- City (si): Suncheon
- Administrative divisions: 11 jurisdiction: 25 administrative district; 30 ban

Area
  - Total: 60.31 km^{2} (23.29 sq mi)

Population
  - Total: 2,989
  - Density: 49.56/km^{2} (128.4/sq mi)
- Time zone: UTC+9 (Korea Standard Time)

Korean name
- Hangul: 상사면
- Hanja: 上沙面
- RR: Sangsa-myeon
- MR: Sangsa-myŏn

Sangsa-myeon (Korean: 상사면), also called Sangsa Township or Sangsa for short, is a myeon (township) in Suncheon, a city in the South Jeolla Province, South Korea. It is located in the south-central part of the city with a total area of 60.31 square kilometres (23.29 sq mi), 6.7% of a total area of Suncheon City. The population is 2989 people, 1501 males and 1488 females, and the number of houses total 1334. The township office is located in 330, Sangsaho-gil in Heulsan-ri. There are Hyang-dong, Namje-dong, and Dosa-dong in the east of the township; Nagan-myeon in the west; Byeollyang-myeon in the south; and Seungju-eup in the north. Mountains in the township are Oknyeobong (옥녀봉) with the height 549 metres (1,801 ft) on the border to Seungju-eup, and Undongsan (운동산) with the height 465 metres (1,526 ft) on the border to Byeollyang-myeon, etc. Rivers in the township are Isacheon (이사천), Sangsacheon (상사천), Chogokcheon (초곡천), and Seokheungcheon (석흥천), etc. It also has Sangsa branch dam of Juam dam.

== History ==
It was in Gampyeong-gun (Korean: 감평군) in the Baekje. It was in Suncheon-mok (Korean: 순천목) in the Goryeo. It became Maejae-gol, Suncheon-bu (Korean: 순천부 매재골) in Joseon. It became Sangsa-myeon, Suncheon-gun (Korean: 순천군 상사면) on the 32nd year of Gojong of Joseon (1895 CE). It became Sangsa-myeon, Seungju-gun (Korean: 승주군 상사면) on 15 August 1945. It became Sangsa-myeon, Suncheon-si (Korean: 순천시 상사면) on 1 January 1995.

== Ri ==
Seo-myeon has eleven jurisdictions, twenty-five administrative districts, and thirty bans.

=== Dowol-ri ===
Dowol-ri (Korean: 도월리) has only one administrative district: Migok-ri (미곡리).

=== Maryun-ri ===
Maryun-ri (Korean: 마륜리) has two administrative districts: Maryun-ri (마륜리), and Hwasumok-ri (화수목리).

=== Bongrae-ri ===
Bongrae-ri (Korean: 봉래리) has only one administrative district: Nodong-ri (노동리).

=== Bichon-ri ===
Bichon-ri (Korean: 비촌리) has two administrative districts: Bichon-ri (비촌리), and Seodong-ri (서동리).

=== Ssangji-ri ===
Ssangji-ri (Korean: 쌍지리) has three administrative districts: Ssangji-ri (쌍지리), Eoeun-ri (어은리), and Ungok-ri (운곡리).

=== Ogok-ri ===
Ogok-ri (Korean: 오곡리) has two administrative districts: Ogok-ri (오곡리), and Yeondong-ri (연동리).

=== Yonggye-ri ===
Yonggye-ri (Korean: 용계리) has two administrative districts: Yonggye-ri (용계리), and Gugye-ri (구계리).

=== Yongam-ri ===
Yongam-ri (Korean: 용암리) has two administrative districts: Hoeryong-ri (회룡리), and Yongam-ri (용암리).

=== Eungnyeong-ri ===
Eungnyeong-ri (Korean: 응령리) has four administrative districts: Eungnyeong-ri (응령리), Geumgok-ri (금곡리), Munhwa-ri (문화리), and Seojeong-ri (서정리).

=== Chogok-ri ===
Chogok-ri (Korean: 초곡리) has two administrative districts: Chogok-ri (초곡리), and Gidong-ri (기동리).

=== Heulsan-ri ===
Heulsan-ri (Korean: 흘산리) has four administrative districts: Heulsan-ri (흘산리), Dangchon-ri (당촌리), Icheon-ri (이천리), and Dongbaek-ri (동백리). It has township office on 330, Sangsaho-gil.
