= Mado, Hwaseong =

Coordinates: 36°11′29″N 126°45′32″E

Mado
- Township of Hwaseong
- Interactive map of Mado
- Country: South Korea
- Province: Gyeonggi
- City: Hwaseong

Area
  - Total: 31.744 km^{2} (12.256 sq mi)

Population
  - Total: 6,558

Korean name
- Hangul: 마도면
- Hanja: 麻道面
- RR: Mado-myeon
- MR: Mado-myŏn

Mado (Korean: 마도면) is a township (면; myeon) in Hwaseong, Gyeonggi Province, South Korea. Its population is 6,558 as of August 2015. Mado contains ten villages, including Geumdang (금당리) and Gomo (고모리).

== Etymology ==
Mado (麻道) received its name during the early years of the Joseon dynasty, when trade with China was active through the sea, when a Chinese envoy wore a hemp cloth and rode a boat from Haemun-ri, Mado-myeon to China.

== History ==
At the end of the Joseon dynasty, the Ssangsu and Mado townships, then part of Namyang County, were merged to become Mado Township. When the Japanese colonial administration's merged administrative districts on March 1, 1914, it became part of Suwon County. Later, when the town of Suwon was upgraded to city status in 1949, Mado became part of Mado Township, part of Hwaseong County.

On March 21, 2001, Mado Township became part of the City of Hwaseong when Hwaseong was reclassified from a county to a city.
