= Bangnim-myeon =

- Township
- Location of Bangnim-myeon in South Korea
- Coordinates: 37°25′34.52″N 128°23′34.84″E
- Country: South Korea
- Province: Gangwon
- County: Pyeongchang
- Administrative divisions: 14 ri

Area
  - Total: 120.85 km^{2} (46.66 sq mi)

Population (2008)
  - Total: 2,453
- Time zone: UTC+9 (Korea Standard Time)

Korean name
- Hangul: 방림면
- Hanja: 芳林面
- RR: Bangnim-myeon
- MR: Pangnim-myŏn

Bangnim-myeon (Korean: 방림면) is a myeon (township) in Pyeongchang county of Gangwon-do South Korea. The myeon is located in northern central part of the county. The total area of Bangnim-myeon is 120.85 square kilometers, and, as of 2008, the population was 2,453 people.
