= Nam-myeon, Yeosu =

Nam-myeon
- Township (myeon)
- Interactive map of Nam-myeon
- Coordinates: 34°30′22″N 127°45′45″E
- Country: South Korea
- Province (do): South Jeolla
- City (si): Yeosu
- Administrative divisions: 9 jurisdictions: 24 administrative districts; 109 ban

Area
  - Total: 42.34 km^{2} (16.35 sq mi)

Population (Year of 2015)
  - Total: 2,885
  - Density: 68.14/km^{2} (176.5/sq mi)
- Time zone: UTC+9 (Korea Standard Time)

Korean name
- Hangul: 남면
- Hanja: 南面
- RR: Nam-myeon
- MR: Nam-myŏn

Nam-myeon (Korean: 남면), also called Nam (South) Township, or Nam for short, is a myeon (township) in Yeosu city of South Jeolla Province, South Korea. The myeon is located in south-eastern part of the city. The total area of the myeon is 42.34 square kilometres (16.35 mi^{2}), and as of 2015 the population was 2885 people. The township hall is located in Baegya-ri, at 10, Naeoejin-gil, Nam-myeon. Hwajeong-myeon and Gamak Bay are to the northwest, Dolsan-eup is to the north, Gamak Bay and Dolsan-eup is to the northeast, and the South Sea is to the south. The myeon is made up of islands, and it is second-most southern myeon in Yeosu, after Samsan-myeon.
