= Samsan Station =

Samsan Station may refer to:

- Samsan station (Jungang Line), a railway station in Yangpyeong, Gyeonggi, South Korea
- Samsan Gymnasium station, a metro station in Incheon, South Korea
- Samsan station (Unsan Line), a closed railway station in Unsan, North P'yŏngan, North Korea
