= Jindong-myeon, Paju =

Jindong-myeon
- Myeon (township)
- Location in South Korea
- Coordinates: 37.94017°N 126.80614°E
- Country: South Korea
- Province: Gyeonggi Province
- City: Paju
- Time zone: UTC+9 (Korea Standard)

Korean name
- Hangul: 진동면
- Hanja: 津東面
- RR: Jindong-myeon
- MR: Chindong-myŏn

Jindong-myeon (Korean: 진동면) is a myeon (township) under the administration of Paju, Gyeonggi Province, South Korea. As of 2019, it administers the following five villages:

- Dongpa-ri (동파리, 東坡里)
- Seogok-ri (서곡리, 瑞谷里)
- Yongsan-ri (용산리, 龍山里)
- Cho-ri (초리, 哨里)
- Hapo-ri (하포리, 下浦里)
