= Jangdan-myeon =

- Myeon (township)
- Location in South Korea
- Coordinates: 37.8779°N 126.6915°E
- Country: South Korea
- Province: Gyeonggi Province
- City: Paju
- Time zone: UTC+9 (Korea Standard)

Korean name
- Hangul: 장단면
- Hanja: 長湍面
- RR: Jangdan-myeon
- MR: Changdan-myŏn

Jangdan-myeon (Korean: 장단면) is a myeon (township) under the administration of Paju, Gyeonggi Province, South Korea. As of 2019, it administers the following eight villages:

- Nosang-ri (노상리, 盧上里)
- Noha-ri (노하리, 盧下里)
- Geogok-ri (거곡리, 巨谷里)
- Dorasan-ri (도라산리, 都羅山里)
- Seokgot-ri (석곶리, 石串里)
- Gangjeong-ri (강정리, 江井里)
- Dongjang-ri (동장리, 東場里)
- Jeongdong-ri (정동리, 井洞里)
