= Daejeon-myeon =

Coordinates: 35°16′53″N 126°53′14″E

- Hangul: 대전면
- Hanja: 大田面
- RR: Daejeon-myeon
- MR: Taejŏn-myŏn

Daejeon-myeon (Korean: 대전면) is an administrative unit of Damyang-gun, Jeollanam-do. This is located in southern part of South Korea.
