= Subi-myeon =

Coordinates: 36°48′24″N 129°13′00″E

- Hangul: 수비면
- Hanja: 首比面
- RR: Subi-myeon
- MR: Subi-myŏn

Subi-myeon is a rural township in Yeongyang County, Gyeongsangbuk-do, South Korea. Located in the rugged northeastern portion of Yeongyang County, it is the largest of the county's six divisions, covering some 217.59 square kilometers (84.01 sq mi). More than 90% of that area is unused by humans; the local population numbers only 2,016. Of these, 67% are members of farming households which are divided among 15 ri.

Local attractions include the site of a kiln from the 17th century, and a medicinal spring that is said to have cured the illness of Joseon Dynasty scholar Yakcheon Geum Hui-seong.

== See also ==
- Subdivisions of South Korea
- Geography of South Korea
