= Jindong Township, Gansu =

Jindong Township 金洞乡
- Township
- Location in Gansu
- Coordinates: 33°54′28″N 106°18′30″E
- Country: People's Republic of China
- Province: Gansu
- Prefecture-level city: Longnan
- County: Liangdang County
- Time zone: UTC+8 (China Standard)

Jindong Township (simplified Chinese: 金洞乡; traditional Chinese: 金洞鄉; pinyin: Jīndòng Xiāng) is a township under the administration of Liangdang County, Gansu, China. As of 2020, it administers the following 18 villages:

- Liqu Village (立渠村)
- Xinchao Village (新潮村)
- Yuanjiagou Village (袁家沟村)
- Miaoping Village (庙坪村)
- Wuyi Village (五一村)
- Guangou Village (贯沟村)
- Datan Village (大滩村)
- Lijia Village (李家村)
- Hejiagou Village (贺家沟村)
- Dashi Village (大史村)
- Tianba Village (田坝村)
- Hualin Village (桦林村)
- Huoshenmiao Village (火神庙村)
- Taiyang Village (太阳村)
- Renwan Village (任湾村)
- Qianchuan Village (前川村)
- Yangping Village (杨坪村)
- Sihe Village (寺合村)
