= Jindong Township, Sichuan =

Jindong Township 金洞乡
- Township
- Location in Sichuan
- Coordinates: 32°36′34″N 105°33′15″E
- Country: People's Republic of China
- Province: Sichuan
- Prefecture-level city: Guangyuan
- District: Lizhou District
- Time zone: UTC+8 (China Standard)

Jindong Township (simplified Chinese: 金洞乡; traditional Chinese: 金洞鄉; pinyin: Jīndòng Xiāng) is a township under the administration of Lizhou District, Guangyuan, Sichuan, China. As of 2020, it administers Bailonghu Residential Community (白龙湖社区) the following six villages:

- Zhanwan Village (站湾村)
- Shiqing Village (石青村)
- Qinghe Village (清河村)
- Tiangou Village (田沟村)
- Dianzi Village (店子村)
- Changyang Village (长阳村)
