= Jindong Subdistrict =

Jindong Subdistrict 金东街道
- Subdistrict
- Location in Guangdong
- Coordinates: 23°23′25″N 116°41′46″E
- Country: People's Republic of China
- Province: Guangdong
- Prefecture-level city: Shantou
- District: Jinping District
- Time zone: UTC+8 (China Standard)

Jindong Subdistrict (Chinese: 金东街道; pinyin: Jīndōng Jiēdào) is a subdistrict in Jinping District, Shantou, Guangdong, China. As of 2020, it administers the following 19 residential neighborhoods:

- Shiliuyuan (石榴园)
- Yuejiyuan (月季园)
- Haitangyuan (海棠园)
- Shuixianyuan (水仙园)
- Meiguiyuan (玫瑰园)
- Xingyuandong (杏园东)
- Xingyuan (杏园)
- Longbei (龙北)
- Dongfu (东福)
- Baiheyuan (百合园)
- Mudanyuan (牡丹园)
- Yurong (玉蓉)
- Nandun (南墩)
- Jinfeng (金凤)
- Beidun (北墩)
- Jinyu (金誉)
- Taoyuan (桃园)
- Jindun (金墩)
- Jinxing (金兴)

== See also ==
- List of township-level divisions of Guangdong
