= Samsan-myeon, Yeosu =

Samsan-myeon
- Township (myeon)
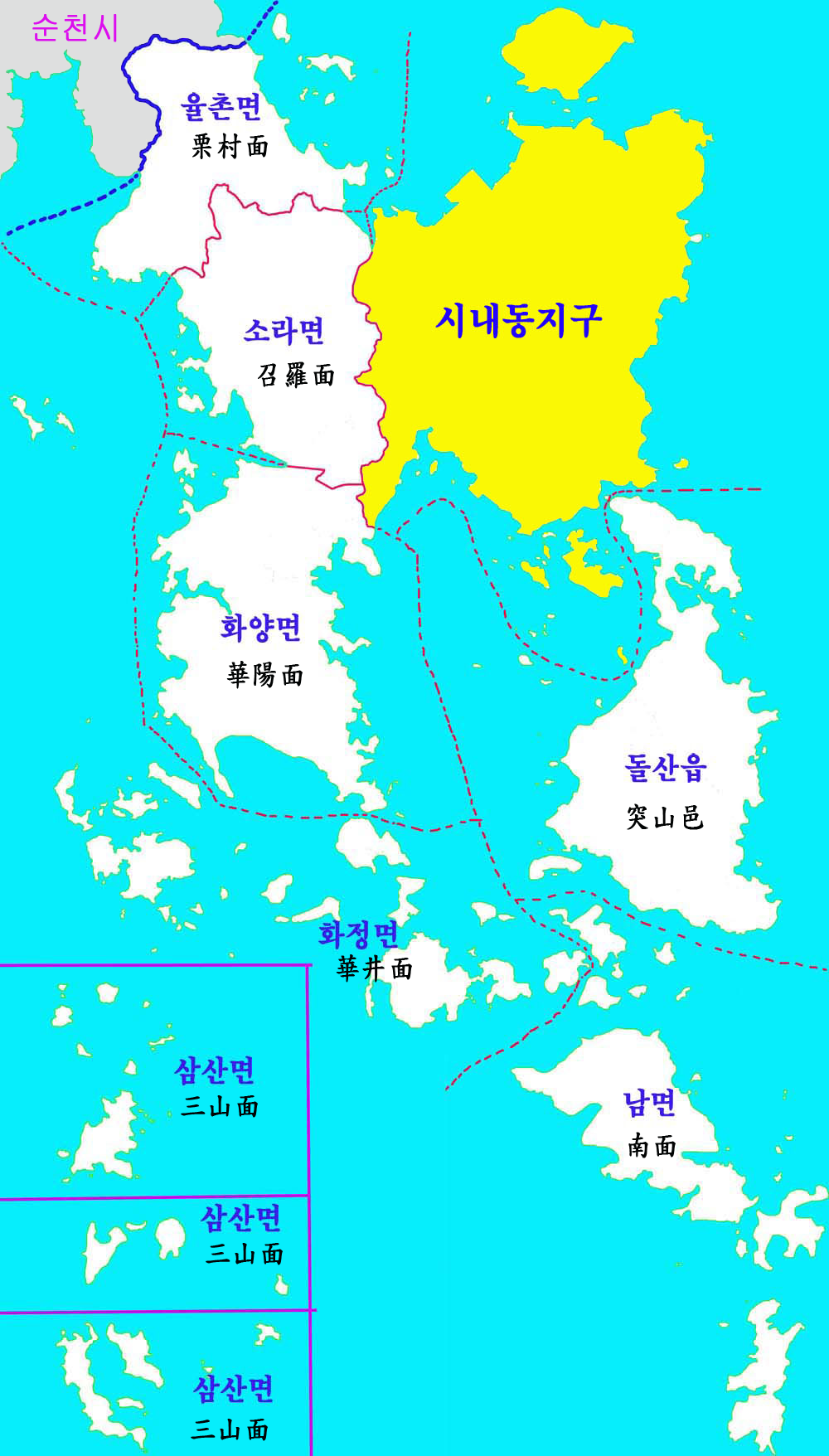
- Samsan-myeon(삼산면) in the map of Yeosu
- Coordinates: 34.026521°N 127.317769°E
- Country: South Korea
- Province (do): South Jeolla
- City (si): Yeosu
- Administrative divisions: 6 jurisdiction: 10 administrative district; 79 ban

Area
  - Total: 27.48 km^{2} (10.61 sq mi)

Population
  - Total: 2,643
  - Density: 96.18/km^{2} (249.1/sq mi)
- Time zone: UTC+9 (Korea Standard Time)

Korean name
- Hangul: 삼산면
- Hanja: 三山面
- RR: Samsan-myeon
- MR: Samsan-myŏn

Samsan-myeon (Korean: 삼산면; lit. 'three mountains'), also called Samsan Township, or Samsan for short, is a myeon (township) in Yeosu, a city in South Jeolla Province, South Korea. The township is located in the south-western part of the city with a total area of 27.48 square kilometres (10.61 sq mi). The population was recorded to be 2643 people, 1438 males and 1205 females, and the number of houses totaled 1261. The myeon office is located in 28–10, Geomun-gil in Geomun-ri. There are Jeju Province in the south-west of the myeon; mainland of Yeosu in the north-east; Goheung County in the north; and Wando County in the north-east. There is Geomundo/Baekdo zone of Dadohaehaesang National Park in Geomundo and Baekdo. The name of the myeon, Samsan, which means three mountains, is from three main islands in Geomumdo which looked like three mountains: Seodo, Dongdo, and Godo.

== History ==
It was subordinated in Heungyang-hyeon (currently, Goheung-gun) and was called Samdo (Korean: 삼도; lit. 'three islands') in 1396. Samsan-myeon was established in 1908. It was subordinate in Yeosu-gun in 1914. It was subordinate in Yeocheon-gun in 1949. Chodo and Sonjuk branch office were established in May 1965. It was subordinated in Yeosu-si on 1 April 1998, because Yeocheon-gun was merged to Yeosu-si with Yeocheon-si.

== Ri ==
Samsan-myeon has six jurisdictions and ten administrative districts.

=== Geomun-ri ===
Geomun-ri (Korean: 거문리) has one administrative district: Geomun-ri. It controls Godo of Geomundo, and Baekdo. It has myeon office.

=== Deokchon-ri ===
Deokchon-ri (Korean: 덕촌리) has one administrative district: Deokchon-ri. It controls southern part of Seodo of Geomundo.

=== Dongdo-ri ===
Dongdo-ri (Korean: 동도리) has two administrative districts: Yuchon, and Jukchon. It controls Dongdo of Geomundo, and Sambudo.

=== Seodo-ri ===
Seodo-ri (Korean: 서도리) has two administrative districts: Seodo, and Byeonchon. It controls northern part of Seodo of Geomundo.

=== Sonjuk-ri ===
Sonjuk-ri (Korean: 손죽리) has one administrative district: Sonjuk-ri. It controls Sonjukdo, Sogeomundo, Pyeongdo, and Gwangdo

=== Chodo-ri ===
Chodo-ri (Korean: 초도리) has three administrative districts: Daedong, Uiseong, and Jinmak. It controls Chodo.
