= Jeju Strait =

Strait in South Korea

- Hangul: 제주해협
- Hanja: 濟州海峽
- RR: Jeju haehyeop
- MR: Cheju haehyŏp

Jeju Strait is a strait between the Korean Peninsula (South Jeolla Province) and Jeju Island (Jeju Province). The strait is the boundary between the Sea of Japan and the Yellow Sea as defined by the International Hydrographic Organization, and is considered part of the East China Sea in Korea.

== Ecology ==
The Kuroshio current, a north-flowing ocean current, results in warm water all year round.

== See also ==
- Jeju Undersea Tunnel
- Korea Strait
- Sea of Japan
- Namhae
- Yellow Sea
- East China Sea
