= Myeon (administrative division) =

Administrative unit in South Korea

- Hangul: 면
- Hanja: 面
- RR: myeon
- MR: myŏn

A myeon, myŏn, myon, or township (Korean: 면) is an administrative unit in South Korea similar to the unit of town.

Along with town, township is of a county and some cities of fewer than 500,000 population. Myeon have smaller populations than towns and represent the rural areas of a county or city. Townships are subdivided into villages. The minimum population limit is 6,000.

== See also ==
- Administrative divisions of South Korea
