= List of towns in South Korea =

A town or eup is an administrative unit in South Korea; along with township (rural), a town (urban) is one of the divisions of a county, and of some cities with a population of less than 500,000. The main town or towns in a county—or the secondary town or towns within a city's territory—are designated as towns. Towns are subdivided into villages. In order to form a town, the minimum population required is 20,000.

== List of towns in South Korea ==
Town	Korean	Hanja	Province	Municipal	Population	Area	Founded (YYYY-MM-DD)
Ganggyeong	강경읍	江景邑	South Chungcheong	Nonsan	11,859	7.02	1931-04-01
Jochiwon	조치원읍	鳥致院邑	Sejong	none	36,885	13.32	1931-04-01
Cheorwon	철원읍	鐵原邑	Gangwon	Cheorwon County	5,821	99.21	1931-04-01
Beolgyo	벌교읍	筏橋邑	South Jeolla	Boseong County	15,972	102.36	1937-07-01
Gangjin	강진읍	康津邑	South Jeolla	Gangjin County	15,905	50.91	1937-07-01
Gampo	감포읍	甘浦邑	North Gyeongsang	Gyeongju	7,132	44.83	1937-07-01
Yecheon	예천읍	醴泉邑	North Gyeongsang	Yecheon County	18,750	47.36	1937-07-01
Geochang	거창읍	居昌邑	South Gyeongsang	Geochang County	39,462	56.30	1937-07-01
Janghang	장항읍	長項邑	South Chungcheong	Seocheon County	13,890	18.80	1938-10-01
Hadong	하동읍	河東邑	South Gyeongsang	Hadong County	11,964	29.50	1938-10-01
Goseong	고성읍	固城邑	South Gyeongsang	Goseong County	23,443	44.10	1938-10-01
Yeongdong	영동읍	永同邑	North Chungcheong	Yeongdong County	21,375	100.50	1940-11-01
Yesan	예산읍	禮山邑	South Chungcheong	Yesan County	37,897	42.80	1940-11-01
Sintaein	신태인읍	新泰仁邑	North Jeolla	Jeongeup	7,288	29.92	1940-11-01
Geumsan	금산읍	錦山邑	South Chungcheong	Geumsan County	23,979	21.60	1940-11-01
Boseong	보성읍	寶城邑	South Jeolla	Boseong County	10,477	49.07	1940-11-01
Jangheung	장흥읍	長興邑	South Jeolla	Jangheung County	15,283	55.92	1940-11-01
Uiseong	의성읍	義城邑	North Gyeongsang	Uiseong County	14,831	68.81	1940-11-01
Jumunjin	주문진읍	注文津邑	Gangwon	Gangneung	21,291	60.55	1940-11-01
Janghowon	장호원읍	長湖院邑	Gyeonggi	Icheon	16,169	60.34	1941-10-01
Hongseong	홍성읍	洪城邑	South Chungcheong	Hongseong County	43,680	30.49	1941-10-01
Gimhwa	김화읍	金化邑	Gangwon	Cheorwon County	3,539	112.25	1941-10-01
Gwangcheon	광천읍	廣川邑	South Chungcheong	Hongseong County	10,916	35.04	1942-10-01
Guryongpo	구룡포읍	九龍浦邑	North Gyeongsang	Pohang	12,558	45.04	1942-10-01
Jinyeong	진영읍	進永邑	South Gyeongsang	Gimhae	35,875	39.69	1942-10-01
Buan	부안읍	扶安邑	North Jeolla	Buan County	21,294	24.79	1943-10-01
Damyang	담양읍	潭陽邑	South Jeolla	Damyang County	14,318	29.52	1943-10-01
Jangseong	장성읍	長城邑	South Jeolla	Jangseong County	13,556	69.50	1943-10-01
Wando	완도읍	莞島邑	South Jeolla	Wando County	21,125	54.11	1943-10-01
Angang	안강읍	安康邑	North Gyeongsang	Gyeongju	33,802	138.60	1949-05-20
Okcheon	옥천읍	沃川邑	North Chungcheong	Okcheon County	30,021	47.60	1949-08-13
Jeungpyeong	증평읍	曾坪邑	North Chungcheong	Jeungpyeong County	31,112	55.40	1949-08-13
Waegwan	왜관읍	倭館邑	North Gyeongsang	Chilgok County	33,000	54.11	1949-08-13
Cheongdo	청도읍	淸道邑	North Gyeongsang	Cheongdo County	13,384	96.91	1949-08-13
Gwangyang	광양읍	光陽邑	South Jeolla	Gwangyang	47,525	52.37	1949-08-14
Gochang	고창읍	高敞邑	North Jeolla	Gochang County	20,602	42.50	1955-07-01
Haenam	해남읍	海南邑	South Jeolla	Haenam County	24,957	62.29	1955-07-01
Yeonggwang	영광읍	靈光邑	South Jeolla	Yeonggwang County	21,593	46.18	1955-07-01
Sacheon	사천읍	泗川邑	South Gyeongsang	Sacheon	16,736	29.65	1956-07-08
Eumseong	음성읍	陰城邑	North Chungcheong	Eumseong County	21,561	86.42	1956-07-08
Daejeong	대정읍	大靜邑	Jeju	Seogwipo	16,703	78.63	1956-07-08
Hallim	한림읍	翰林邑	Jeju	Jeju	19,470	91.09	1956-07-08
Samnye	삼례읍	參禮邑	North Jeolla	Wanju County	16,851	28.70	1956-07-08
Yongjin	용진읍	龍進邑	North Jeolla	Wanju County	7,649	38.50	2015-10-01
Hamyang	함양읍	咸陽邑	South Gyeongsang	Hamyang County	19,190	69.35	1957-10-21
Buyeo	부여읍	扶餘邑	South Chungcheong	Buyeo County	24,517	58.86	1960-01-01
Changnyeong	창녕읍	昌寧邑	South Gyeongsang	Changnyeong County	16,723	61.42	1960-01-01
Yeongwol	영월읍	寧越邑	Gangwon	Yeongwol County	21,788	127.30	1960-01-01
Yeonmu	연무읍	鍊武邑	South Chungcheong	Nonsan	17,522	59.71	1963-01-01
Gurye	구례읍	求禮邑	South Jeolla	Gurye County	11,768	45.79	1963-01-01
Hwasun	화순읍	和順邑	South Jeolla	Hwasun County	42,859	69.70	1963-01-01
Hampyeong	함평읍	咸平邑	South Jeolla	Hampyeong County	9,327	40.30	1963-01-01
Namji	남지읍	南旨邑	South Gyeongsang	Changnyeong County	11,343	55.25	1963-01-01
Samnangjin	삼랑진읍	三浪津邑	South Gyeongsang	Miryang	7,823	78.37	1963-01-01
Dogye	도계읍	道溪邑	Gangwon	Samcheok	13,467	164.73	1963-01-01
Hongcheon	홍천읍	洪川邑	Gangwon	Hongcheon County	35,625	107.39	1963-01-01
Munsan	문산읍	文山邑	Gyeonggi	Paju	19,177	47.23	1973-07-01
Gapyeong	가평읍	加平邑	Gyeonggi	Gapyeong County	20,071	145.04	1973-07-01
Ganghwa	강화읍	江華邑	Incheon	Ganghwa County	22,600	24.96	1973-07-01
Geojin	거진읍	巨津邑	Gangwon	Goseong County	8,062	76.75	1973-07-01
Sangdong	상동읍	上東邑	Gangwon	Yeongwol County	1,267	139.48	1973-07-01
Jeongseon	정선읍	旌善邑	Gangwon	Jeongseon County	11,638	213.67	1973-07-01
Sabuk	사북읍	舍北邑	Gangwon	Jeongseon County	5,950	47.10	1973-07-01
Seonghwan	성환읍	成歡邑	South Chungcheong	Cheonan	31,321	56.79	1973-07-01
Heunghae	흥해읍	興海邑	North Gyeongsang	Pohang	37,252	105.30	1973-07-01
Hapdeok	합덕읍	合德邑	South Chungcheong	Dangjin	10,788	51.38	1973-07-01
Sapgyo	삽교읍	揷橋邑	South Chungcheong	Yesan County	8,328	49.60	1973-07-01
Taean	태안읍	泰安邑	South Chungcheong	Taean County	26,872	87.63	1973-07-01
Boeun	보은읍	報恩邑	North Chungcheong	Boeun County	15,419	62.32	1973-07-01
Geumwang	금왕읍	金旺邑	North Chungcheong	Eumseong County	21,563	71.33	1973-07-01
Jincheon	진천읍	鎭川邑	North Chungcheong	Jincheon County	28,687	70.49	1973-07-01
Bongdong	봉동읍	鳳東邑	North Jeolla	Wanju County	23,159	46.07	1973-07-01
Doyang	도양읍	道陽邑	South Jeolla	Goheung County	10,856	33.50	1973-07-01
Geoncheon	건천읍	乾川邑	North Gyeongsang	Gyeongju	11,217	92.40	1973-07-01
Pungsan	풍산읍	豊山邑	North Gyeongsang	Andong	7,494	96.64	1973-07-01
Punggi	풍기읍	豊基邑	North Gyeongsang	Yeongju	5,118	75.92	1973-07-01
Geumho	금호읍	琴湖邑	North Gyeongsang	Yeongcheon	12,823	27.14	1973-07-01
Mungyeong	문경읍	聞慶邑	North Gyeongsang	Mungyeong	9,900	156.68	1973-07-01
Gaeun	가은읍	加恩邑	North Gyeongsang	Mungyeong	6,296	152.42	1973-07-01
Hayang	하양읍	河陽邑	North Gyeongsang	Gyeongsan	29,042	48.65	1973-07-01
Hanam	하남읍	下南邑	South Gyeongsang	Miryang	8,810	78.37	1973-07-01
Paengseong	팽성읍	彭城邑	Gyeonggi	Pyeongtaek	29,855	57.00	1979-05-01
Yeoncheon	연천읍	漣川邑	Gyeonggi	Yeoncheon County	7,288	112.86	1979-05-01
Yangpyeong	양평읍	楊平邑	Gyeonggi	Yangpyeong County	25,826	42.29	1979-05-01
Ganseong	간성읍	杆城邑	Gangwon	Goseong County	7,460	180.00	1979-05-01
Yanggu	양구읍	楊口邑	Gangwon	Yanggu County	12,138	173.62	1979-05-01
Yangyang	양양읍	襄陽邑	Gangwon	Yangyang County	11,721	32.35	1979-05-01
Inje	인제읍	麟蹄邑	Gangwon	Inje County	9,017	315.24	1979-05-01
Galmal	갈말읍	葛末邑	Gangwon	Cheorwon County	13,439	173.17	1979-05-01
Pyeongchang	평창읍	平昌邑	Gangwon	Pyeongchang County	9,940	116.31	1979-05-01
Hwacheon	화천읍	華川邑	Gangwon	Hwacheon County	8,893	291.32	1979-05-01
Hoengseong	횡성읍	橫城邑	Gangwon	Hoengseong County	19,633	72.41	1979-05-01
Seocheon	서천읍	舒川邑	South Chungcheong	Seocheon County	14,396	27.75	1979-05-01
Cheongyang	청양읍	靑陽邑	South Chungcheong	Cheongyang County	10,728	36.10	1979-05-01
Goesan	괴산읍	槐山邑	North Chungcheong	Goesan County	9,090	49.62	1979-05-01
Danyang	단양읍	丹陽邑	North Chungcheong	Danyang County	11,507	75.60	1979-05-01
Hamyeol	함열읍	咸悅邑	North Jeolla	Iksan	8,501	18.95	1979-05-01
Muju	무주읍	茂朱邑	North Jeolla	Muju County	9,192	79.14	1979-05-01
Sunchang	순창읍	淳昌邑	North Jeolla	Sunchang County	10,288	21.08	1979-05-01
Imsil	임실읍	任實邑	North Jeolla	Imsil County	6,658	67.60	1979-05-01
Jangsu	장수읍	長水邑	North Jeolla	Jangsu County	7,090	101.82	1979-05-01
Jinan	진안읍	鎭安邑	North Jeolla	Jinan County	10,474	115.97	1979-05-01
Goheung	고흥읍	高興邑	South Jeolla	Goheung County	10,477	34.94	1979-05-01
Gokseong	곡성읍	谷城邑	South Jeolla	Gokseong County	8,559	52.09	1979-05-01
Muan	무안읍	務安邑	South Jeolla	Muan County	11,340	35.67	1979-05-01
Yeongam	영암읍	靈巖邑	South Jeolla	Yeongam County	9,478	59.90	1979-05-01
Jindo	진도읍	珍島邑	South Jeolla	Jindo County	10,629	44.10	1979-05-01
Seonsan	선산읍	善山邑	North Gyeongsang	Gumi	15,469	67.01	1979-05-01
Daegaya	대가야읍	大伽倻邑	North Gyeongsang	Goryeong County	10,593	47.37	1979-05-01
Gunwi	군위읍	軍威邑	North Gyeongsang	Gunwi County	8,075	84.04	1979-05-01
Bonghwa	봉화읍	奉化邑	North Gyeongsang	Bonghwa County	12,511	74.27	1979-05-01
Seongju	성주읍	星州邑	North Gyeongsang	Seongju County	13,575	36.33	1979-05-01
Yeongdeok	영덕읍	盈德邑	North Gyeongsang	Yeongdeok County	11,179	66.08	1979-05-01
Yeongyang	영양읍	英陽邑	North Gyeongsang	Yeongyang County	7,956	130.84	1979-05-01
Ulleung	울릉읍	鬱陵邑	North Gyeongsang	Ulleung County	7,359	21.39	1979-05-01
Uljin	울진읍	蔚珍邑	North Gyeongsang	Uljin County	14,426	81.27	1979-05-01
Cheongsong	청송읍	靑松邑	North Gyeongsang	Cheongsong County	5,565	82.37	1979-05-01
Hwayang	화양읍	華陽邑	North Gyeongsang	Cheongdo County	7,376	43.17	1979-05-01
Namhae	남해읍	南海邑	South Gyeongsang	Namhae County	13,770	27.20	1979-05-01
Sancheong	산청읍	山淸邑	South Gyeongsang	Sancheong County	6,602	68.84	1979-05-01
Uiryeong	의령읍	宜寧邑	South Gyeongsang	Uiryeong County	9,661	34.30	1979-05-01
Gaya	가야읍	伽倻邑	South Gyeongsang	Haman County	18,355	41.22	1979-05-01
Hapcheon	합천읍	陜川邑	South Gyeongsang	Hapcheon County	11,821	53.04	1979-05-01
Wabu	와부읍	瓦阜邑	Gyeonggi	Namyangju	71,643	49.81	1980-12-01
Dongsong	동송읍	東松邑	Gangwon	Cheorwon County	15,940	128.83	1980-12-01
Sindong	신동읍	新東邑	Gangwon	Jeongseon County	4,017	119.84	1980-12-01
Wondeok	원덕읍	遠德邑	Gangwon	Samcheok	5,866	175.94	1980-12-01
Maepo	매포읍	梅浦邑	North Chungcheong	Danyang County	6,773	65.89	1980-12-01
Anmyeon	안면읍	安眠邑	South Chungcheong	Taean County	9,775	90.99	1980-12-01
Okgu	옥구읍	沃溝邑	North Jeolla	Gunsan	3,867	33.11	1980-12-01
Paju	파주읍	坡州邑	Gyeonggi	Paju	14,309	32.26	1980-12-01
Dolsan	돌산읍	突山邑	South Jeolla	Yeosu	14,897	71.80	1980-12-01
Daedeok	대덕읍	大德邑	South Jeolla	Jangheung County	4,307	58.08	1980-12-01
Gwansan	관산읍	冠山邑	South Jeolla	Jangheung County	6,444	71.82	1980-12-01
Geumil	금일읍	金日邑	South Jeolla	Wando County	4,011	28.10	1980-12-01
Nohwa	노화읍	盧花邑	South Jeolla	Wando County	5,911	31.86	1980-12-01
Baeksu	백수읍	白岫邑	South Jeolla	Yeonggwang County	5,521	86.50	1980-12-01
Illo	일로읍	一老邑	South Jeolla	Muan County	7,979	56.31	1980-12-01
Jido	지도읍	智島邑	South Jeolla	Sinan County	5,193	79.75	1980-12-01
Oedong	외동읍	外東邑	North Gyeongsang	Gyeongju	19,006	109.80	1980-12-01
Ocheon	오천읍	烏川邑	North Gyeongsang	Pohang	48,505	70.50	1980-12-01
Yeonil	연일읍	延日邑	North Gyeongsang	Pohang	34,115	36.01	1980-12-01
Hamchang	함창읍	咸昌邑	North Gyeongsang	Sangju	7,083	43.36	1980-12-01
Pyeonghae	평해읍	平海邑	North Gyeongsang	Uljin County	3,798	37.16	1980-12-01
Gijang	기장읍	機張邑	Busan	Gijang County	51,610	39.14	1980-12-01
Jeonggwan	정관읍	鼎冠邑	Busan	Gijang County	61,277	38.22	2015-09-23
Aewol	애월읍	涯月邑	Jeju	Jeju	27,912	202.16	1980-12-01
Gujwa	구좌읍	舊左邑	Jeju	Jeju	14,841	185.93	1980-12-01
Seongsan	성산읍	城山邑	Jeju	Seogwipo	14,048	107.79	1980-12-01
Namwon	남원읍	南元邑	Jeju	Seogwipo	18,272	188.71	1980-12-01
Jeongok	전곡읍	全谷邑	Gyeonggi	Yeoncheon County	19,780	55.20	1985-10-01
Seonggeo	성거읍	星居邑	South Chungcheong	Cheonan	22,139	31.42	1985-10-01
Seungju	승주읍	昇州邑	South Jeolla	Suncheon	3,595	93.00	1985-10-01
Hongnong	홍농읍	弘農邑	South Jeolla	Yeonggwang County	8,066	38.00	1985-10-01
Jangan	장안읍	長安邑	Busan	Gijang County	10,493	50.89	1985-10-01
Jocheon	조천읍	朝天邑	Jeju	Jeju	21,061	150.64	1985-10-01
Gohan	고한읍	古汗邑	Gangwon	Jeongseon County	5,456	52.32	1985-10-01
Jinjeop	진접읍	榛接邑	Gyeonggi	Namyangju	94,407	65.90	1989-04-01
Bubal	부발읍	夫鉢邑	Gyeonggi	Icheon	38,857	42.90	1989-04-01
Beobwon	법원읍	法院邑	Gyeonggi	Paju	14,630	71.50	1989-04-01
Yeomchi	염치읍	鹽峙邑	South Chungcheong	Asan	38,857	42.90	1990-04-01
Hwado	화도읍	和道邑	Gyeonggi	Namyangju	86,180	71.48	1991-12-01
Daesan	대산읍	大山邑	South Chungcheong	Seosan	16,515	105.03	1991-12-01
Hwawon	화원읍	花園邑	Daegu	Dalseong County	57,629	27.68	1992-03-01
Apo	아포읍	牙浦邑	North Gyeongsang	Gimcheon	8,617	53.47	1995-03-01
Nampyeong	남평읍	南平邑	South Jeolla	Naju	7,843	54.26	1995-03-01
Munsan	문산읍	文山邑	South Gyeongsang	Jinju	8,838	39.98	1995-03-01
Sinbuk	신북읍	新北邑	Gangwon	Chuncheon	7,259	57.23	1995-03-02
Munmak	문막읍	文幕邑	Gangwon	Wonju	19,045	104.30	1995-03-02
Judeok	주덕읍	周德邑	North Chungcheong	Chungju	6,276	48.44	1995-03-02
Bongyang	봉양읍	鳳陽邑	North Chungcheong	Jecheon	7,608	144.87	1995-03-02
Ungcheon	웅천읍	熊川邑	South Chungcheong	Boryeong	7,515	62.10	1995-03-02
Yugu	유구읍	維鳩邑	South Chungcheong	Gongju	9,579	101.55	1995-03-02
Unbong	운봉읍	雲峰邑	North Jeolla	Namwon	4,353	69.50	1995-03-02
Mangyeong	만경읍	萬頃邑	North Jeolla	Gimje	3,688	24.01	1995-03-02
Dong	동읍	東邑	South Gyeongsang	Changwon	23,648	59.75	1995-03-02
Naeseo	내서읍	內西邑	South Gyeongsang	Changwon	73,165	55.84	1995-03-02
Sanyang	산양읍	山陽邑	South Gyeongsang	Tongyeong	5,801	39.38	1995-03-02
Soheul	소흘읍	蘇屹邑	Gyeonggi	Pocheon	48,150	46.30	1996-02-01
Onsan	온산읍	溫山邑	Ulsan	Ulju County	24,755	38.42	1996-02-01
Eonyang	언양읍	彦陽邑	Ulsan	Ulju County	26,602	68.78	1996-02-01
Nongong	논공읍	論工邑	Daegu	Dalseong County	26,464	43.83	1996-09-01
Dasa	다사읍	多斯邑	Daegu	Dalseong County	52,273	36.66	1997-11-01
Goa	고아읍	高牙邑	North Gyeongsang	Gumi	26,464	43.83	1997-11-01
Jillyang	진량읍	珍良邑	North Gyeongsang	Gyeongsan	40,716	46.00	1997-11-01
Bongdam	봉담읍	峰潭邑	Gyeonggi	Hwaseong	63,049	42.67	1998-04-01
Naesu	내수읍	內秀邑	North Chungcheong	Cheongju	22,616	55.36	2000-01-01
Onyang	온양읍	溫陽邑	Ulsan	Ulju County	22,374	63.84	2001-03-01
Beomseo	범서읍	凡西邑	Ulsan	Ulju County	55,108	77.14	2001-03-01
Opo	오포읍	五浦邑	Gyeonggi	Gwangju	63,932	41.88	2001-03-21
Gongdo	공도읍	孔道邑	Gyeonggi	Anseong	54,531	31.94	2001-06-01
Jingeon	진건읍	眞乾邑	Gyeonggi	Namyangju	29,409	33.06	2001-09-12
Onam	오남읍	梧南邑	Gyeonggi	Namyangju	54,151	25.44	2001-09-12
Baekseok	백석읍	白石邑	Gyeonggi	Yangju	29,646	41.42	2001-10-01
Jiksan	직산읍	稷山邑	South Chungcheong	Cheonan	22,989	30.60	2002-01-01
Mokcheon	목천읍	木川邑	South Chungcheong	Cheonan	26,672	63.09	2002-01-01
Jori	조리읍	條理邑	Gyeonggi	Paju	31,712	27.44	2002-04-01
Anjung	안중읍	安仲邑	Gyeonggi	Pyeongtaek	39,574	28.69	2002-11-05
Samho	삼호읍	三湖邑	South Jeolla	Yeongam County	21,589	85.90	2003-05-01
Ujeong	우정읍	雨汀邑	Gyeonggi	Hwaseong	16,860	58.88	2003-06-14
Buksam	북삼읍	北三邑	North Gyeongsang	Chilgok County	25,440	36.75	2003-07-01
Tongjin	통진읍	通津邑	Gyeonggi	Gimpo	27,636	29.49	2004-01-01
Chowol	초월읍	草月邑	Gyeonggi	Gwangju	36,085	55.90	2004-06-21
Gonjiam	곤지암읍	昆池岩邑	Gyeonggi	Gwangju	23,364	12.85	2004-06-21
Pogok	포곡읍	蒲谷邑	Gyeonggi	Yongin	32,174	41.78	2005-10-31
Seokjeok	석적읍	石積邑	North Gyeongsang	Chilgok County	29,906	49.49	2006-10-01
Poseung	포승읍	浦升邑	Gyeonggi	Pyeongtaek	26,973	57.51	2006-12-29
Ochang	오창읍	梧倉邑	North Chungcheong	Cheongju	42,675	80.20	2007-01-01
Hyangnam	향남읍	鄕南邑	Gyeonggi	Hwaseong	54,250	49.89	2007-01-29
Baebang	배방읍	排芳邑	South Chungcheong	Asan	58,209	49.70	2009-05-01
Gochon	고촌읍	高村邑	Gyeonggi	Gimpo	24,955	29.49	2009-09-01
Songak	송악읍	松嶽邑	South Chungcheong	Dangjin	22,792	79.74	2010-01-01
Samhyang	삼향읍	三鄕邑	South Jeolla	Muan County	25,020	42.77	2011-01-01
Yangchon	양촌읍	陽村邑	Gyeonggi	Gimpo	24,966	33.65	2011-11-14
Osong	오송읍	五松邑	North Chungcheong	Cheongju	19,882	40.74	2012-01-01
Aphae	압해읍	押海邑	South Jeolla	Sinan County	7,101	67.51	2012-01-01
Ganam	가남읍	加南邑	Gyeonggi	Yeoju	16,353	75.32	2013-09-23
Namyang	남양읍	南陽邑	Gyeonggi	Hwaseong	24,253	66.89	2014-10-20
Chirwon	칠원읍	漆原邑	South Gyeongsang	Haman County	21,114	50.61	2015-01-01

== Renamed towns ==
Before	Hangul	Hanja	After	Hangul	Hanja
Uichang	의창읍	義昌邑	Heunghae	흥해읍	興海邑
Goryeong	고령읍	高靈邑	Daegaya	대가야읍	大伽倻邑
Junae	주내읍	州內邑	Paju	파주읍	坡州邑
Silchon	실촌읍	實村邑	Gonjiam	곤지암읍	昆池岩邑
Munsan	문산읍	汶山邑	Munsan	문산읍	文山邑

== See also ==
- Administrative divisions of South Korea
