= Hyoryong Sagong clan =

Korean clan from North Gyeongsang Province

- Country: Korea
- Current region: Bonghwa County
- Founder: Sikong Tu

Hyoryong Sagong clan (Korean: 효령 사공씨; Hanja: 孝令 司空氏) is one of the Korean clans. Their Bon-gwan is in Gunwi County, North Gyeongsang Province. According to the research held in 2015, the number of Hyoryong Sagong clan was 4297. Sagong clan began when Ga Sin (Hanja: 賈辛) accepted Minister of Works (Chinese: 司空; pinyin: Sīkōng), the government post, and got his surname after his post. Their founder was Sikong Tu who worked as minister of rites (禮部侍郎, Lǐbu Shilang) in Tang dynasty during Emperor Xizong of Tang’s reign. He was naturalized in Silla to avoid conflictions.

== See also ==
- Korean clan names of foreign origin
