= Dasan-myeon =

Coordinates: 35°49′31″N 128°25′36″E

- Hangul: 다산면
- Hanja: 茶山面
- RR: Dasan-myeon
- MR: Tasan-myŏn

Dasan-myeon is a subdivision of Goryeong County, Gyeongsangbuk-do, South Korea, in the county's northeast. It is composed of ten ri. Dasan-myeon looks across the Nakdong River at Daegu, and also borders Seongju County to the north. To the south it is bounded by Goryeong's Seongsan-myeon. A largely rural district, Dasan-myeon is home to about 7,400 people living on 46 square kilometers.

== See also ==
- Geography of South Korea
- Subdivisions of South Korea
