= Uiheung Ye clan =

Korean clan from North Gyeongsang Province

- Country: Korea
- Current region: Gunwi County
- Founder: Ye Nak Jeon

Uiheung Ye clan (Korean: 의흥 예씨; Hanja: 義興 芮氏) is one of the Korean clans. Their Bon-gwan is in Gunwi County, North Gyeongsang Province. According to the research held in 2000, the number of the Uiheung Ye clan was 9502. The founder was Ye Nak Jeon who came from China. The time he came to Korea has been unknown.

== See also ==
- Korean clan names of foreign origin
