= Seongju Do clan =

Seongju Do clan 성주 도씨
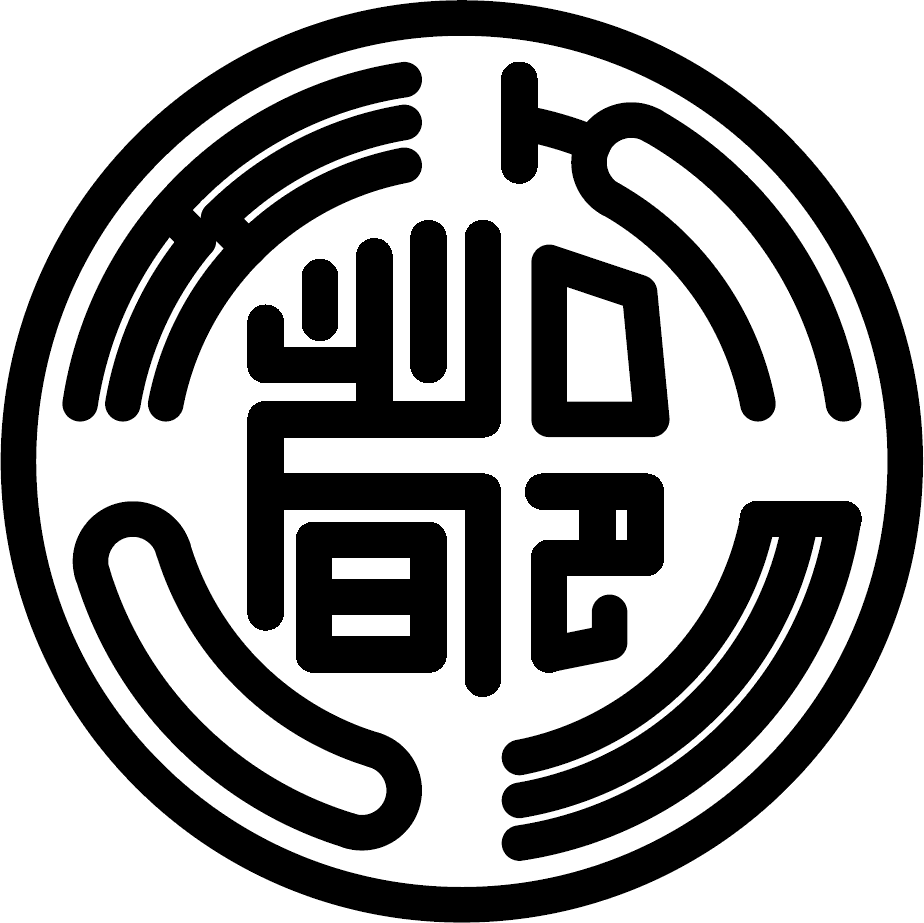
- Seal of Do clan
- Country: Korea
- Current region: Seongju County
- Founder: Do Jin
- Connected members: Do Jong-hwan; Do Ji-won; D.O. (entertainer)
- Website: http://sungjudossi.com/html/main/index.php

Seongju Do clan (Korean: 성주 도씨; Hanja: 星州 都氏), also known by Family Do (Dho, To) of Seongju, was one of the Korean clans. Their Bon-gwan is in Seongju County, North Gyeongsang Province. According to the research in 2015, the number of Seongju Do clan was 54545. Their founder was Do Jin who was a Tang dynasty's citizen and made an achievement when Goryeo was built. Do Jin was appointed as Jeongseung (Hanja: 政丞), chosen as Seongsanbuwongun(Marquess of Seongju, Hanja: 星山府院君), and was settled in Seongju.

== See also ==
- Korean clan names of foreign origin
