= Yeongkwang Industry =

Yeongkwang Industry Co, Ltd. (Korean: 영광산업; RR: Yeonggwang Saneop) is a Korean automotive, chemical, and engineering companies any. Its products include traffic signs, auto parts, acryl lamps and light cover products.

== Based in Company divisions ==
- Automotive:Buk-Ri Nongong-Eup Dalseong County, Daegu, established in 1998, the CEO is Lee Jang Ho (이장호).
- Traffic Sign & Engineering:Sangok-Ri Gochon-Myeon Gimpo, Gyeonggi-do
- Chemical:Donghyang-Ri Yangseong-Myeon Anseong, Gyeonggi-do, established in 1991.

== Department products ==
=== Automotive (Dalseong, Daegu) ===
- Pulley & Bearing Assembly
- Clutch & Coil Housing Assembly
- Hub & Clutch Assembly
- Swash Plate & Shaft Assembly / Piston
- Control Valve
- Piston Shoe

=== Traffic Sign & Engineering (Gimpo, Gyeonggi-do) ===
- Stainless Road Brighter
- Aluminium Sign Plate
- Traffic Safety Sign Plate
- Information Sign plate
- Turning Direct Sign Plate
- Road Assistant Products
- Lining Light
- Work Information Sign
- Fire Dept Continuous Sign
- Fire Dept Equipment Box
- Working Sign
- Safety Policy Sign
- Electric Continuous Sign
- Total Information Plate
- Parking Continuous Sign
- Flex Sign
- Image Sign
- Construction Yard Sign
- Non-Crash Record Plate
- Floor Sign
- Safety Confidence Sign
- Safety Jacket
- PE Fence
- PE Drum

=== Chemical (Anseong, Gyeonggi-do) ===
- Acryl Lamp & Light Cover

== Global corporate ==
- Kuala Lumpur (Automotive division)

== See also ==
- Economy of South Korea
- Automotive
- Chemical
- Engineering
