= Pyeonghae Gu clan =

Korean clan from North Gyeongsang Province

- Country: Korea
- Current region: Uljin County
- Founder: Gu Dae rim

Pyeonghae Gu clan (Korean: 평해 구씨; Hanja: 平海 丘氏) is one of the Korean clans. Their Bon-gwan is in Uljin County, North Gyeongsang Province. According to the research held in 2015, the number of Pyeonghae Gu clan’s member was 15297. Their founder was Gu Dae rim who was a general in Tang dynasty. He had a shipwreck on the Sea of Japan on his way to Japan as an envoy in Tang dynasty. Then, he cast ashore in North Gyeongsang Province and was settled in Mipo (Hanja: 美浦) situated in the south of the ocean.

== See also ==
- Korean clan names of foreign origin
