= Sangun-myeon =

Myeon or a township in Bonghwa county of North Gyeongsang province in South Korea

- Hangul: 상운면
- Hanja: 祥雲面
- RR: Sangun-myeon
- MR: Sangun-myŏn

Sangun-myeon (Korean: 상운면) is a myeon or a township in Bonghwa county of North Gyeongsang province in South Korea. The total area of Sangun-myeon is 58.52 square kilometers, and, as of 2006, the population was 2,070 people. Sangun-myeon is further divided into eight ri, or small villages.

Hanul-ri in Sangun-myeon is also the setting of the 2008 documentary film Old Partner, the highest grossing independent film in South Korea.

== Administrative divisions ==
- Gagok-ri (가곡리)
- Ungye-ri (운계리)
- Munchon-ri (문촌리)
- Hanul-ri (하눌리)
- Toil-ri (토일리)
- Gucheon-ri (구천리)
- Seolmae (설매리)
- Sinra-ri (신라리)

== Schools ==
- Sangun Elementary School (상운초등학교) in Gagok-ri
- Sangun Middle School (상운중학교) in Gagok-ri
