= Myeonsan =

Mountain in South Korea

Highest point
- Elevation: 1,245.2 m (4,085 ft)

Geography
- Location: South Korea

Korean name
- Hangul: 면산
- Hanja: 綿山
- RR: Myeonsan
- MR: Myŏnsan

Myeonsan (Korean: 면산) is a South Korean mountain that sits between the cities of Taebaek and Samcheok in Gangwon Province and Bonghwa County, North Gyeongsang Province. It has an elevation of 1,245.2 m (4,085 ft).

== See also ==
- List of mountains in Korea
