= 奉化 =

奉化 may refer to:

- Bonghwa (봉화), North Gyeongsang, South Korea
- Fenghua, Ningbo, Zhejiang, China

== See also ==
- The dictionary definition of 奉 at Wiktionary
- The dictionary definition of 化 at Wiktionary
