= Geunyoung Industry =

Korean auto parts company in Nowon-Dong, Buk-Gu Daegu

Geunyoung Industry Co, Ltd. (Korean: 근영산업) is a Korean auto parts company headquartered in Nowon-Dong, Buk-Gu Daegu established in 1977. It makes automotive spare parts products, similar to Hyundai Mobis and SL Corp. The "Geunyoung Industry" CEO is brother by Yoo Deok Sool & Yoo Yeong Sool (유덕술, 유영술 형제).

== Group families ==
- Geunyoung Industry Co, Ltd.
- Geunyoung Tech Co, Ltd.
- Geunyoung Precision Co, Ltd.

== History ==
- 1977: Geunyoung Industry Co, Ltd. (Nowon-Dong Buk-Gu Daegu) was founded
- 1980: Expanded and moved (Chimsan 1-gu)
- 1988: Approved to be auto joint enterprise in Ssangyong Motor Company
- 1989: Introduce Quality Control
- 1990: Introduce KS mark
- 1991: Set up 2 Rubber Injection in automation
- 1993: Build laboratory, install machinery and tools companion open
- 2000: Expanded and moved (Nowon 3-ga)
- 2003: Source by Korea company

== See also ==
- Economy of South Korea
- Auto parts
- Automotive
