= Seongju Hwang clan =

Korean clan from North Gyeongsang Province

- Country: Korea
- Current region: Seongju County
- Founder: Hwang Se deuk

Seongju Hwang clan (Korean: 성주 황씨; Hanja: 星州 黃氏) is a Korean clas. Their Bon-gwan is in Seongju County, North Gyeongsang Province. Hwang Rak (Hanja: 黄洛), a minister of the Han dynasty, began the Hwang clan in Korea after he was cast ashore when traveling to Vietnam in 28 CE and then naturalized in Silla. Their founder was Hwang Se deuk, who was the 17th descendant of Hwang Seok ju, who themself was a descendant of Hwang Rak and worked as a government post as a great general (Hanja: 柱国) during the Goryeo period.

== See also ==
- Korean clan names of foreign origin
