= Pyeonghae =

- Town
- Interactive map of Pyeonghae
- Coordinates: 36°43′32.18″N 129°26′29.82″E
- Country: South Korea
- Province: North Gyeongsang
- County: Uljin
- Incorporation: 1 December 1980

Area
  - Total: 37.16 km^{2} (14.35 sq mi)

Population
  - Total: 3,798

Korean name
- Hangul: 평해읍
- Hanja: 平海邑
- RR: Pyeonghae-eup
- MR: P'yŏnghae-ŭp

Pyeonghae (Korean: 평해읍) is a South Korean town. It is administered as part of Uljin County in North Gyeongsang Province.

== Name ==
Pyeonghae's name means "Peaceful Sea(s)". It appears in 19th-century sources as "Pingai", "Pingai Harbor", and "Ping-hai Harbor".

== Geography ==
Pyeonghae lies on the north bank of the Namdae (南大川, "Southern Great River"), about a mile inland from its confluence with the Sea of Japan on the eastern shore of the Korean Peninsula. Its harbor was formed by a conical island, which sheltered an anchorage in the Namdae estuary.

== History ==
During the 19th century, Pyeonghae was reckoned one of the primary harbors on Korea's eastern shore.

Pyeonghae Village (Pyeonghae-ri) was officially promoted to town status on 1 December 1980.

== See also ==
- List of towns in South Korea
