= Bonghwa station =

Railway station in South Korea

봉화
Bonghwa
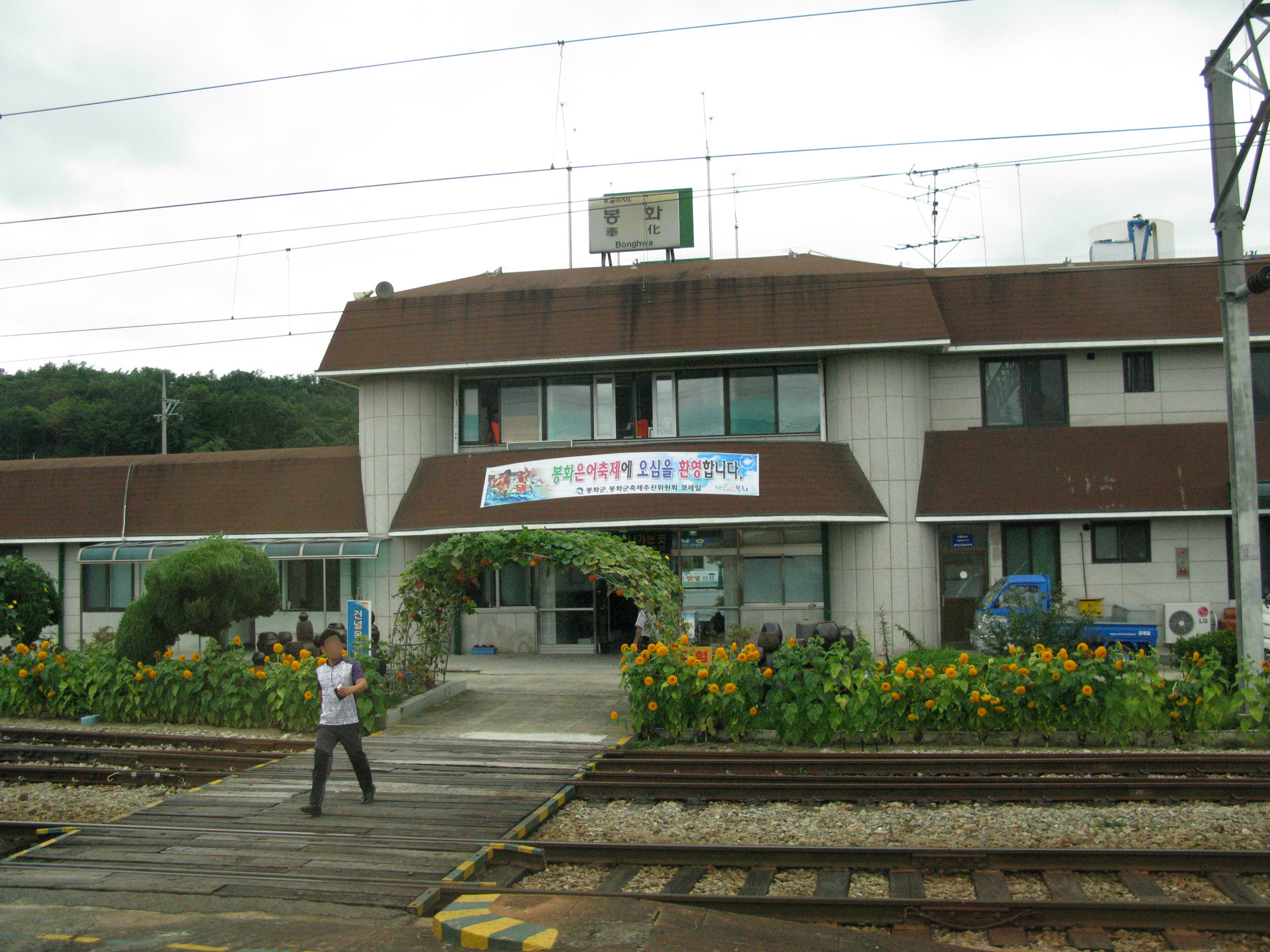

Korean name
- Hangul: 봉화역
- Hanja: 奉化驛
- Revised Romanization: Bonghwayeok
- McCune–Reischauer: Ponghwayŏk

General information
- Location: Haejeo-ri, Bonghwa-eup, Bonghwa, North Gyeongsang; South Korea
- Coordinates: 36°53′29.28″N 128°43′37.6″E
- Operator: Korail
- Line: Yeongdong Line
- Platforms: 1
- Tracks: 2

Construction
- Structure type: Aboveground

History
- Opened: February 1, 1950
Location

Bonghwa station (Korean: 봉화역) is a railway station on the Yeongdong Line. It is located at Bonghwa, North Gyeongsang
