= SL Corporation =

South Korean auto parts company

SL Corporation 에스엘코포레이션
- Industry: Automotive
- Founded: 1954
- Headquarters: Jillyang-eup, Gyeongsan, South Korea
- Area served: Worldwide
- Key people: Choong Kon Lee (Chairman, Co-Chief Executive Officer); Seong Yeop Lee (Co-Chief Executive Officer)
- Products: Chassis systems; lamp systems; mirror systems; and front end module systems, including bumper beams, horns, bonnet-latches and sensors
- Website: www.slworld.com

SL Corporation (Korean: 에스엘코포레이션) is a multinational automotive components manufacturing company headquartered in Gyeongsan, South Korea. It has manufacturing plants in Asia-Pacific, India, Europe, and the United States. Annual turn-over is around 4.0 billion USD as group basis.

== History ==
SL Corporation's origins date back to 1954 and the establishment of Samlip Motor Works as a manufacturer of bicycle parts. In 1968 the company was incorporated into Samlip Industrial Co. Ltd. (삼립산업) and in 1969 it began manufacturing head lamps for Hyundai Motors. The name was finally changed to SL Corporation in 2004 under the leadership of Lee Choong Kon, CEO. Currently SL Corporation manufactures various products for the automotive industry. SL Corporation received the GM Supplier of the Year award for sixteen straight years (1997–2012) as well as the Five Star quality certificate from Hyundai-Kia Motors.

== Products ==
- Exterior Lighting Systems
- Suspension System Components
- Chassis & Steering System Components
- Door System Components
- Power Train System Components
- Front End Modules
- Mirror

== Customers ==
- General Motors
- Hyundai
- Kia Motors
- SsangYong Motor Company
- GM Daewoo
- Chrysler
- Subaru
- Honda
- Ford India
- BMW
- Ford
- Stellantis

== Major competitors ==
- REBO
- Valeo
- Hyundai Mobis
- Sungwoo Automotive
- Mopar
- AC Delco
- Hella

== See also ==
- Economy of South Korea
- Auto parts
- SL Lumax Limited
