= Yeonil =

Coordinates: 36°00′N 129°21′E

- Town
- Interactive map of Yeonil
- Country: South Korea
- Province: North Gyeongsang
- City: Pohang
- Non-autonomous District: Nam-gu
- Administrative divisions: 13 beopjeongni, 30 hangjeongni and ? ban

Area
  - Total: 36.01 km^{2} (13.90 sq mi)

Population (2015.5)
  - Total: 34,560
  - Density: 959.7/km^{2} (2,486/sq mi)
- Website: Yeonil Town

Korean name
- Hangul: 연일읍
- Hanja: 延日邑
- RR: Yeonil-eup
- MR: Yŏnil-ŭp

Yeonil (Korean: 연일읍) is a town, or eup in Nam-gu, Pohang, North Gyeongsang Province, South Korea. The township Yeonil-myeon had been upgraded to the town Yeonil-eup in 1980. Yeonil Town Office is located in Geojeong-ri.

== Communities ==
Yeonil-eup is divided into 13 villages (ri).

	Hangul	Hanja
Saengji-ri	생지리	生旨里
Goejeong-ri	괴정리	槐亭里
Dongmun-ri	동문리	東門里
Ocheon-ri	오천리	烏川里
Yugang-ri	유강리	柳江里
Jamyeong-ri	자명리	自明里
Hakjeon-ri	학전리	鶴田里
Daljeon-ri	달전리	達田里
Jungmyeong-ri	중명리	中明里
Jungdan-ri	중단리	中丹里
Taekjeon-ri	택전리	宅前里
Inju-ri	인주리	絪珠里
Ubok-ri	우복리	牛伏里
