= Gunwi-eup =

Gunwi
- Town
- Panoramic view of Gunwi-eup
- Interactive map of Gunwi
- Country: South Korea
- Metropolitan city: Daegu
- County: Gunwi County
- Administrative divisions: 17 beopjeongni, 34 hangjeongni and 109 ban

Area
  - Total: 84.05 km^{2} (32.45 sq mi)

Population (2020)
  - Total: 7,940
  - Density: 94.5/km^{2} (245/sq mi)
- Website: Gunwi Town

Korean name
- Hangul: 군위읍
- Hanja: 軍威邑
- RR: Gunwi-eup
- MR: Kunwi-ŭp

Gunwi-eup (Korean: 군위읍) is a town, or eup in Gunwi County of the Daegu Metropolitan City in South Korea. The township Gunwi-myeon was upgraded to the town Gunwi-eup in 1979. The Gunwi County office and Gunwi Town office are located in Dongbu-ri.

== Communities ==
Gunwi-eup is divided into 17 villages (ri).

	Hangul	Hanja
Dongbu-ri	동부리	東部里
Seobu-ri	서부리	西部里
Geumgu-ri	금구리	金鳩里
Museong-ri	무성리	武成里
Suseo-ri	수서리	水西里
Sajik-ri	사직리	社稷里
Naeryang-ri	내량리	內良里
Oeryang-ri	외량리	外良里
Daeheung-ri	대흥리	大興里
Samnyeong-ri	삽령리	鈒嶺里
Daebuk-ri	대북리	大北里
Ogok-ri	오곡리	梧谷里
Jeong-ri	정리	政里
Hagok-ri	하곡리	下谷里
Yongdae-ri	용대리	龍坮里
Sanggok-ri	상곡리	上谷里
Gwanghyeon-ri	광현리	廣峴里

== Demographics ==
Historical population
Year	Pop.	±%
1970	14,287	—
1980	12,710	−11.0%
2000	8,914	−29.9%
2010	6,502	−27.1%
2020	7,940	+22.1%
Source: MODS

As of 2024, Gunwi has a population of 7,606, of which 51.7% are male and 48.3% are female, compared to the national average of 50.1% and 49.9% respectively. People under 15 years old make up 7.1% of the population, and people over 65 years old make up 32.9%, compared to the national average of 10.5% and 19.5% respectively. Foreigners make up 4.4% of the total population, compared to 3.9% nationwide.
