= Nongong =

- Town
- Country: South Korea
- Province: Daegu
- County: Dalseong County
- Administrative divisions: 1 chuljangso, 9 beopjeongni, 26 hangjeongni and 177 ban

Area
  - Total: 43.87 km^{2} (16.94 sq mi)

Population (2012.12)
  - Total: 24,778
  - Density: 564.8/km^{2} (1,463/sq mi)
- Website: Nongong Town

Korean name
- Hangul: 논공읍
- Hanja: 論工邑
- RR: Nongong-eup
- MR: Non'gong-ŭp

Nongong (Korean: 논공읍) is a town, or eup in Dalseong County, Daegu, South Korea. The township Nongong-myeon was upgraded to the town Nongong-eup in 1996. Dalseong County Office and Nongong Town Office are located in Geumpo-ri. Nam-ri and Buk-ri, which include Dalseong Industrial Complex 1, are crowded with people.

== Communities ==
Nongong-eup is divided into 9 villages (ri).

	Hangul	Hanja
Noi-ri	노이리	蘆耳里
Geumpo-ri	금포리	金圃里
Samni-ri	삼리리	三狸里
Wicheon-ri	위천리	渭川里
Sang-ri	상리	上里
Ha-ri	하리	下里
Nam-ri	남리	南里
Buk-ri	북리	北里
Bolli-ri	본리리	本里里
