= Jaesan-myeon =

Administrative division in North Gyeongsang, South Korea

- Hangul: 재산면
- Hanja: 才山面
- RR: Jaesan-myeon
- MR: Chaesan-myŏn

Jaesan-myeon (Korean: 재산면) is a myeon or a township in Bonghwa county of North Gyeongsang province in South Korea. The total area of Jaesan-myeon is 126.01 square kilometers, and, as of 2006, the population was 1,692 people. Jaesan-myeon is further divided into five "ri", or small villages.

== Administrative divisions ==
- Hyeondong-ri (현동리)
- Nammyeon-ri (남면리)
- Dongmyeon-ri (동면리)
- Galsan-ri (갈산리)
- Sang-ri (상리)

== Schools ==
- Jaesan Elementary School(재산초등학교) in Hyeondong-ri.
- Jaesan Middle School (재산중학교) in Hyeondong-ri.
