= Naeseo =

Place in South Korea

Coordinates: 35.236°N 128.506°E

- Hangul: 내서읍
- Hanja: 內西邑
- RR: Naeseo-eup
- MR: Naesŏ-ŭp

Naeseo-eup (Korean: 내서읍) is a town or eup located north-west of Changwon City in South Korea. Its districts include Jung-ri, Hogye-ri, Sanggok-ri, Wongye-ri and Samgye-ri, which is considered the downtown area.

The Namhae Expressway Branch 1 goes towards Changwon and Masan. The Gyeongnam-Daero highway leads to the southern end of Masan. This road also follows the river through Naeseo-eup. A path for cyclists and pedestrians follows the river for many kilometers.

It is an industrial area and the home of Masan University.
