= Seongju-eup =

Seongju
- Town
- Panoramic view of Seongju-eup
- Interactive map of Seongju
- Country: South Korea
- Province: North Gyeongsang
- County: Seongju County
- Administrative divisions: 10 beopjeongni, 35 hangjeongni and 151 ban

Area
  - Total: 36.34 km^{2} (14.03 sq mi)

Population (2014.12)
  - Total: 14,092
  - Density: 387.8/km^{2} (1,004/sq mi)
- Website: Seongju Town

Korean name
- Hangul: 성주읍
- Hanja: 星州邑
- RR: Seongju-eup
- MR: Sŏngju-ŭp

Seongju-eup (Korean: 성주읍) is a town, or eup in Seongju County, North Gyeongsang Province, South Korea. The township Seongju-myeon was upgraded to the town Seongju-eup in 1979. Seongju County Office is located in Gyeongsan-ri which is crowded with people, and Seongju Town Office is in Seongsan-ri.

== Communities ==
Seongju-eup is divided into 10 villages (ri).

	Hangul	Hanja
Gyeongsan-ri	경산리	京山里
Daeheung-ri	대흥리	大興里
Daehwang-ri	대황리	大皇里
Seongsan-ri	성산리	星山里
Samsan-ri	삼산리	三山里
Haksan-ri	학산리	鶴山里
Geumsan-ri	금산리	錦山里
Yesan-ri	예산리	禮山里
Baekjeon-ri	백전리	栢田里
Yongsan-ri	용산리	龍山里
