= Chunyang-myeon, Bonghwa County =

Township in North Gyeongsang, South Korea

- Hangul: 춘양면
- Hanja: 春陽面
- RR: Chunyang-myeon
- MR: Ch'unyang-myŏn

Chunyang-myeon (Korean: 춘양면) is a myeon, or a township, in Bonghwa, North Gyeongsang in South Korea. The total area of Chunyang-myeon is 167.28 square kilometers, and, as of 2006, the population was 5,154 people. Chunyang-myeon is further divided into nine "ri", or small villages.

== Administrative divisions ==
- Uiyang-ri (의양리)
- Haksan-ri (학산리)
- Seodong-ri (서동리)
- Seokhyeon-ri (석현리)
- Aedang-ri (애당리)
- Dosim-ri (도심리)
- Seobyeok-ri (서벽리)
- Uguchi-ri (우구치리)
- Soro-ri (소로리)

== Schools ==
- Chunyang Elementary School(춘양초등학교) in Uiyang-ri.
- Seobyeok Elementary School (서벽초등학교) in Seobyeok-ri.
- Seobyeok Middle School (서벽중학교) in seobyeok-ri
- Chunyang Middle School (춘양중학교) in Seodong-ri with a branch facility in Seobyeok-ri.
- Korea forest science high school (한국산림과학고) in Seodong-ri.
