= Heunghae =

Coordinates: 36°07′N 129°21′E

- Town
- Interactive map of Heunghae
- Country: South Korea
- Province: North Gyeongsang
- City: Pohang
- Non-autonomous District: Buk-gu
- Administrative divisions: 30 beopjeongni, 58 hangjeongni and 379 ban

Area
  - Total: 105.3 km^{2} (40.7 sq mi)

Population (2015.5)
  - Total: 34,328
  - Density: 326.0/km^{2} (844.3/sq mi)
- Website: Heunghae Town

Korean name
- Hangul: 흥해읍
- Hanja: 興海邑
- RR: Heunghae-eup
- MR: Hŭnghae-ŭp

Heunghae (Korean: 흥해읍) is a town, or eup in Buk-gu, Pohang, North Gyeongsang Province, South Korea. The township Uichang-myeon was upgraded to the town Uichang-eup in 1980, and it was renamed Heunghae-eup in 1983. Heunghae Town Office is located in Okseong-ri.

== Communities ==
Heunghae-eup is divided into 30 villages (ri).

	Hangul	Hanja
Maesan-ri	매산리	梅山里
Buksong-ri	북송리	北松里
Masan-ri	마산리	馬山里
Okseong-ri	옥성리	玉城里
Yakseong-ri	약성리	藥城里
Hakseong-ri	학성리	學城里
Namseong-ri	남성리	南城里
Seongnae-ri	성내리	城內里
Jungseong-ri	중성리	中城里
Mangcheon-ri	망천리	望泉里
Namsong-ri	남송리	南松里
Gokgang-ri	곡강리	曲江里
Yonghan-ri	용한리	龍汗里
Umok-ri	우목리	牛目里
Jukcheon-ri	죽천리	竹川里
Yonggok-ri	용곡리	龍谷里
Yangbaek-ri	양백리	兩白里
Deokseong-ri	덕성리	德城里
Deokjang-ri	덕장리	德壯里
Yongjeon-ri	용전리	龍田里
Yongcheon-ri	용천리	龍泉里
Geumjang-ri	금장리	金壯里
Heungan-ri	흥안리	興安里
Chilpo-ri	칠포리	七浦里
Odo-ri	오도리	烏島里
Chogok-ri	초곡리	草谷里
Hakcheon-ri	학천리	鶴川里
Seonggok-ri	성곡리	城谷里
Iin-ri	이인리	里仁里
Daeryeon-ri	대련리	大蓮里
