= Seokpo-myeon =

- Hangul: 석포면
- Hanja: 石浦面
- RR: Seokpo-myeon
- MR: Sŏkp'o-myŏn

Seokpo-myeon (Korean: 석포면) is a myeon or a township in Bonghwa county of North Gyeongsang province in South Korea. The total area of Seokpo-myeon is 150.1 square kilometers, and, as of 2006, the population was 2,144 people. Seokpo-myeon is further divided into three "ri", or small villages.

Seokpo-myeon is the southernmost breeding habitat of the branchymystax lenok, a rare freshwater fish. Due to this, the breeding grounds in Seokpo-myeon were designated as Korean Natural Monument No. 74.

== Administrative divisions ==
- Seokpo-ri (석포리)
- Daehyeon-ri (대현리)
- Seungbu-ri (승부리)

== Schools ==
- Seokpo Elementary School (석포초등학교) in Seokpo-ri with a branch facility in Daehyeon-ri.
- Seokpo Middle School (석포중학교) in Seokpo-ri.
