= Myeongho-myeon =

- Hangul: 명호면
- Hanja: 明湖面
- RR: Myeongho-myeon
- MR: Myŏngho-myŏn

Myeongho-myeon (Korean: 명호면) is a myeon or a township in Bonghwa county of North Gyeongsang province in South Korea. The total area of Myeongho-myeon is 114.38 square kilometers, and, as of 2006, the population was 2,428 people. Myeongho-myeon is further divided into eight "ri", or small villages.

Cheongnyang Mountain Provincial Park is within Myeongho-myeon and is home to the famous Cheongnyang Temple and Mountain.

== Administrative divisions ==
- Docheon-ri (도천리)
- Samdong-ri (삼동리)
- Yanggok-ri (양곡리)
- Gogam-ri (고감리)
- Pungho-ri (풍호리)
- Gogye-ri (고계리)
- Bukgok-ri (북곡리)
- Gwanchang-ri (관창리)

== Schools ==
- Myeongho Elementary School(명호초등학교) in Docheon-ri with a branch facility in Bukgok-ri.
- Myeongho Middle School (명호중학교) in Docheon-ri.
