= History of Daegu =

Throughout and before recorded history, Daegu has served as a nexus of transportation, lying as it does at the junction of the Geumho and Nakdong rivers. During the Joseon dynasty, the city was the administrative, economic and cultural centre of the entire Gyeongsang region, a role largely taken over now by Busan in South Gyeongsang Province.

== Prehistory and early history ==
Archaeological investigations in the Greater Daegu area have revealed a large number of settlements and burials of the prehistoric Mumun Pottery Period (c. 1500-300 BC.). In fact, some of the earliest evidence of Mumun settlement in Gyeongsang Province have been unearthed in Daegu at Siji-dong and Seobyeon-dong (YUM 1999a). The Dongcheon-dong site is a substantial village of the Middle Mumun (c. 850-550 BC.) and contains the remains of many prehistoric pit houses and agricultural fields. Megalithic burials (dolmens) have also been found in large numbers in Daegu (YICP 2002).

Daegu was absorbed into the kingdom of Silla no later than the 5th century.

== Shilla ==
Shilla defeated the other Three Kingdoms of Korea in the late 7th century, with assistance from Tang China. Shortly thereafter, the king of Shilla considered moving the capital from Gyeongju to Daegu, but was unable to do so. We know of this incident through only a single line in the Samguk Sagi, but it is presumed that it indicates the entrenched resistance of the Gyeongju political elites to such a move.

In the late 1990s archaeologists excavated a large-scale fortified Shilla site in Dongcheon-dong, Buk-gu (FPCP 2000). The site at Locality 2 consists of the remains of 39 raised-floor buildings enclosed by a formidable ditch-and-palisade system. The excavators hypothesize that the fortified site was a permanent military encampment or barracks. Archaeologists also uncovered a large Shilla village dating to the 6th to 7th centuries at Siji-dong (YUM 1999b).

The city was given its current name in 757.

Most relics of the Shilla period are found on Palgongsan around Donghwasa temple in northern Daegu. Donghwasa itself dates from the Shilla period, as does the pagoda of King Minae.

== Later Three Kingdoms ==
During the Later Three Kingdoms period, 890–935, Daegu was initially aligned with Later Baekje. In 927, northern Daegu was the site of the Battle of Gong Mountain between the forces of Goryeo under Wang Kŏn and those of Later Baekje under Kyŏn Hwŏn. In this battle, the forces of Goryeo were crushed and Wang Kŏn himself was saved only by the heroism of his general Sin Sung-gyŏm. However, it appears that the conduct of the Later Baekje forces at this time changed local sympathies to favor Wang Geon.

Numerous place-names and local legends around Daegu still bear witness to the historic battle of 927. Among these are "Ansim," which literally means "peace of mind," said to be the first place where Wang Kŏn dared to stop after escaping the battle, and "Banwol," or half-moon, where he is said to have stopped and admired the moon before returning to Goryeo. A statue commemorating the battle now stands in northern Daegu, as does a memorial to Sin Sung-gyŏm.

== Goryeo ==
The first edition of the Tripitaka Koreana was stored in Daegu, at the temple of Buinsa. However, this edition was destroyed when the temple was sacked in 1254, during the Mongol invasions of Korea.

== Joseon ==
Always an important transportation center, in the Joseon dynasty Daegu lay on the Great Yeongnam Road which ran between Seoul and Busan. It lay at the junction of this arterial road and the roads to Gyeongju and Jinju.

In 1601, Daegu became the administrative capital of Gyeongsang province, and the city has been the capital of North Gyeongsang province since that province's formation in 1896.

Daegu's first regular markets were established during the late Joseon period. The most famous of these, and the only one to still be operating, is the Yangnyeongsi herbal medicine market. This became a center of herbal trade in Joseon, and even attracted buyers from neighboring countries. Traders from Japan, who were not permitted to leave the Nakdong River valley, hired messengers to visit the market on their behalf.

== Korean Empire ==
Korea began to open to the world in the late 19th century. In 1895, Daegu became the site of one of the country's first modern post offices, as part of the reforms pushed by the Japanese after the murder of Queen Min.

Beginning in the late 1890s, many Japanese merchants and workers came to Daegu, which lay on the newly constructed Gyeongbu Line railroad connecting Seoul and Busan.

In 1905, the old fortress wall was surreptitiously destroyed. Only one portion of this, the First Yeongnam Gate, remains, standing now in Dalseong Park. The rest of the fortress wall is remembered only through the names of the streets Dongseongno and Bukseongno, "east fortress street" and "north fortress street," which now run where the wall once stood.

== Japanese rule ==
The Korean independence movements were active in Daegu. These began as early as 1898, when a branch of the Independence Club was established in the city. As the demise of the Korean Empire approached in 1907, local citizens led by Seo Sang-don organized the National Debt Repayment Movement. This movement spread nationwide, although it was unsuccessful in its attempt to repay the country's debt through individual donations. Resistance activities continued after the 1910 annexation, notably during the March 1st movement of 1919. At that time, four major demonstrations took place in Daegu, involving an estimated 23,000 people.

The women of Daegu were active in the independence struggle, as they were elsewhere in the country. The Patriotic Women's Educational Society, or aeguk buin gyoyukhoe (애국부인교육회), was based in the city. Women also took a leading role in the National Debt Repayment Movement, including the kisaeng Aengmu.

Many schools and colleges were established in Daegu, both by private organizations and by the Japanese government. These included the government-run Daegu Normal School, later Daegu Teachers' College, which became the Teachers' College of Kyungpook National University after 1945.

== South Korea ==
The end of Japanese rule in 1945 brought years of turbulent change to Daegu. Under the USAMGIK provisional military government and the subsequent First Republic, Daegu was a hotbed of unrest. In October 1946, the Daegu uprising took place, one of the most serious incidents of unrest during US military rule, where police attempts to control rioters on October 1 caused the death of three student demonstrators and injuries to many others, sparking a mass counter-attack killing 38 policemen. It was also the site of major demonstrations on February 28, 1960, prior to the fraudulent presidential election of that year.

Daegu and all of North Gyeongsang saw heavy guerrilla activity in the late 1940s, as thousands of refugees arrived from the fighting in Jeolla. In November 1948, a unit in Daegu joined the mutiny which had begun in Yeosu the previous month.

During the Korean War, much heavy fighting occurred nearby along the Nakdong River. Daegu was inside the Pusan Perimeter, however, and therefore remained in South Korean hands throughout the war. As in many other areas during the Korean War, political killings of dissenters were widespread.

In the second half of the 20th century, the city underwent explosive growth, and the population has increased more than tenfold since the end of the Korean War. The city was heavily politically favored during the long military dictatorship of Park Chung Hee, when it and the surrounding area served as his political base. Conservative political movements remain powerful in Daegu today.

In the 1980s, Daegu became a separately administered provincial-level Directly Governed City (Jikhalsi), and was redesignated as a Metropolitan City (Gwangyeoksi) in 1995.

The 1995 Daegu gas explosions killed 101 people, including middle school students, become one of the worst mass casualty incidents in Korean history.

In 2003, a mentally ill man set fire to a train of the Daegu Metropolitan Subway stopped at Jungangno station. The resulting blaze killed nearly 200 persons, making the Daegu subway fire one of the worst disasters in South Korea since the end of the Korean War.

In 2022, an arsonist killed six people and himself in an office building.

On July 1, 2023, the Gunwi County of the North Gyeongsang Province integrated into Daegu.

Today, Daegu is the 3rd largest metropolitan area in Korea with respect to both population and commerce.

== See also ==
- History of South Korea
- History of Korea
- Daegu

== Notes ==
1. Lee (1984), p. 76 and Shin (1999).
2. Lee (1984) and Shin (1999) both make this assumption.
3. Lee (1984), p. 131.
4. Lee (1984), p. 149.
5. Lee (1984), p. 294.
6. Lee (1984), p. 302.
7. Lee (1984), p. 343.
8. Kim (1976), p. 255
9. Lee (1984), p. 377.
10. Lee (1984), p. 384.
11. Cumings (1997), pp. 243–244.
12. Nahm (1996), p. 379.
