= Socheon-myeon =

- Hangul: 소천면
- Hanja: 小川面
- RR: Socheon-myeon
- MR: Soch'ŏn-myŏn

Socheon-myeon (Korean: 소천면) is a myeon or a township in Bonghwa county of North Gyeongsang province in South Korea. The total area of Socheon-myeon is 264.17 square kilometers, and, as of 2006, the population was 2,519 people. Socheon-myeon is further divided into seven "ri", or small villages.

Socheon-myeon is famous for the production of Chinese dates, daechu, and for the Hongje Temple.

== Administrative divisions ==
- Hyeondong-ri (현동리)
- Goseon-ri (고선리)
- Imgi-ri (임기리)
- Dueum-ri (두음리)
- Seocheon-ri (서천리)
- Namhoeryong-ri (남회룡리)
- Buncheon-ri (분천리)

== Schools ==
- Socheon Elementary School(소천초등학교) in Hyeondong-ri with branch facilities in Buncheon-ri, Imgi-ri, Dueum-ri, and Namhoeryong-ri.
- Socheon Middle School (소천중학교) in Hyeondong-ri.
- Socheon High School (소천고등학교) in Hyeondong-ri.

== Sources ==
- Socheon-myeon Office Homepage
- Tourist Map of Bonghwa county including Socheon-myeon
