= Bongseong-myeon =

- Hangul: 봉성면
- Hanja: 鳳城面
- RR: Bongseong-myeon
- MR: Pongsŏng-myŏn

Bongseong-myeon (Korean: 봉성면) is a myeon or a township in Bonghwa county of North Gyeongsang province in South Korea. The total area of Bongseong-myeon is 66.69 square kilometers, and, as of 2006, the population was 2,583 people. Bongseong-myeon is further divided into seven "ri", or small villages.

== Administrative divisions ==
- Bongseong-ri (봉성리)
- Oesam-ri (외삼리)
- Changpyeng-ri (창평리)
- Dongyang-ri (동양리)
- Geumbong-ri (금봉리)
- Ugok-ri (우곡리)
- Bongyang-ri (봉양리)

== Schools ==
- Bongseong Elementary School(봉성초등학교) in Bongseong-ri.
- Dongyang Elementary School (동양초등학교) in Dongyang-ri.
