= Ocheon-eup =

Ocheon
- Town
- Interactive map of Ocheon
- Country: South Korea
- Province: North Gyeongsang
- City: Pohang
- Non-autonomous District: Nam-gu
- Administrative divisions: 11 beopjeongni, 41 hangjeongni and 495 ban

Area
  - Total: 70.50 km^{2} (27.22 sq mi)

Population (2015.5)
  - Total: 53,225
  - Density: 755.0/km^{2} (1,955/sq mi)
- Website: Ocheon Town

Korean name
- Hangul: 오천읍
- Hanja: 烏川邑
- RR: Ocheon-eup
- MR: Och'ŏn-ŭp

Ocheon-eup (Korean: 오천읍) is a town, or eup in Nam-gu, Pohang, North Gyeongsang Province, South Korea. The township Ocheon-myeon was upgraded to the town Ocheon-eup in 1980. Ocheon Town Office is located in Mundeok-ri.

== Communities ==
Ocheon-eup is divided into 11 villages (ri).

| | Hangul | Hanja |
|---|---|---|
| Won-ri | 원리 | 院里 |
| Mundeok-ri | 문덕리 | 文德里 |
| Hangsa-ri | 항사리 | 恒沙里 |
| Jinjeon-ri | 진전리 | 陳田里 |
| Galpyeong-ri | 갈평리 | 葛坪里 |
| Munchung-ri | 문충리 | 文忠里 |
| Yongsan-ri | 용산리 | 龍山里 |
| Gwangmyeong-ri | 광명리 | 光明里 |
| Segye-ri | 세계리 | 世界里 |
| Yongdeok-ri | 용덕리 | 龍德里 |
| Gujeong-ri | 구정리 | 舊政里 |
