= Murya-myeon =

Town in South Korea

- Hangul: 물야면
- Hanja: 物野面
- RR: Murya-myeon
- MR: Murya-myŏn

Murya-myeon (Korean: 물야면) is a myeon or a township in Bonghwa county of North Gyeongsang province in South Korea. The total area of Murya-myeon is 109.26 km^{2} (42.19 sq mi), and, as of 2006, the population was 3,518 people. Murya-myeon is further divided into eight "ri", or small villages.

== Administrative divisions ==
- Orok-ri (오록리)
- Gapyeong-ri (가평리)
- Gaedan-ri (개단리)
- Ojeon-ri (오전리)
- Apdong-ri (압동리)
- Dumun-ri (두문리)
- Susik-ri (수식리)
- Bukji-ri (북지리)

== Schools ==
- Murya Elementary School(물야초등학교) in Orok-ri with branch facilities in Gaedan-ri, Bukji-ri, and Susik-ri.
- Murya Middle School (물야중학교) in Orok-ri.
