= Beopjeon-myeon =

- Hangul: 법전면
- Hanja: 法田面
- RR: Beopjeon-myeon
- MR: Pŏpchŏn-myŏn

Beopjeon-myeon (Korean: 법전면) is a myeon or a township in Bonghwa county of North Gyeongsang province in South Korea. The total area of Beopjeon-myeon is 70.22 square kilometers, and, as of 2006, the population was 2,368 people. Beopjeon-myeon is further divided into seven "ri", or small villages.

== Administrative divisions ==
- Beopjeon-ri (법전리)
- Pungjeong-ri (풍정리)
- Cheokgok-ri (척곡리)
- Socheon-ri (소천리)
- Nulsan-ri (눌산리)
- Eoji-ri (어지리)
- Soji-ri (소지리)

== Schools ==
- Beopjeon Elementary School(법전중앙초등학교) in Beopjeon-ri.
- Beopjeon Middle School (법전중학교) in Beopjeon-ri.
