= Ancient Tombs in Jisan-dong, Goryeong =

Gaya-era tombs in Goryeong, South Korea

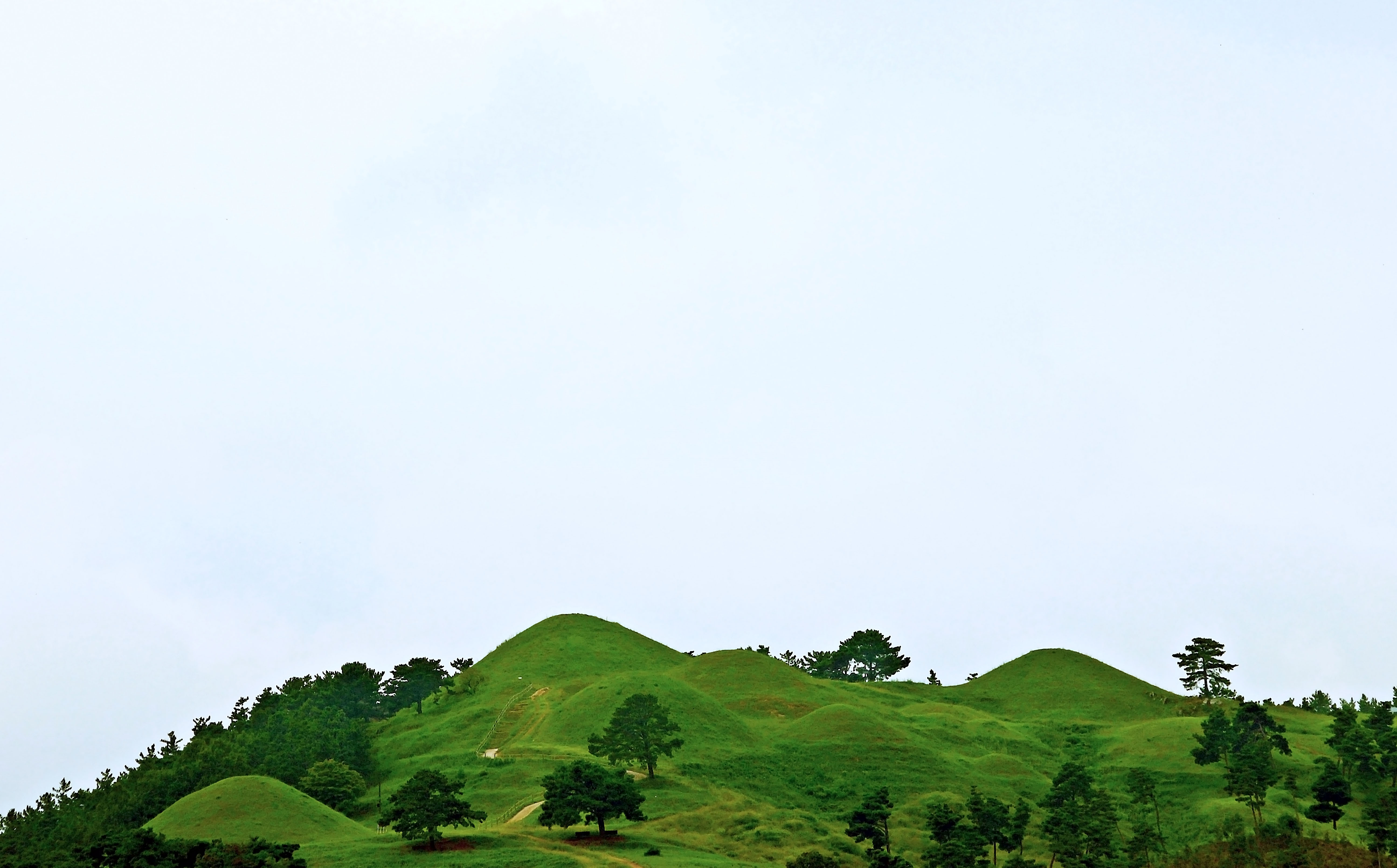
- Some of the tombs (2019)
- Interactive map of Ancient Tombs in Jisan-dong, Goryeong
- Location: Goryeong County, North Gyeongsang Province, South Korea
- Coordinates: 35°43′28″N 128°15′09″E

Historic Sites of South Korea
- Designated: 1963-01-21

The Ancient Tombs in Jisan-dong, Goryeong (Korean: 고령 지산동 고분군; Hanja: 高靈池山洞古墳群) are Gaya confederacy–era tombs in Jisan-dong, Goryeong County, North Gyeongsang Province, South Korea. On January 21, 1963, they were made Historic Sites of South Korea.

There are 22 tumulus tombs in the area that have been discovered. Various classes of people were buried in these tombs, including nobles and servants. Some tombs have multiple people buried in them, which suggests that they are for servants and not more important people. A number of artifacts, including a suit of armor, helmet, and long sword, have been discovered in the tombs.
