= Goa-eup =

Goa
- Town
- Country: South Korea
- Province: North Gyeongsang
- City: Gumi
- Administrative divisions: 18 beopjeongni, 41 hangjeongni and 400 ban

Area
  - Total: 63.82 km^{2} (24.64 sq mi)

Population (2025.7)
  - Total: 40,172
  - Density: 629.5/km^{2} (1,630/sq mi)
- Website: Goa Town

Korean name
- Hangul: 고아읍
- Hanja: 高牙邑
- RR: Goa-eup
- MR: Koa-ŭp

Goa-eup (Korean: 고아읍) is a town, or eup in Gumi, North Gyeongsang Province, South Korea. The township Goa-myeon was upgraded to the town Goa-eup in 1997. Goa Town Office is located in Gwansim-ri, which is crowded with people.

== Communities ==
Goa-eup is divided into 18 villages (ri).

	Hangul	Hanja
Gwansim-ri	관심리	官心里
Irye-ri	이례리	伊禮里
Oro-ri	오로리	吾老里
Daemang-ri	대망리	大望里
Pasan-ri	파산리	巴山里
Sinchon-ri	신촌리	新村里
Hwangsan-ri	황산리	凰山里
Hoengsan-ri	횡산리	橫山里
Oeye-ri	외예리	外乂里
Naeye-ri	내예리	內乂里
Wonho-ri	원호리	元湖里
Munseong-ri	문성리	文星里
Dasik-ri	다식리	多食里
Goepyeong-ri	괴평리	槐平里
Songnim-ri	송림리	松林里
Bonghan-ri	봉한리	鳳漢里
Hanggok-ri	항곡리	項谷里
Yegang-ri	예강리	禮江里
