= Daegaya-eup =

Daegaya
- Town
- Panoramic view of Daegaya-eup
- Interactive map of Daegaya
- Country: South Korea
- Province: North Gyeongsang
- County: Goryeong County
- Administrative divisions: 13 beopjeongni, 25 hangjeongni and 161 ban

Area
  - Total: 47.37 km^{2} (18.29 sq mi)

Population (2015)
  - Total: 11,111
  - Density: 234.6/km^{2} (607.5/sq mi)
- Website: Daegaya Town

Korean name
- Hangul: 대가야읍
- Hanja: 大加耶邑
- RR: Daegaya-eup
- MR: Taegaya-ŭp

Daegaya-eup (Korean: 대가야읍) is a town, or eup in Goryeong County, North Gyeongsang Province, South Korea. The township Goryeong-myeon was upgraded to the town Goryeong-eup in 1979, and it was renamed Daegaya-eup in 2015. Goryeong County Office is located in Jisan-ri, and Daegaya Town Office is in Kwaebin-ri which is crowded with people.

== Communities ==
Daegaya-eup is divided into 13 villages (ri).

	Hangul	Hanja
Kwaebin-ri	쾌빈리	快賓里
Goa-ri	고아리	古衙里
Heonmun-ri	헌문리	軒門里
Janggi-ri	장기리	場基里
Yeonjo-ri	연조리	延詔里
Jisan-ri	지산리	池山里
Bongwan-ri	본관리	本館里
Junghwa-ri	중화리	中化里
Jeojeon-ri	저전리	楮田里
Naesang-ri	내상리	內上里
Sin-ri	신리	新里
Oe-ri	외리	外里
Naegok-ri	내곡리	內谷里
