= Hwawon-eup =

Hwawon
- Town
- Coordinates: 35°47′01″N 128°30′39″E
- Country: South Korea
- Province: Daegu
- County: Dalseong County
- Administrative divisions: 6 beopjeongni, 46 hangjeongni and 498 ban

Area
  - Total: 27.68 km^{2} (10.69 sq mi)

Population (2012.12)
  - Total: 55,603
  - Density: 2,009/km^{2} (5,203/sq mi)
- Website: Hwawon Town

Korean name
- Hangul: 화원읍
- Hanja: 花園邑
- RR: Hwawon-eup
- MR: Hwawŏn-ŭp

Hwawon (Korean: 화원읍) is a town, or eup in Dalseong County, Daegu, South Korea. The township Hwawon-myeon was upgraded to the town Hwawon-eup in 1992. Hwawon Town Office is located in the densely populated Cheonnae-ri.

== Communities ==
Hwawon-eup is divided into 6 villages (ri).

	Hangul	Hanja
Cheonnae-ri	천내리	川內里
Gura-ri	구라리	九羅里
Seongsan-ri	성산리	城山里
Seolhwa-ri	설화리	舌化里
Myeonggok-ri	명곡리	椧谷里
Bolli-ri	본리리	本里里
