= Goryeong County =

Coordinates: 35°43′49″N 128°16′08″E

Goryeong
- County
- Flag Emblem of Goryeong

- Location in South Korea
- Country: South Korea
- Region: Yeongnam
- Administrative divisions: 1 eup, 7 myeon

Area
  - Total: 383.7 km^{2} (148.1 sq mi)

Population (September 2024)
  - Total: 30,200
  - Density: 91.2/km^{2} (236/sq mi)
  - Dialect: Gyeongsang

Korean name
- Hangul: 고령군
- Hanja: 高靈郡
- RR: Goryeong-gun
- MR: Koryŏng-gun

Goryeong County (Korean: 고령군) is a county in North Gyeongsang Province, South Korea.

Goryeong is a historical center of the ancient kingdom of Daegaya.

== Administrative divisions ==
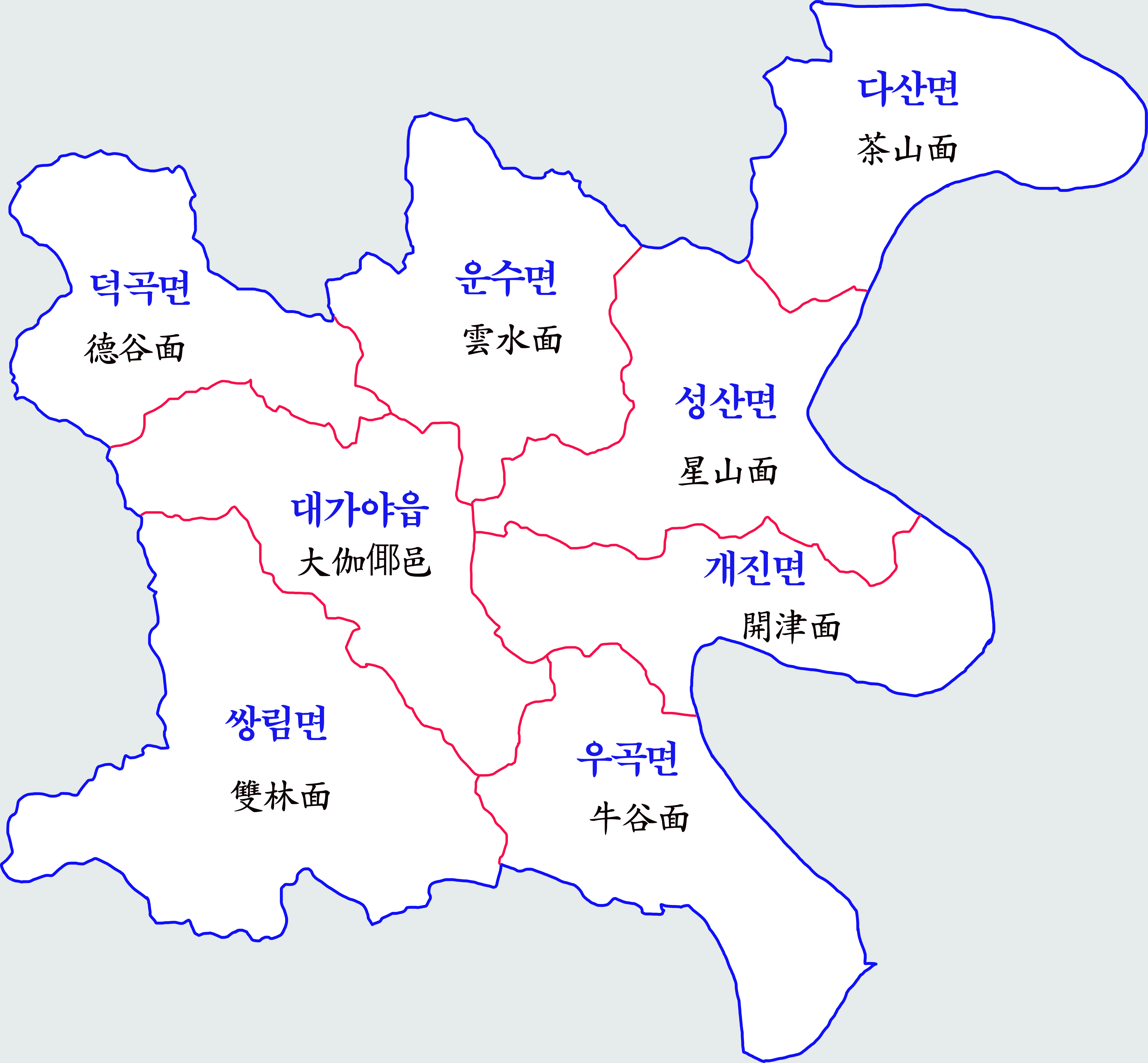
Map of Goryeong County in Korean

Goryeong County is divided into 1 eup and 7 myeon.

Name	Hangeul	Hanja
Daegaya-eup	대가야읍	大伽倻邑
Deokgok-myeon	덕곡면	德谷面
Unsu-myeon	운수면	雲水面
Seongsan-myeon	성산면	星山面
Dasan-myeon	다산면	茶山面
Gaejin-myeon	개진면	開津面
Ugok-myeon	우곡면	牛谷面
Ssangnim-myeon	쌍림면	雙林面

== Geography ==
Goryeong-gun is mountainous, with a rugged mountain range to the southwest and the main stream of the Nakdong river flowing to the east, which forms the border with Dalseong-gun. Many rivers originating from Gayasan, such as Geumcheon (금천; 錦川) and Hoecheon (회천; 會川), join in Goryeong before flowing into the Nakdong river. On the western bank of Nakdong river lies fertile alluvial plains suitable for agriculture.

The area is rich in kaolinite which boosted Goryeong's ceramic industry since ancient times, and it is associated with porcelain pottery. Traditional roof tiles are also produced, as with inkstones boasting colors such as purple, green, and black.

== Agriculture ==
The total cultivated area of Goryeong-gun is 6,503 hectares or 16.9%, of which rice paddies account for 4,993 hectares or about 77%, and dry fields account for 1,510 hectares or about 23%. Agriculture in the region thrived thanks to the abundant water supply from the Nakdong river. Besides rice, fruits like strawberries, melons, cantaloupes are also produced in large volumes. Local strawberries has been exported overseas to places such as Hong Kong, Taiwan, and Japan since 1992. Goryeong's strawberry farms have also doubled as agri-tourism destinations.

== Tourism ==
Being the historic center of Daegaya, Goryeong-gun's tourist attractions revolves around the ancient state. Some of them include:

- Daegaya Museum
- Ureuk Museum
- Daegaya Historical Theme Tourist Site
- Daegaya Living Village
- Daegaya Royal Tomb Exhibition Hall
- Goryeong Jisan-dong Ancient Tombs
- Daegaya Jongmyo Shrine
- Banryongsa Temple (built during the Silla era)

Every March, Goryeong-gun holds the Daegaya Festival, a festival celebrating the history of the county filled with activities such as ceremonies, traditional performances, and concerts.

Besides history-themed attractions, it also boasts villages that offer scenic views of nature, hence the orientation of development towards driving eco-tourism in the region.

== Twin towns – sister cities ==
Goryeong is twinned with:

- Hampyeong, South Korea
- Seocho-gu, South Korea

== See also ==
- Dasan-myeon
- Gaya confederacy
