= Bonghwa-eup =

Bonghwa
- Town
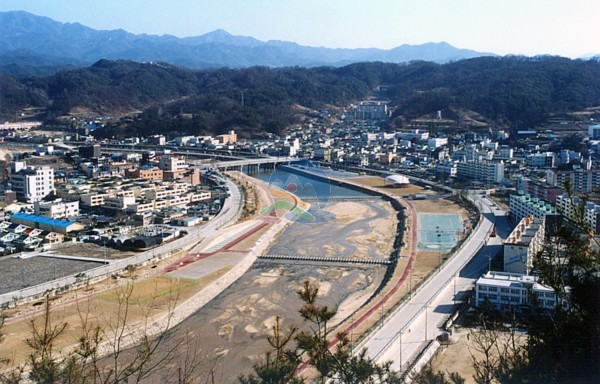
- Bonghwa on the river Naeseongcheon

- Location within South Korea
- Country: South Korea
- Province: North Gyeongsang
- County: Bonghwa County
- Administrative divisions: 10 beopjeongni, 25 hangjeongni and 171 ban

Area
  - Total: 74.27 km^{2} (28.68 sq mi)

Population (2013.12)
  - Total: 10,736
  - Density: 144.6/km^{2} (374.4/sq mi)
- Website: Bonghwa Town

Korean name
- Hangul: 봉화읍
- Hanja: 奉化邑
- RR: Bonghwa-eup
- MR: Ponghwa-ŭp

Bonghwa-eup (Korean: 봉화읍) is a town, or eup in Bonghwa County, North Gyeongsang Province, South Korea. The township Bonghwa-myeon was upgraded to the town Bonghwa-eup in 1979. Bonghwa County Office and Bonghwa Town Office are located in Naeseong-ri, which is crowded with people.

== Communities ==
Bonghwa-eup is divided into 10 villages (ri).

	Hangul	Hanja
Naeseong-ri	내성리	乃城里
Samgye-ri	삼계리	三溪里
Yugok-ri	유곡리	酉谷里
Geochon-ri	거촌리	巨村里
Seokpyeong-ri	석평리	石坪里
Haejeo-ri	해저리	海底里
Jeokdeok-ri	적덕리	赤德里
Hwacheon-ri	화천리	花川里
Dochon-ri	도촌리	都村里
Mundan-ri	문단리	文丹里
