= Old Partner =

- Directed by: Lee Chung-ryoul
- Written by: Lee Chung-ryoul
- Produced by: Goh Young-jae
- Starring: Choi Won-gyun; Lee Sam-sun; Kim Min-ja; Choi So-du; Choi Jong-man
- Cinematography: Ji Jae-woo
- Edited by: Lee Chung-ryoul
- Music by: Heo Hoon; Min So-yun
- Production company: Studio Neurimbo
- Distributed by: IndieStory
- Release dates: October 4, 2008 (Pusan International Film Festival); January 15, 2009 (South Korea)
- Running time: 78 minutes
- Country: South Korea
- Language: Korean

Old Partner (Korean: 워낭 소리; RR: Wonang sori; lit. 'Cowbell Sound') is a 2008 South Korean documentary film directed by Lee Chung-ryoul. Set in the small rural town of Hanul-ri in Sangun-myeon, Bonghwa County, North Gyeongsang Province, the film focuses on the relationship between a 40-year-old cow and an old farmer in his 80s.

The film was a surprise success. It attracted over 2.93 million viewers, setting the record for the highest grossing independent film in Korean film history. It won the PIFF Mecenat Award at the Pusan International Film Festival and the Audience Award at the Korean Independent Film Awards. Lee Chung-ryoul became the first independent film director to receive the Best New Director award at the Baeksang Arts Awards.

== Awards and nominations ==
- Won the PIFF Mecenat Award at the 2008 Pusan International Film Festival
- Won the Audience Award at the 2008 Seoul Independent Film Festival
- Nominated for the World Cinema Documentary at the 2009 Sundance Film Festival
- Won the Audience Award at the Korean Independent Film Awards
- Won Best New Director at the 2009 Baeksang Arts Awards
- Won Best International Documentary at the 2009 Italian Environmental Film Festival
