= Seokjeok =

Place in South Korea

- Hangul: 석적읍
- Hanja: 石積邑
- RR: Seokjeok-eup
- MR: Sŏkchŏk-ŭp

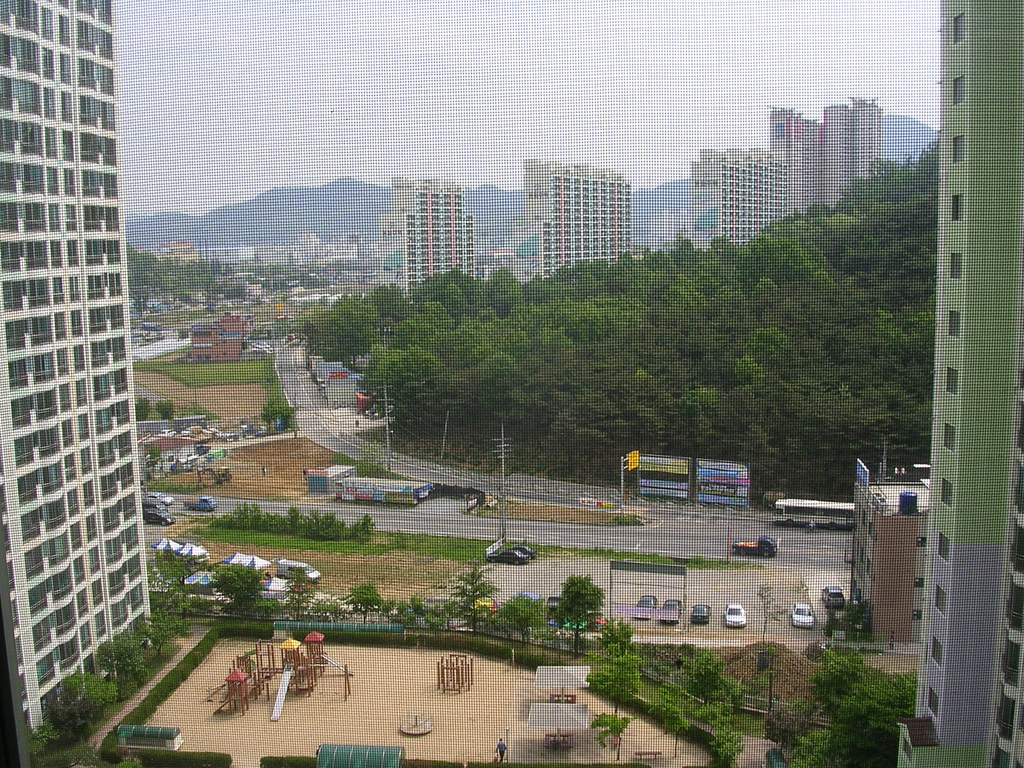
View of Seokjeok facing roughly north toward the expressway.

Seokjeok-eup (Korean: 석적읍) is a town (eup in Korean) in South Korea on the Nakdong River. It is part of Chilgok and is situated roughly midway between the cities of Gumi and Waegwan. Many residents work at the small, mostly owner-operated local shops. However, the vast majority of the population works in either Gumi and Waegwan, and the village itself serves primarily as a bedroom community.

== Uprising in Seokjeok (1948) ==
On February 2, 1948, a revolt took place that was triggered by the lack of welfare and support the government gave to keep Seokjeok a prosperous and well funded town (considering that Seokjeok was not a very wealthy town). The uprising later reached a point in which the Republic of Korea's Army and Air Force had to take action. The engagement resulted in fifty-two civilian deaths and fourteen soldiers. Many were injured. The revolt officially ended on February 10, 1948, when the South Korea government agreed to profit Seokjeok (in which it later was temporarily discontinued due to the start of the Korean War).

== Dissemination of local information ==
The village is equipped with a public address system, used to provide critical information regarding military service or the Korean analogue to Amber alerts, among other relevant information.

== Cultural norms ==
Seokjeok is a clean city. It is uncommon to find cigarette butts or spent chewing gum in the streets. High-rise apartment complexes dominate the landscape. In these large complexes, there is a cultural analogue to freecycling, whereby disused or no longer needed items such as furniture, small appliances, and window dressings are not discarded, but put either on the street or in enclosures reserved for that purpose. Perfectly serviceable items can be obtained for free simply by picking them up from the street. Specialized bins are reserved for general trash, food garbage, and recycling, and any attempt to place an item in an inappropriate bin will be met with a correction from a citizen or security officer.

== Shopping and eating ==
The village of Seokjeok is peppered with HOF (beer) bars, takeout shops, and a few traditional restaurants. In addition, bakeries often sell sandwiches and sweet baps filled with custard for a light snack. Woobang terminal can be accessed using the 10 bus service, and a short walk to Woobang Station provides access to Daegu, approximately 15 minutes away. Gumi can be accessed using the 55 or 555 service in the opposite direction. Very large retail stores such as Lotte Mart and E-Mall can be found on the bus line in Gumi.
