= Jillyang =

- Town
- Country: South Korea
- Province: North Gyeongsang
- City: Gyeongsan
- Administrative divisions: 25 beopjeongni, 52 hangjeongni and 388 ban

Area
  - Total: 46.17 km^{2} (17.83 sq mi)

Population (2015.5)
  - Total: 41,107
  - Density: 890.3/km^{2} (2,306/sq mi)
- Website: Jillyang Town

Korean name
- Hangul: 진량읍
- Hanja: 珍良邑
- RR: Jillyang-eup
- MR: Chillyang-ŭp

Jillyang (Korean: 진량읍) is a town, or eup in Gyeongsan, North Gyeongsang Province, South Korea. The township Jillyang-myeon was upgraded to the town Jillyang-eup in 1997. Jillyang Town Office is located in Sinsang-ri, which is crowded with people.

== Communities ==
Jillyang-eup is divided into 25 villages (ri).

	Hangul	Hanja
Sinsang-ri	신상리	新上里
Seonhwa-ri	선화리	仙花里
Boin-ri	보인리	甫仁里
Bonghoe-ri	봉회리	鳳會里
Buk-ri	북리	北里
Bugi-ri	부기리	富基里
Yanggi-ri	양기리	良基里
Sangnim-ri	상림리	上林里
Naeri-ri	내리리	內里里
Muncheon-ri	문천리	文川里
Pyeongsa-ri (坪)	평(坪)사리	坪沙里
Pyeongsa-ri (平)	평(平)사리	平沙里
Damun-ri	다문리	多文里
Asa-ri	아사리	阿沙里
Simun-ri	시문리	柴門里
Hyeonnae-ri	현내리	縣內里
Magok-ri	마곡리	麻谷里
Gwangseok-ri	광석리	廣石里
Sinje-ri	신제리	新堤里
Daewon-ri	대원리	大院里
Sokcho-ri	속초리	束草里
Anchon-ri	안촌리	雁村里
Hwangje-ri	황제리	凰堤里
Danggok-ri	당곡리	堂谷里
Gaya-ri	가야리	佳野里
