= Dalseong County =

Coordinates: 35°46′N 128°26′E

Dalseong
- County
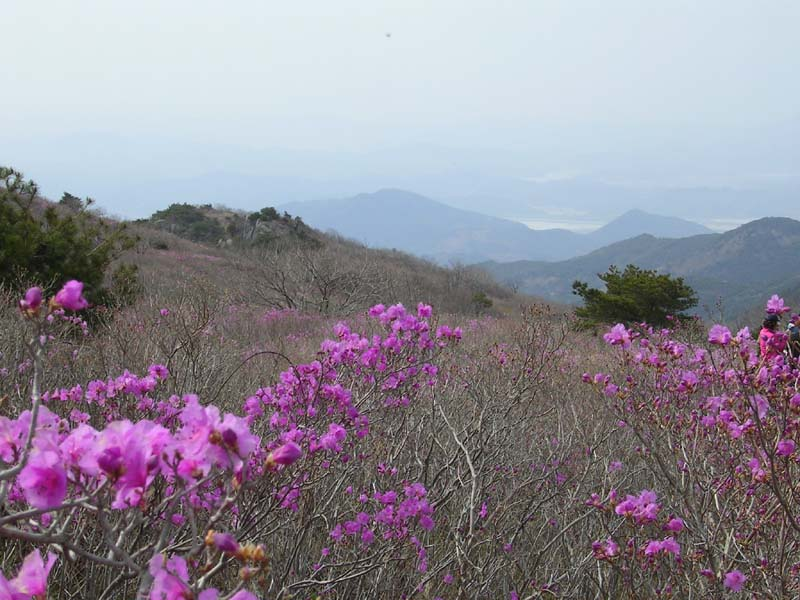

- Flag

- Country: South Korea
- Region: Yeongnam
- Provincial level: Daegu

Area
  - Total: 426.86 km^{2} (164.81 sq mi)

Population (2021)
  - Total: 267,473
  - Density: 626.61/km^{2} (1,622.9/sq mi)
  - Dialect: Gyeongsang
- Website: Dalseong County Office

Korean name
- Hangul: 달성군
- Hanja: 達城郡
- RR: Dalseong-gun
- MR: Talsŏng-gun

Dalseong County (Korean: 달성군) is a gun occupying much of south and western Daegu, South Korea. A largely rural district lying along the Nakdong River, it makes up nearly half of Daegu's total area. It is divided in half by a narrow piece of Dalseo District that reaches west to the river.

Like the other local government units in South Korea, Dalseong-gun enjoys a moderate degree of local autonomy. The county magistrate and council are elected by the local citizens, although their authority is sharply curtailed. The seat of government is located in Nongong-eup. The current magistrate is Lee Jong-jin.

Dalseong-gun enters historical records in 757, as Daegu-hyeon, a subsidiary of Suchang-gun (modern-day Suseong-gu). Dalseong-gun became part of Daegu Metropolitan City in 1995, as part of a general reform of local governments.

As the near hinterland of Daegu, Dalseong-gun is known as a center of truck farming and tourism. Landmarks of Dalseong-gun include Biseulsan and the Naengcheon resort area beneath Paljoryeong.

The name Dalseong means "Dal Castle," and comes from the earlier name of Daegu, Dalgubeol.

== Administrative divisions ==
Administrative divisions

Dalseong-gun is divided into six eup and three myeon. These are in turn divided into 279 ri and 1470 ban.

- Dasa-eup
- Hyeonpung-eup
- Hwawon-eup
- Nongong-eup
- Okpo-eup
- Yuga-eup
- Gachang-myeon
- Guji-myeon
- Habin-myeon

== Company ==
- HD Hyundai Robotics

== See also ==
- Geography of South Korea
