= Uljin County =

Coordinates: 37°00′N 129°24′E

Uljin
- County
- Panoramic view of Uljin-eup

- Flag Emblem of Uljin

- Location in South Korea
- Country: South Korea
- Region: Yeongnam; Gwandong (before 1963)
- Administrative divisions: 2 eup, 8 myeon

Government
  - Type: Uljin County
  - Mayor: Im Kwang-Won

Area
  - Total: 989.06 km^{2} (381.88 sq mi)

Population (September 2024)
  - Total: 46,112
  - Density: 61.7/km^{2} (160/sq mi)
  - Dialect: Gyeongsang Gangwon

Korean name
- Hangul: 울진군
- Hanja: 蔚珍郡
- RR: Uljin-gun
- MR: Ulchin-gun

Uljin County (Korean: 울진군) is a county in North Gyeongsang Province, South Korea. Before 1963, Uljin was in Gangwon Province.

It borders the Sea of Japan in the east, Bonghwa-gun and Yeongyang-gun in the west, Yeongdeok-gun in the south, and Samcheok-si, Gangwon-do in the north. It is located at 129°04'-129°29' east longitude and 36°38'-37°06' north latitude. The area is 989.43 square kilometers, and the population is 51,885 (as of 2015). There are 2 eups, 8 myeons, and 195 administrative districts (79 Beopjeong-ri). The county office is located in Eupnae-ri, Uljin-eup, Uljin-gun, Gyeongsangbuk-do.

== Administrative divisions ==
Map of Uljin County. Note that Seo-myeon has been renamed to Geumgangsong-myeon on 21 April 2015.

Uljin County is divided into 2 eup and 8 myeon.

Name	Hangeul	Hanja
Uljin-eup	울진읍	蔚珍邑
Pyeonghae-eup	평해읍	平海邑
Buk-myeon	북면	北面
Geumgangsong-myeon	금강송면	金剛松面
Geunnam-myeon	근남면	近南面
Maehwa-myeon	매화면	梅花面
Giseong-myeon	기성면	箕城面
Onjeong-myeon	온정면	溫井面
Jukbyeon-myeon	죽변면	竹邊面
Hupo-myeon	후포면	厚浦面

== Culture and sightseeing ==
=== Festivals ===
Uljin's festivals reflect the county's agricultural and maritime industry.

In 2005 and 2009 for three weeks, Uljin hosted the Uljin Organic Food Exhibition (울진세계친환경농업엑스포) in Uljin's Expo Park. The expo features global representatives of the organic food industry, interactive activities, live music, and food. The next expo is slated for July 2013.

- Uljin Snow Crab Promotion Exhibition Center

=== Museums ===
- Freshwater Fish Museum
- Hupo-ri Neolithic Historic Museum
- Wonjaryeok Museum
- Hyangam Museum of Art
- Bongpyeong Silla Stele in Uljin

=== Parks ===
- Gusugok Recreational Forest
- Nagok ocean fishing park
- Expo Park
- Tonggosan Recreational Forest
- Geumgang Pine Forest of Uljin

=== Villages ===
- Giseong-ri Fishing and Recreation Village
- Nagok-ri Fishing and Recreation Village
- Ssangjeolli Green Village
- Wangpi Georigo Village

=== Experiences ===
- Geoil-ri Fishing Village Experiences
- Deokgu Spa
- Sung Ryu Park Hot Spring
- Uljin Science Experience
- 'Into The Storm' Drama Set
- Baegam Hot Springs Special Tourist Zone
- Geumgangsong Ecorium
- Uljin Guemgangsong Culture Center
- Hanhwa Condominium
- Camphorse
- Ul-Jin Yacht School
- Ul-jin Ocean Leports Center

=== Other important spots ===
- Seongnyugul Cave
- Sinsun Valley

== Architecture ==
=== Historical ===
- Buryeongsa Temple
- Mangyangjeong Pavilion
- Wolsongjeong Pavilion

=== Modern ===
- Deunggisan Suspension Bridge

== Economy ==
The Uljin Nuclear Power Plant, one of four nuclear power plants in South Korea, is located in Bugu. The plant currently has six reactors and is a top source of jobs for the county and region.

== Education ==
=== High schools ===
- Hupo High School
- Jukbyeon High School
- Pyeonghae Gongeob High School
- Pyeonghae Jeongbo High School
- Uljin High School

=== Middle schools ===
- Bugu Middle School
- Giseong Middle School
- Hupo Middle School
- Jukbyeon Middle School
- Maewha Middle School
- Onjeong Middle School
- Pyeonghae Middle School
- Pyeonghae Girl's Middle School
- Uljin Middle School

=== Elementary schools ===
- Bugu Elementary School
- Giseong Elementary School
- Hupo Elementary School
- Hupo Dongbu Elementary School
- Jukbyeon Elementary School
- Maewha Elementary School
- Noeum Elementary School
- Onjeong Elementary School
- Pyeonghae Elementary School
- Uljin Elementary School
- Uljin Nambu Elementary School
- Sadong Elementary School
- Samgeun Elementary School
- Wolsong Elementary School

== Climate ==
Uljin has a cooler version of a humid subtropical climate (Köppen: Cfa).

Climate data for Uljin (1991–2020 normals, extremes 1971–present)
Month	Jan	Feb	Mar	Apr	May	Jun	Jul	Aug	Sep	Oct	Nov	Dec	Year
Record high °C (°F)	17.4 (63.3)	24.0 (75.2)	27.7 (81.9)	33.7 (92.7)	35.6 (96.1)	36.0 (96.8)	38.6 (101.5)	37.8 (100.0)	35.4 (95.7)	29.7 (85.5)	28.5 (83.3)	21.4 (70.5)	37.8 (100.0)
Mean daily maximum °C (°F)	6.5 (43.7)	7.9 (46.2)	11.8 (53.2)	17.2 (63.0)	21.1 (70.0)	23.3 (73.9)	26.8 (80.2)	27.5 (81.5)	24.1 (75.4)	20.1 (68.2)	14.5 (58.1)	8.9 (48.0)	17.5 (63.5)
Daily mean °C (°F)	1.4 (34.5)	3.0 (37.4)	6.9 (44.4)	12.1 (53.8)	16.3 (61.3)	19.4 (66.9)	23.1 (73.6)	23.9 (75.0)	20.0 (68.0)	15.1 (59.2)	9.3 (48.7)	3.6 (38.5)	12.8 (55.0)
Mean daily minimum °C (°F)	−2.9 (26.8)	−1.6 (29.1)	2.1 (35.8)	7.1 (44.8)	11.8 (53.2)	16.0 (60.8)	20.3 (68.5)	21.1 (70.0)	16.3 (61.3)	10.4 (50.7)	4.4 (39.9)	−1.0 (30.2)	8.7 (47.7)
Record low °C (°F)	−16.1 (3.0)	−14.1 (6.6)	−10.2 (13.6)	−3.0 (26.6)	2.8 (37.0)	6.5 (43.7)	11.9 (53.4)	11.3 (52.3)	7.3 (45.1)	−0.8 (30.6)	−6.5 (20.3)	−13.8 (7.2)	−16.1 (3.0)
Average precipitation mm (inches)	48.9 (1.93)	36.9 (1.45)	56.0 (2.20)	76.4 (3.01)	70.5 (2.78)	104.3 (4.11)	203.0 (7.99)	213.0 (8.39)	181.2 (7.13)	97.3 (3.83)	61.0 (2.40)	33.2 (1.31)	1,181.7 (46.52)
Average precipitation days (≥ 0.1 mm)	5.6	5.9	8.2	7.8	8.0	9.4	13.9	13.9	11.6	6.7	6.7	4.5	102.2
Average snowy days	3.3	3.3	2.7	0.1	0.0	0.0	0.0	0.0	0.0	0.0	0.3	1.6	11.3
Average relative humidity (%)	50.2	54.6	60.0	62.7	70.5	80.4	83.6	84.0	80.4	69.7	60.1	50.1	67.2
Mean monthly sunshine hours	200.8	189.4	209.6	223.9	232.5	196.9	166.6	175.8	171.4	198.8	183.6	201.6	2,350.9
Percentage possible sunshine	65.9	61.1	55.5	58.1	53.8	44.2	36.5	44.0	46.9	58.4	61.4	68.0	53.3
Source: Korea Meteorological Administration (snow and percent sunshine 1981–2010)

== Sister cities ==
- Goyang, South Korea
- Yangcheon-gu, South Korea
- Seocho-gu, South Korea
- Suseong-gu, South Korea
- Dong-gu, Busan, South Korea
- Omaezaki, Shizuoka Prefecture, Japan
