= Bonghwa County =

Coordinates: 36°53′26″N 128°44′11″E

Bonghwa
- County
- Flag Emblem of Bonghwa

- Location in South Korea
- Country: South Korea
- Region: Yeongnam
- Administrative divisions: 1 eup, 9 myeon

Area
  - Total: 1,201 km^{2} (464 sq mi)

Population (September 2024)
  - Total: 29,082
  - Density: 34.5/km^{2} (89/sq mi)
  - Dialect: Gyeongsang

Korean name
- Hangul: 봉화군
- Hanja: 奉化郡
- RR: Bonghwa-gun
- MR: Ponghwa-gun

Bonghwa County (Korean: 봉화군) is a county in North Gyeongsang Province, South Korea. It lies inland, at the northern edge of the province, and borders Gangwon province to the north. To the east it is bounded by Yeongyang and Uljin counties, to the south by Andong, and to the west by Yeongju. The county is ringed by the Taebaek and Sobaek Mountains, the highest of which is Taebaeksan (1,566.7m). Because of its mountainous location, Bonghwa has a colder climate than most of the province, with an average annual temperature of 10 °C (50 °F).

Bonghwa is connected to the national rail grid by the Yeongdong Line, which stops at Bonghwa station on its way between Yeongju and Gangneung. The Yeongdong Line, which is not known for its speed, stops at a total of 13 stations as it winds through Bonghwa, before ambling north into the next province.

Korean National Treasure No. 201, a rock-carved seated Buddhist statue, is located in Bukji-ri, Murya-myeon.

Famous people from Bonghwa include director Kim Ki-duk. The county is also the setting of the 2008 documentary film Old Partner, which has won numerous awards for its portrayal of rural life.

== Administrative divisions ==
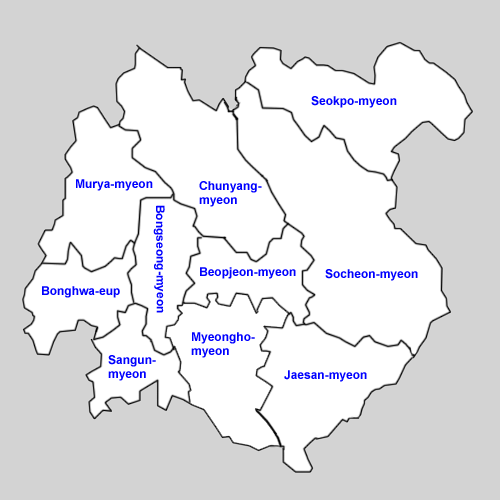
Administrative divisions of Bonghwa-gun

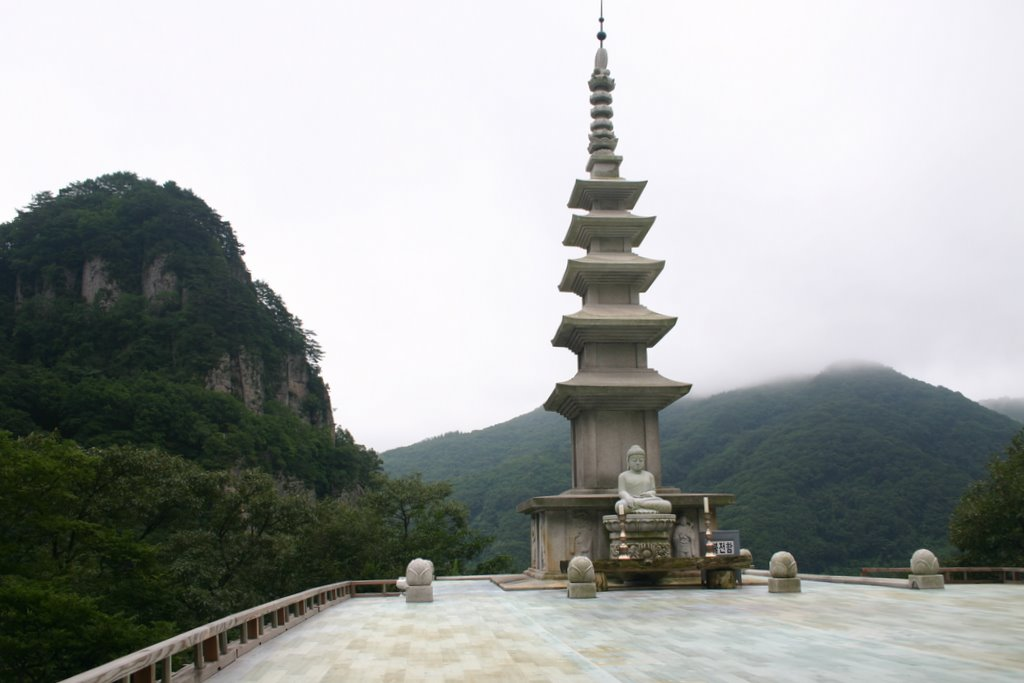
Cheongnyang Temple in Myeongho-myeon.

Bonghwa is divided into ten primary divisions: one eup (large village) and nine rural districts (myeon).

Name	Hangeul	Hanja
Bonghwa-eup	봉화읍	奉化邑
Beopjeon-myeon	법전면	法田面
Bongseong-myeon	봉성면	鳳城面
Chunyang-myeon	춘양면	春陽面
Jaesan-myeon	재산면	才山面
Murya-myeon	물야면	物野面
Myeongho-myeon	명호면	明湖面
Sangun-myeon	상운면	祥雲面
Seokpo-myeon	석포면	石浦面
Socheon-myeon	소천면	小川面

The eup and myeon are further divided into numerous small villages (ri).

eup/myeon	ri	Hangeul
Bonghwa-eup	Samgye-ri	삼계리
Bonghwa-eup	Yugok-ri	유곡리
Bonghwa-eup	Geochon-ri	거촌리
Bonghwa-eup	Seokpyeong-ri	석평리
Bonghwa-eup	Haejeo-ri	해저리
Bonghwa-eup	Jeokdeok-ri	적덕리
Bonghwa-eup	Hwacheon-ri	화천리
Bonghwa-eup	Dochon-ri	도촌리
Bonghwa-eup	Mundan-ri	문단리
Bonghwa-eup	Naeseong-ri	내성리
Beopjeon-myeon	Beopjeon-ri	법전리
Beopjeon-myeon	Pongjeong-ri	풍정리
Beopjeon-myeon	Cheokgok-ri	척곡리
Beopjeon-myeon	Socheon-ri	소천리
Beopjeon-myeon	Nulsan-ri	눌산리
Beopjeon-myeon	Eoji-ri	어지리
Beopjeon-myeon	Soji-ri	소지리
Bongseong-myeon	Bongseong-ri	봉성리
Bongseong-myeon	Oesam-ri	외삼리
Bongseong-myeon	Changpyeong-ri	창평리
Bongseong-myeon	Dongyang-ri	동양리
Bongseong-myeon	Geumbong-ri	금봉리
Bongseong-myeon	Ugok-ri	우곡리
Bongseong-myeon	Bongyang-ri	봉양리
Chunyang-myeon	Uiyang-ri	의양리
Chunyang-myeon	Haksan-ri	학산리
Chunyang-myeon	Seodong-ri	서동리
Chunyang-myeon	Seokhyeon-ri	석현리
Chunyang-myeon	Aedang-ri	애당리
Chunyang-myeon	Dosim-ri	도심리
Chunyang-myeon	Seobyeok-ri	서벽리
Chunyang-myeon	Uguchi-ri	우구치리
Chunyang-myeon	Soro-ri	소로리
Jaesan-myeon	Hyeondong-ri	현동리
Jaesan-myeon	Nammyeon-ri	남면리
Jaesan-myeon	Dongmyeon-ri	동면리
Jaesan-myeon	Galsan-ri	갈산리
Jaesan-myeon	Sang-ri	상리
Murya-myeon	Orok-ri	오록리
Murya-myeon	Gapyeong-ri	가평리
Murya-myeon	Gaedan-ri	개단리
Murya-myeon	Ujan-ri	오전리
Murya-myeon	Apdong-ri	압동리
Murya-myeon	Dumun-ri	두문리
Murya-myeon	Susik-ri	수식리
Murya-myeon	Bukji-ri	북지리
Myeongho-myeon	Docheon-ri	도천리
Myeongho-myeon	Samdong-ri	삼동리
Myeongho-myeon	Yangguk-ri	양곡
Myeongho-myeon	Gogam-ri	고감리
Myeongho-myeon	Pungho-ri	풍호리
Myeongho-myeon	Gogye-ri	고계리
Myeongho-myeon	Bokgok-ri	북곡리
Myeongho-myeon	Gwanchang-ri	관창리
Sangun-myeon	Gagok-ri	가곡리
Sangun-myeon	Ungye-ri	운계리
Sangun-myeon	Munchon-ri	문촌리
Sangun-myeon	Hanul-ri	하눌리
Sangun-myeon	Toil-ri	토일리
Sangun-myeon	Gocheon-ri	구천리
Sangun-myeon	Seolmae-ri	설매리
Sangun-myeon	Sinra-ri	신라리
Seokpo-myeon	Seokpo-ri	석포리
Seokpo-myeon	Daehyeon-ri	대현리
Seokpo-myeon	Seungbu-ri	승부리
Socheon-myeon	Hyeondong-ri	현동리
Socheon-myeon	Goseon-ri	고선리
Socheon-myeon	Imgi-ri	임기리
Socheon-myeon	Dueum-ri	두음리
Socheon-myeon	Seocheon-ri	서천리
Socheon-myeon	Namhoeryong-ri	남회룡리
Socheon-myeon	Buncheon-ri	분천리

== Climate ==
Bonghwa has a monsoon-influenced humid continental climate (Köppen: Dwa) with cold, dry winters and hot, rainy summers.

Climate data for Bonghwa (1991–2020 normals, extremes 1988–present)
Month	Jan	Feb	Mar	Apr	May	Jun	Jul	Aug	Sep	Oct	Nov	Dec	Year
Record high °C (°F)	13.2 (55.8)	19.5 (67.1)	25.2 (77.4)	31.2 (88.2)	33.0 (91.4)	34.6 (94.3)	36.6 (97.9)	37.8 (100.0)	33.8 (92.8)	27.8 (82.0)	24.4 (75.9)	16.2 (61.2)	37.8 (100.0)
Mean daily maximum °C (°F)	3.0 (37.4)	5.9 (42.6)	11.2 (52.2)	18.1 (64.6)	23.3 (73.9)	26.6 (79.9)	28.0 (82.4)	28.6 (83.5)	24.5 (76.1)	19.5 (67.1)	12.1 (53.8)	5.1 (41.2)	17.2 (63.0)
Daily mean °C (°F)	−4.0 (24.8)	−1.6 (29.1)	3.7 (38.7)	9.9 (49.8)	15.5 (59.9)	19.6 (67.3)	22.8 (73.0)	22.9 (73.2)	17.8 (64.0)	11.1 (52.0)	4.2 (39.6)	−2.1 (28.2)	10.0 (50.0)
Mean daily minimum °C (°F)	−10.6 (12.9)	−8.4 (16.9)	−3.2 (26.2)	1.9 (35.4)	7.7 (45.9)	13.4 (56.1)	18.5 (65.3)	18.5 (65.3)	12.4 (54.3)	4.4 (39.9)	−2.2 (28.0)	−8.3 (17.1)	3.7 (38.7)
Record low °C (°F)	−25.0 (−13.0)	−27.7 (−17.9)	−16.2 (2.8)	−9.1 (15.6)	−1.0 (30.2)	1.2 (34.2)	8.2 (46.8)	7.5 (45.5)	1.9 (35.4)	−7.3 (18.9)	−14.6 (5.7)	−21.4 (−6.5)	−27.7 (−17.9)
Average precipitation mm (inches)	16.5 (0.65)	25.9 (1.02)	46.6 (1.83)	80.7 (3.18)	101.5 (4.00)	143.2 (5.64)	277.7 (10.93)	246.8 (9.72)	135.1 (5.32)	48.1 (1.89)	33.2 (1.31)	20.3 (0.80)	1,175.6 (46.28)
Average precipitation days (≥ 0.1 mm)	5.2	5.1	7.6	8.0	8.7	10.3	15.4	14.5	9.2	5.5	6.6	5.4	101.5
Average snowy days	6.5	5.5	4.0	0.2	0.0	0.0	0.0	0.0	0.0	0.2	1.6	4.1	22.3
Average relative humidity (%)	63.8	62.0	62.0	59.9	65.2	71.0	79.7	79.9	78.0	74.7	70.9	66.4	69.5
Mean monthly sunshine hours	187.3	183.8	203.5	215.4	234.5	196.0	145.1	155.8	152.8	176.9	164.2	182.5	2,197.8
Percentage possible sunshine	59.1	58.6	53.5	56.7	52.4	44.8	32.6	38.9	42.4	54.2	56.1	60.2	49.9
Source: Korea Meteorological Administration (snow and percent sunshine 1981–2010)

== Twin towns – sister cities ==
Bonghwa is twinned with:

- Gangdong-gu, South Korea
- Bucheon, South Korea
- Yeonje-gu, South Korea
- Tongchuan, China
- Selenge Province, Mongolia

== See also ==
- Geography of South Korea
- Baekdudaegan
