= Gunwi County =

Coordinates: 36°14′05″N 128°34′22″E

Gunwi
- County
- Flag Emblem of Gunwi

- Location in Daegu
- Country: South Korea
- Metropolitan City: Daegu
- Administrative divisions: 1 eup, 7 myeon

Area
  - Total: 614.34 km^{2} (237.20 sq mi)

Population (2024)
  - Total: 21,493
  - Density: 34.986/km^{2} (90.612/sq mi)
  - Dialect: Gyeongsang

Korean name
- Hangul: 군위군
- Hanja: 軍威郡
- RR: Gunwi-gun
- MR: Kunwi-gun

Gunwi County (Korean: 군위군) is a county in the Daegu Metropolitan City in South Korea.

== Incorporation into Daegu ==
Prior to June 30, 2023, Gunwi County was part of the North Gyeongsang Province. Under legislation enacted on January 3, 2023, the county was incorporated into Daegu Metropolitan City on July 1, 2023.

The incorporation was carried out at the request of Gunwi County, in return for permitting the relocation of Daegu International Airport to Sobo-myeon, Gunwi County.

== Administrative divisions ==
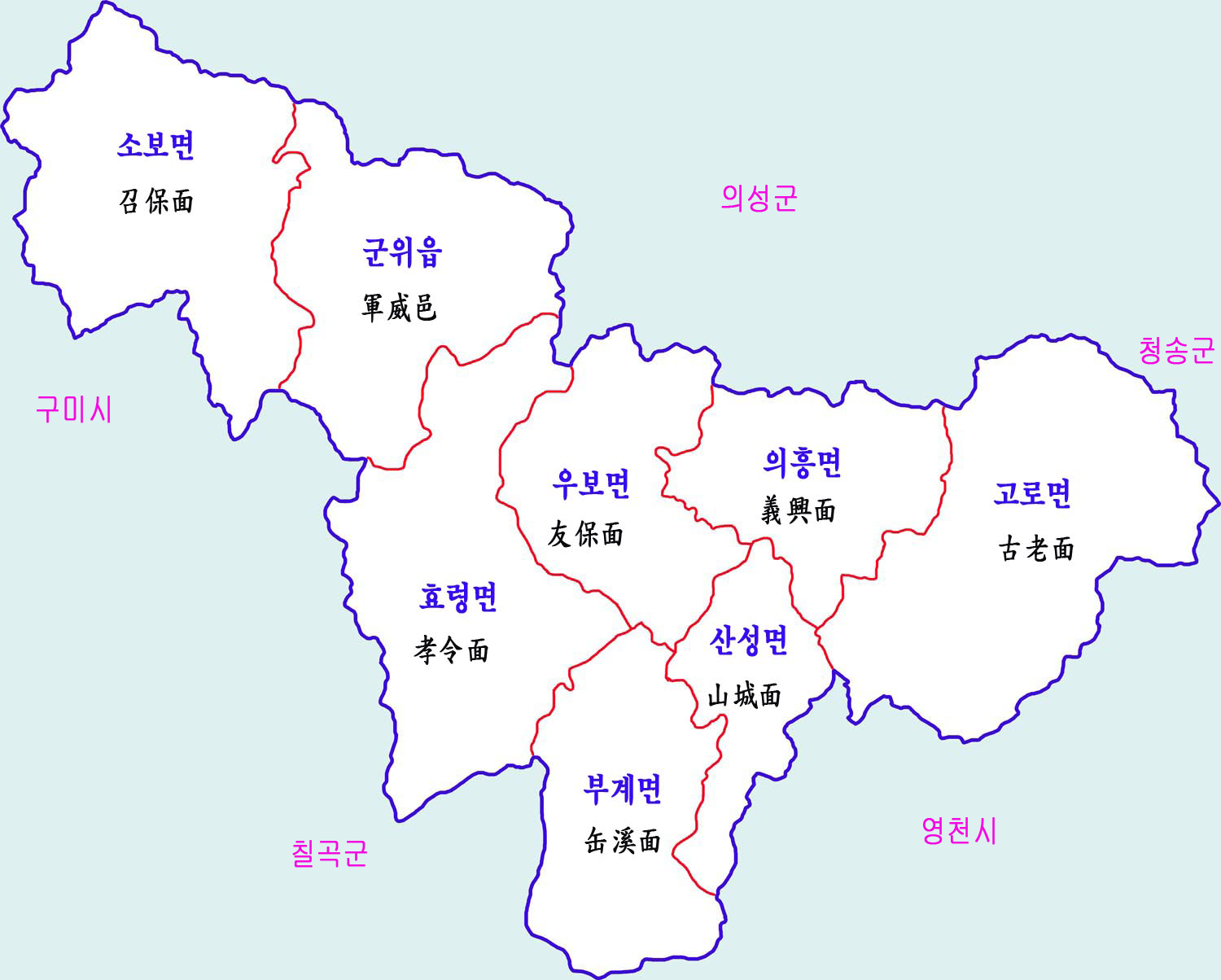
Map of Gunwi County in Korean

Gunwi County is divided into 1 eup and 7 myeon.

Map	Hangeul	Hanja
Gunwi-eup	군위읍	軍威邑
Sobo-myeon	소보면	召保面
Hyoryeong-myeon	효령면	孝令面
Bugye-myeon	부계면	缶溪面
Ubo-myeon	우보면	友保面
Uiheung-myeon	의흥면	義興面
Sanseong-myeon	산성면	山城面
Samgugyusa-myeon	삼국유사면	三國遺事面

== Demographics ==
Historical population
Year	Pop.	±%
1970	68,118	—
1980	53,460	−21.5%
1990	36,875	−31.0%
2000	28,747	−22.0%
2010	19,993	−30.5%
2020	22,096	+10.5%
Source: MODS

As of 2024, Gunwi County has a population of 21,493, of which 50.4% are male and 49.6% are female, compared to the national average of 50.1% and 49.9% respectively. People under 16 years old make up 3.8% of the population, and people over 65 years old make up 45.5%, compared to the national average of 10.5% and 19.5% respectively. Foreigners make up 3.1% of the total population, compared to 3.9% nationwide.

As of 2015, 28.8% of the population follow Buddhism, 17.9% follow Christianity (of which 14.4% Protestantism and 3.5% Catholicism), 1.1% follow other religions and 52.1% are irreligious.

== Climate ==
Gunwi has a humid continental climate (Köppen: Dwa).

Climate data for Gunwi (1993–2020 normals)
Month	Jan	Feb	Mar	Apr	May	Jun	Jul	Aug	Sep	Oct	Nov	Dec	Year
Mean daily maximum °C (°F)	4.2 (39.6)	7.4 (45.3)	13.5 (56.3)	20.1 (68.2)	25.5 (77.9)	28.7 (83.7)	30.5 (86.9)	31.2 (88.2)	26.6 (79.9)	21.0 (69.8)	13.5 (56.3)	6.1 (43.0)	19.0 (66.2)
Daily mean °C (°F)	−2.7 (27.1)	0.1 (32.2)	5.6 (42.1)	12.0 (53.6)	17.5 (63.5)	21.8 (71.2)	24.9 (76.8)	25.2 (77.4)	19.8 (67.6)	12.8 (55.0)	5.8 (42.4)	−1.0 (30.2)	11.8 (53.2)
Mean daily minimum °C (°F)	−8.6 (16.5)	−6.4 (20.5)	−1.5 (29.3)	4.3 (39.7)	10.1 (50.2)	15.9 (60.6)	20.6 (69.1)	20.9 (69.6)	15.1 (59.2)	7.0 (44.6)	−0.3 (31.5)	−6.7 (19.9)	5.9 (42.6)
Average precipitation mm (inches)	14.4 (0.57)	20.2 (0.80)	40.5 (1.59)	70.6 (2.78)	74.1 (2.92)	114.2 (4.50)	197.5 (7.78)	228.1 (8.98)	133.0 (5.24)	51.8 (2.04)	30.2 (1.19)	12.9 (0.51)	987.5 (38.88)
Average precipitation days (≥ 0.1 mm)	2.9	3.5	5.8	6.8	6.9	8.3	12.3	12.1	8.0	4.9	4.8	2.9	79.2
Source: Korea Meteorological Administration
