= Seongju County =

Seongju
- County
- Flag Emblem of Seongju

- Location in South Korea
- Country: South Korea
- Region: Yeongnam
- Administrative divisions: 1 eup, 9 myeon

Area
  - Total: 616.28 km^{2} (237.95 sq mi)

Population (September 2024)
  - Total: 41,591
  - Density: 82.8/km^{2} (214/sq mi)
  - Dialect: Gyeongsang

Korean name
- Hangul: 성주군
- Hanja: 星州郡
- RR: Seongju-gun
- MR: Sŏngju-gun

Seongju County (Korean: 성주군) is a county in North Gyeongsang Province, South Korea. This largely agricultural area is located immediately west of the metropolitan city of Daegu. The capital of the county is the town of Seongju.

Lotte Skyhill Seongju Country Club (36.049359°N 128.226223°E) was selected as the location for the deployment of Terminal High Altitude Area Defense (THAAD) system in July 2016.

Seongju County is famous for its production of oriental melons. Farms in the county comprise about 70% of total oriental melon production in the country.

== Administrative divisions ==
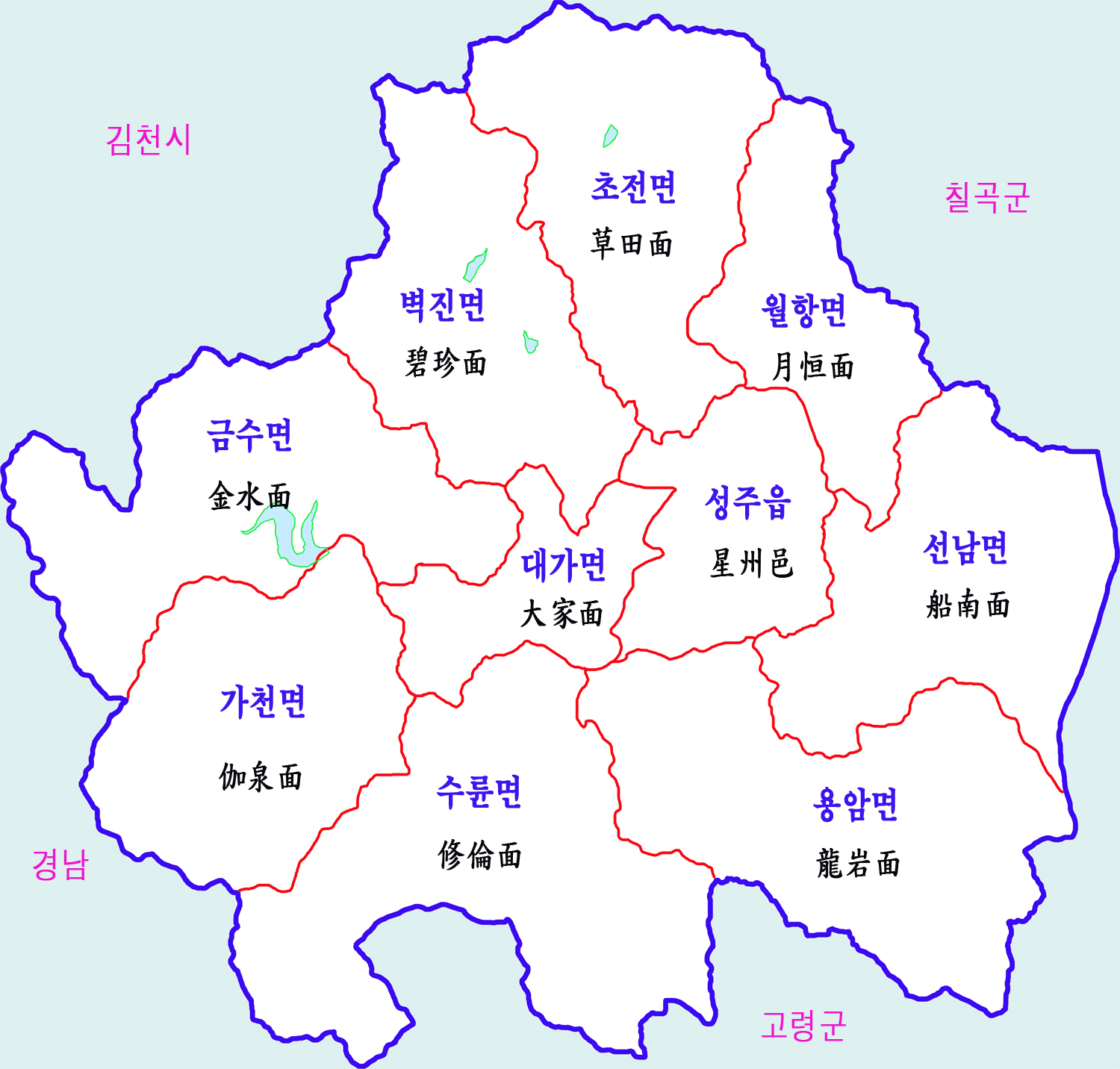
Map of Seongju County in Korean

Seongju County is divided into 1 eup and 9 myeon.

Name	Hangeul	Hanja
Seongju-eup	성주읍	星州邑
Seonnam-myeon	선남면	船南面
Yongam-myeon	용암면	龍岩面
Suryun-myeon	수륜면	修倫面
Gacheon-myeon	가천면	伽泉面
Geumsu-myeon	금수면	金水面
Daega-myeon	대가면	大家面
Byeokjin-myeon	벽진면	碧珍面
Chojeon-myeon	초전면	草田面
Wolhang-myeon	월항면	月恒面

== Twin towns – sister cities ==
- Gwanak-gu, South Korea (2005)
