= Eup (administrative division) =

Administrative unit of Korea

- Hangul: 읍
- Hanja: 邑
- RR: eup
- MR: ŭp

An eup or ŭp (Korean: 읍) is an administrative unit in both North Korea and South Korea similar to the unit of town.

== In South Korea ==
Along with "myeon", an "eup" is one of the divisions of a county ("gun"), and of some cities ("si") with a population of less than 500,000. The main town or towns in a county—or the secondary town or towns within a city's territory—are designated as "eup"s. Towns are subdivided into villages ("ri"). In order to form an eup, the minimum population required is 20,000.

== See also ==
- Administrative divisions of North Korea
- Administrative divisions of South Korea
