= Jeonju Hyanggyo =

Pre-modern academy in Jeonju, South Korea

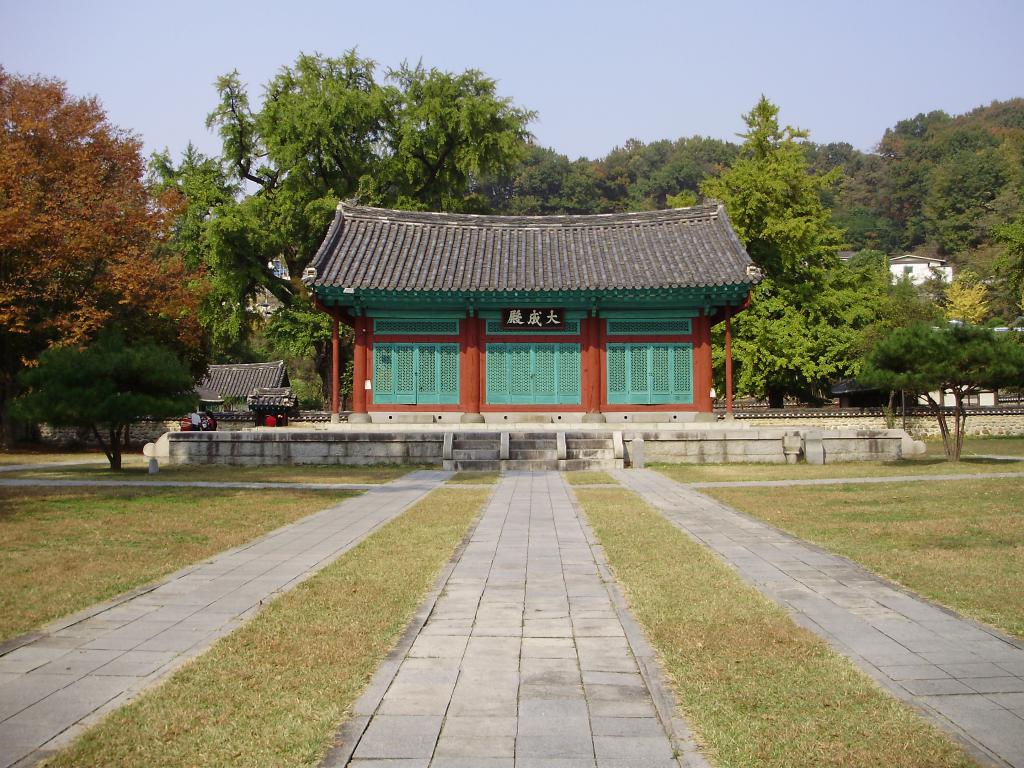
- Daeseongjeon in the hyanggyo (2010)
- Interactive map of the Jeonju Hyanggyo area

Design and construction
- Designations

Historic Sites of South Korea
- Official name: Jeonjuhyanggyo Local Confucian School
- Designated: 1992-12-2
- Reference no.: 379

Korean name
- Hangul: 전주향교
- Hanja: 全州鄕校
- RR: Jeonju hyanggyo
- MR: Chŏnju hyanggyo

The Jeonju Hyanggyo (Korean: 전주향교; Hanja: 全州鄕校) is a hyanggyo (school) originally established at the Gyeonggijeon Shrine site in Jeonju, Korea, sometime early in the 15th century, during the Joseon Dynasty (1392-1910). Gyeonggijeon Shrine was erected in 1410, so construction of the Jeonju Hyanggyo had to follow sometime later.

At the time of the Second Japanese Invasion in 1592 the Gyeonggijeon Shrine and the Jeonju Hyanggyo were completely destroyed. In 1603 the hyanggyo was moved to and rebuilt at its present Jeonju location.

Unlike the more typical hyanggyo Jeonhakhumyo style described above at the Goheung Hyanggyo, the Jeonju Hyanggyo employees the less conventional style of being placed on level ground. The memorial enshrinement area centers on the Daeseongjeon (Confucian shrine hall) in the front, while the educational area centers on the Myeongyundang (lecture hall) that is located the rear. This is an unusual configuration for a hyanggyo. In all, there are a total of 99 rooms at the Jeonju Hyanggyo.

The Jeonju Hyanggyo is designated historical treasure #379.

== Gallery ==
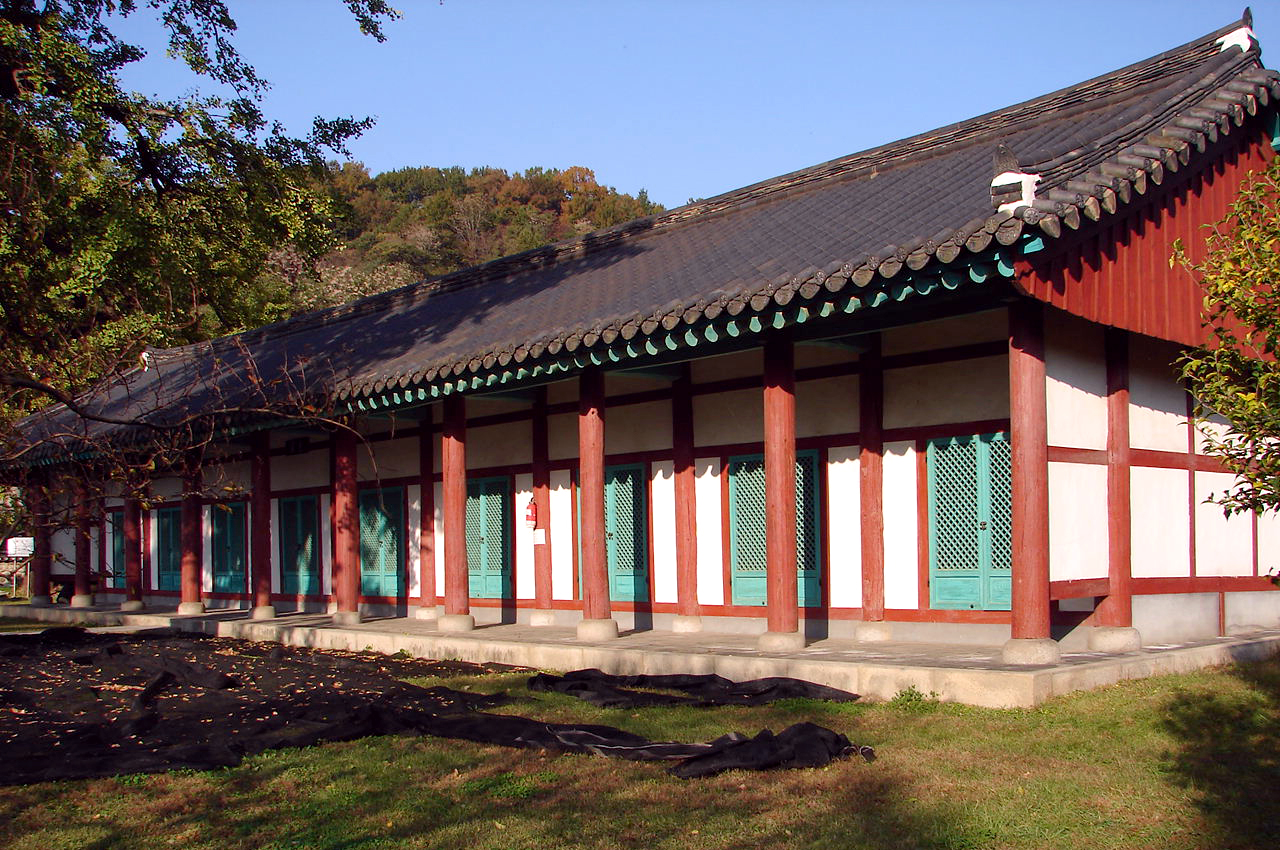
Jeonju Hyanggyo hall

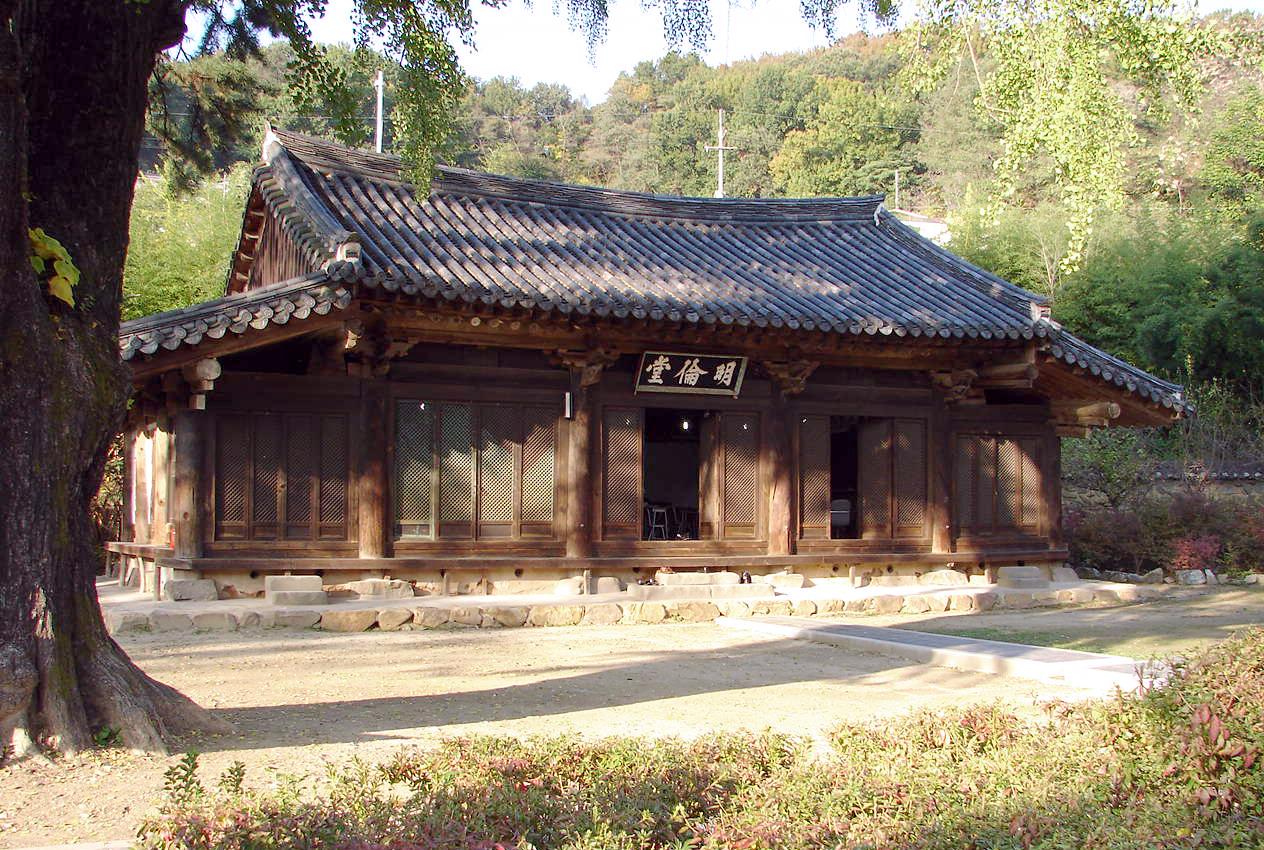
Myungryundang (lecture hall)

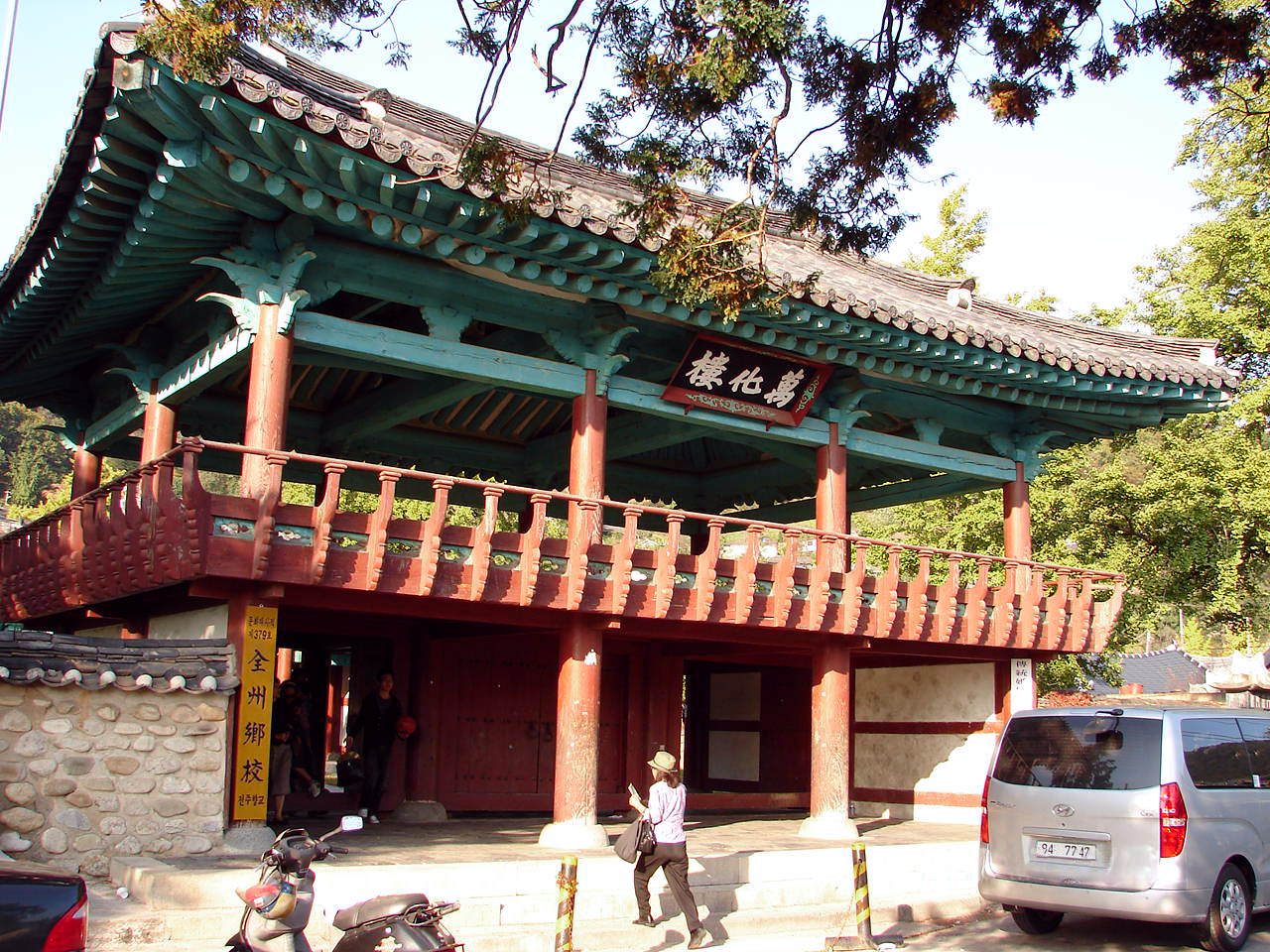
Outer Gate

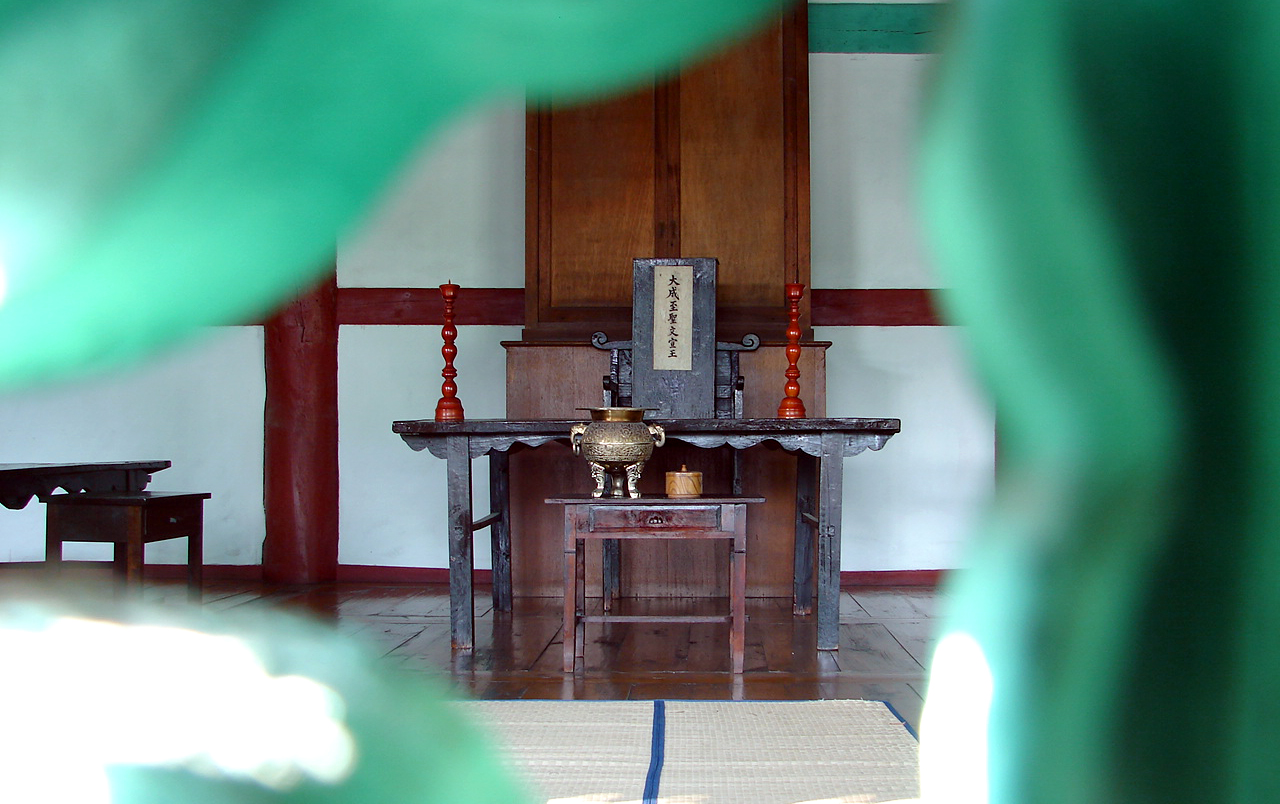
Ancestor tablet inside Daeseongjeon (shrine hall)
