= Ssangchungsa =

Coordinates: 34.527778°N 127.131667°E

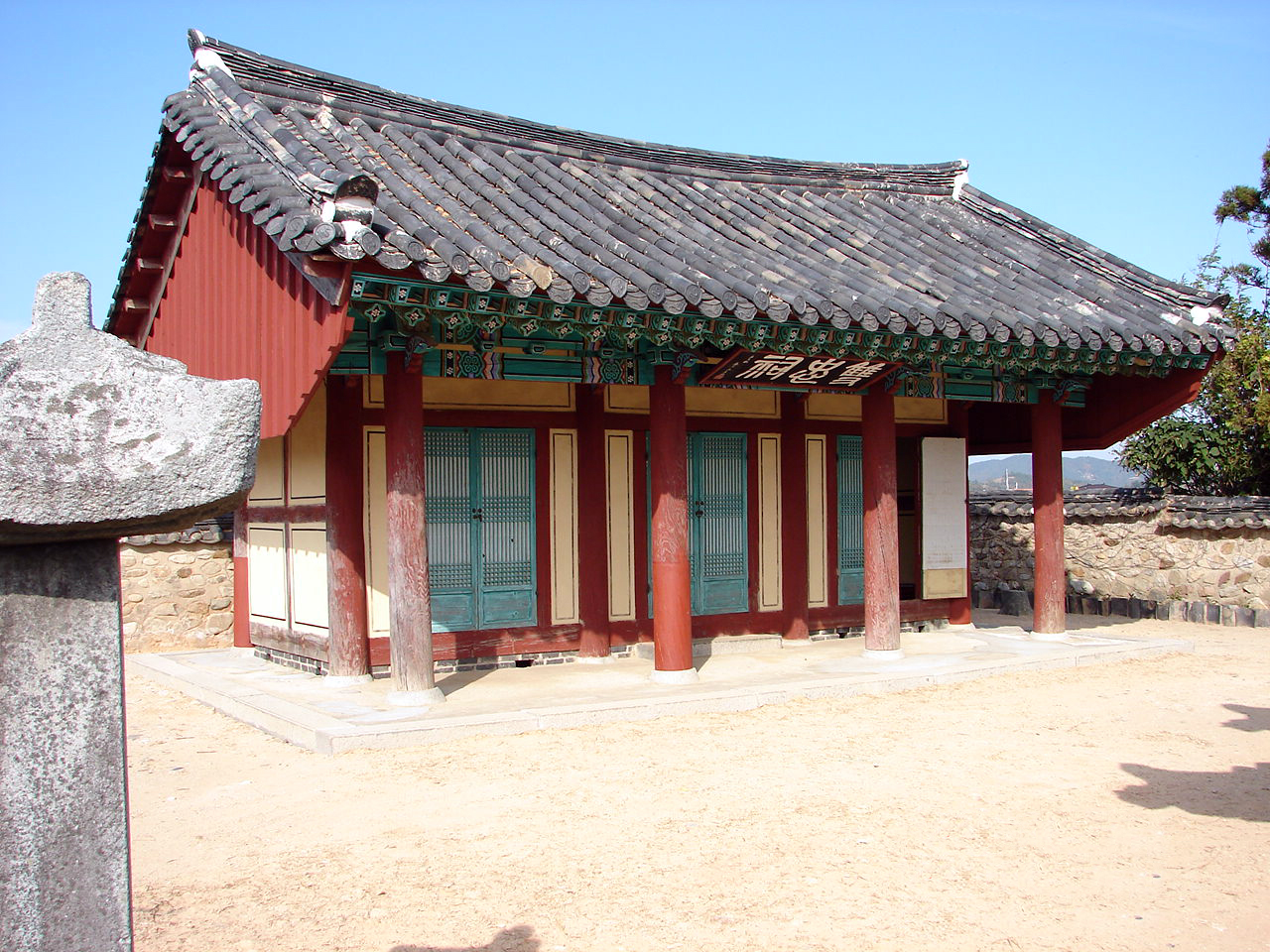
- Ssangchungsa (shrine)

Korean name
- Hangul: 쌍충사
- Hanja: 雙忠祠
- RR: Ssangchungsa
- MR: Ssangch'ungsa

Ssangchungsa is a shrine in Doyang (known also as Nokdong by many) on the southwesternmost point of the peninsula that comprises Goheung County South Korea. The shrine commemorates and is dedicated to the memories of two Joseon Dynasty era naval officer war heroes.

A memorial worship service is held here every April.

Ssangchungsa is designated Monument #128

== History ==
The original shrine dedicated to Yi Dae-won was constructed in 1587 on Nokdo Island but was destroyed during the Japanese invasions of Korea (1592–1598). The shrine was subsequently rebuilt and rededicated to both Chung Wun and Yi Dae-won.

Ssangchungsa's main worship hall we see today was constructed in 1946 with the lecture hall being added in 1957.

The four structures on the grounds presently were renovated and expanded in 1969–1970.

== Heroes ==
=== Jeong Un ===
Jeong Un (1543–1592) was a son of a military officer. He passed the Military Examination in 1570 at the age of 28 and became Lieutenant of Geumgapdo (the Right Jeolla Province Navy), and later Magistrate of Ungcheon (the Right Kyungsang Navy).

In 1591, Jeong Un was appointed Captain of Nokdo (the Left Jeolla Navy) and fought against the Japanese under the command of Admiral Yi Sun-sin. Jeong Un died defending the country against the Japanese in the invasion known as the Japanese invasions of Korea (1592–1598) in 1592. Captain Jeong Un was Admiral Yi Sun-sin's most trusted captain.

=== Yi Dae-won ===
Yi Dae-won (1566–1587) passed the Military Examination in 1583 at the age of 17 and became Captain of Nokdo in 1586 when he was 20 years old. On 10 February 1587 the next year, about 20 vessels of Japanese pirates led by Wokou (alternate spelling: Waegu), guided by a Korean traitor Sa Hwa Dong, conducted a raid on Sonjuk Island (alternate spelling: Sondae) in what is now Goheung County, South Jeolla Province. Captain Yi Dae-won defeated the pirates and took Wokou prisoner.

When the royal court was informed of Yi Dae-won's victory on 10 February from the Governor of Jeolla province, the king terminated Shim Am and appointed Captain Yi as Commander of the Left Jeolla Navy. But Yi Dae-won was killed before he could receive the royal decree ordering his promotion.

On 17 February 1587 the Japanese pirates conducted a second raid on Sonjuk Island. Captain Yi, outnumbered by the enemy, called for a rescue. However, one of his superiors, Commander Shim Am (Commander of the Left Jeolla Navy) being jealous of Captain Yi's feats, failed to respond allowing Captain Yi's defeat and subsequent death at the hands of the Japanese pirates. Shim Am was executed on 4 April 1587 as a result of this failure to respond.

== Gallery ==
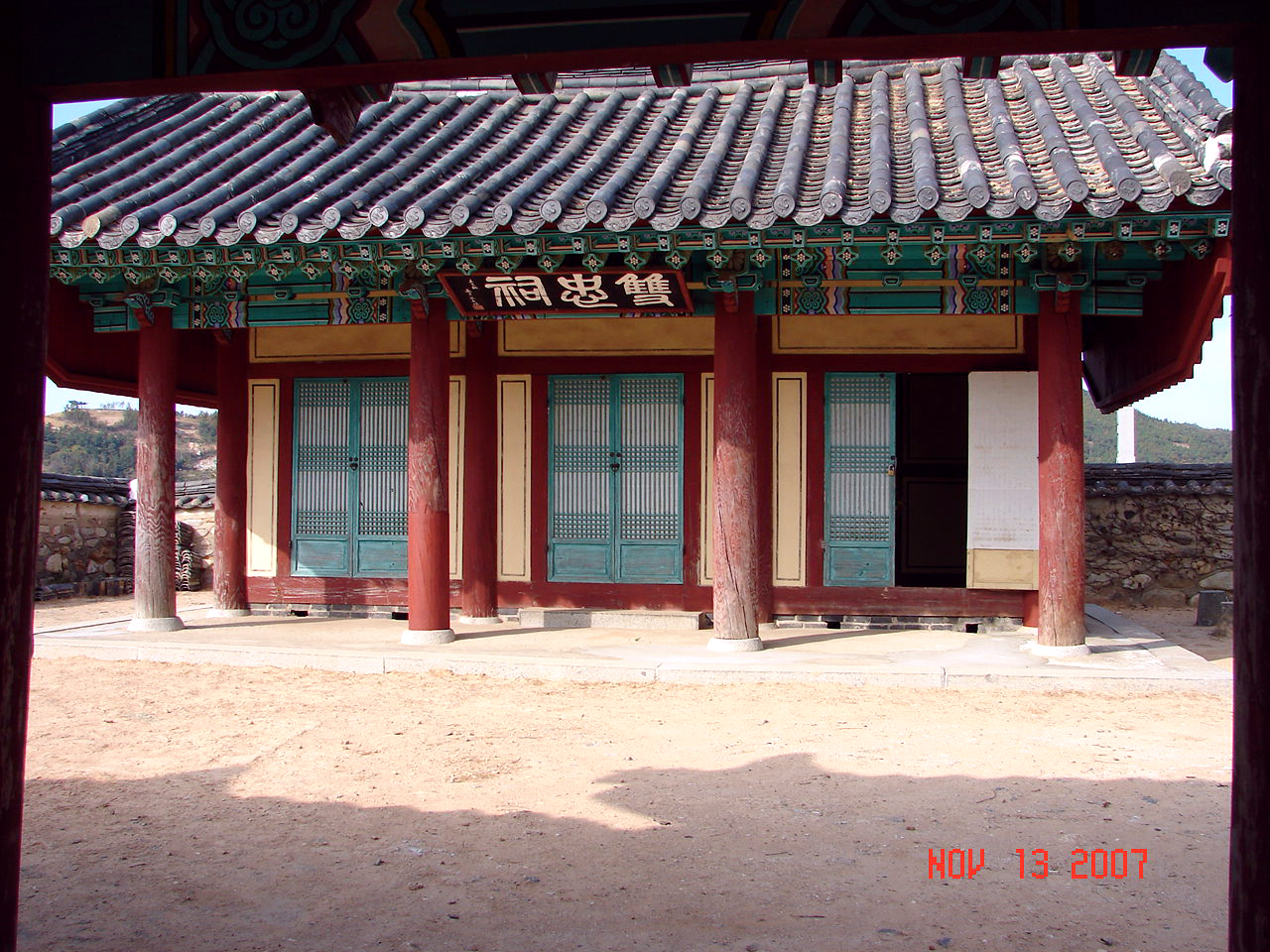
Ssangchungsa Main Worship Hall

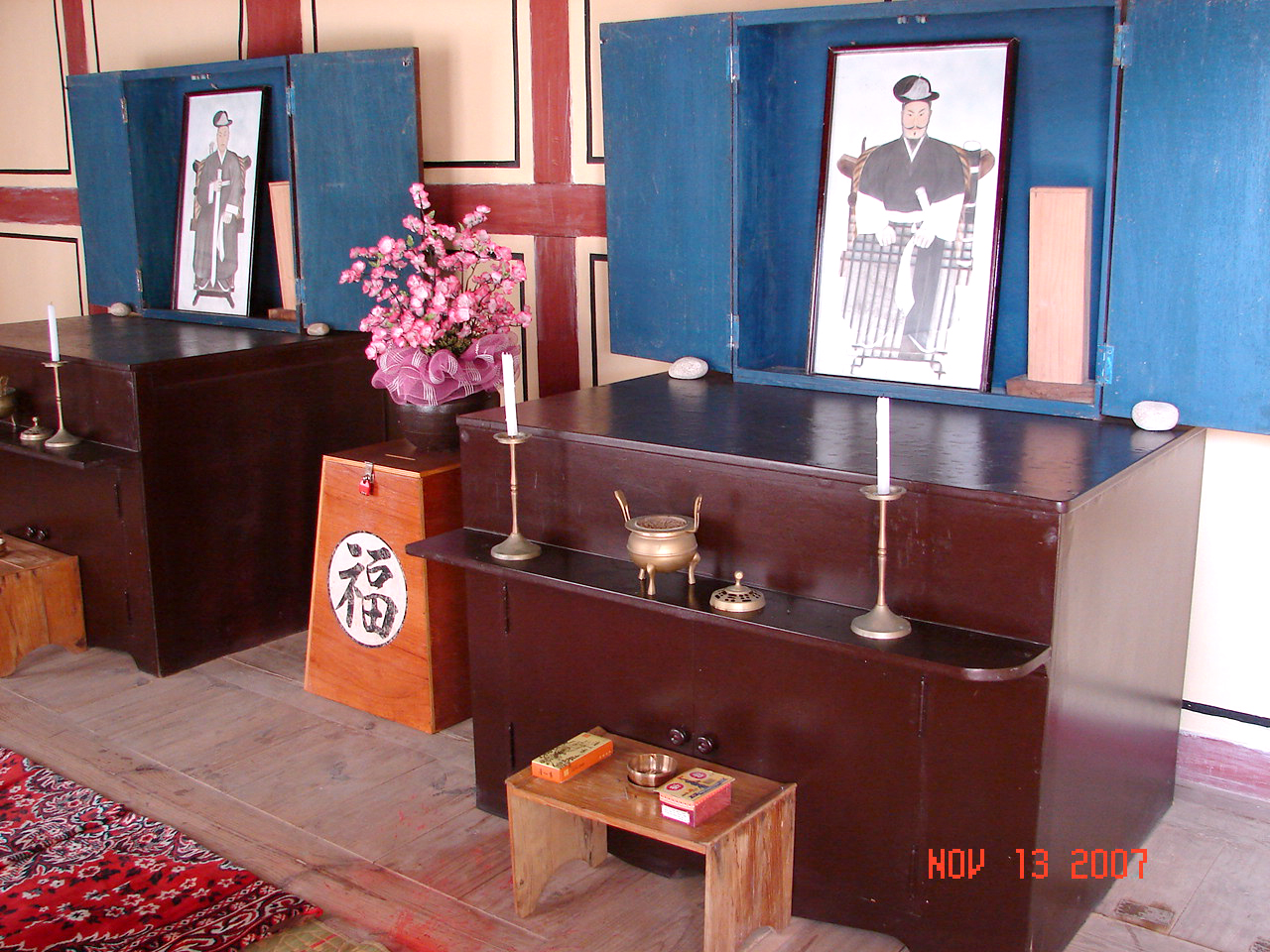
Ssangchungsa inside Main Worship Hall

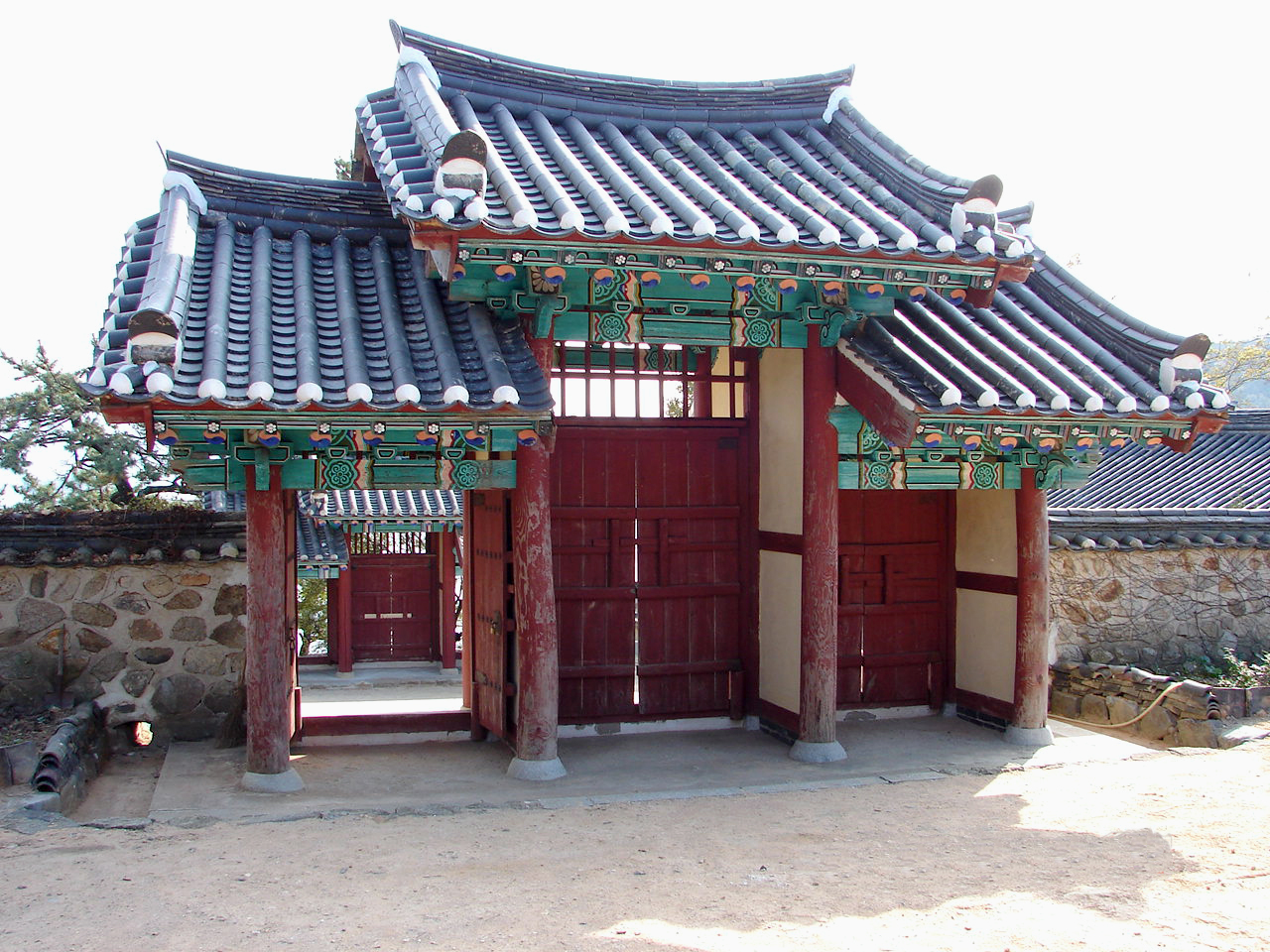
Ssangchungsa inner gate

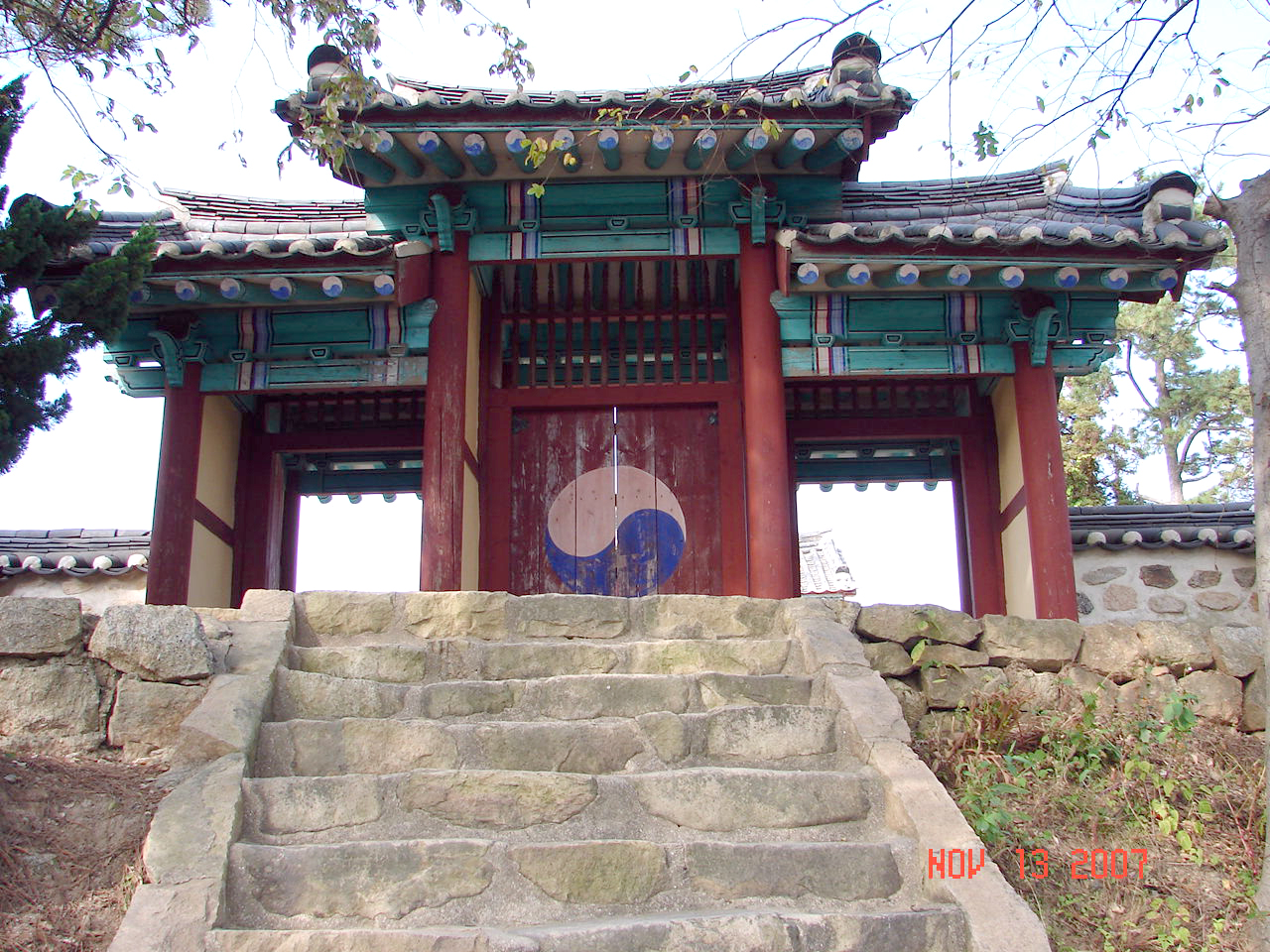
Ssangchungsa outer gate entrance
