= Daegu Hyanggyo =

Pre-modern academy in Daegu, South Korea

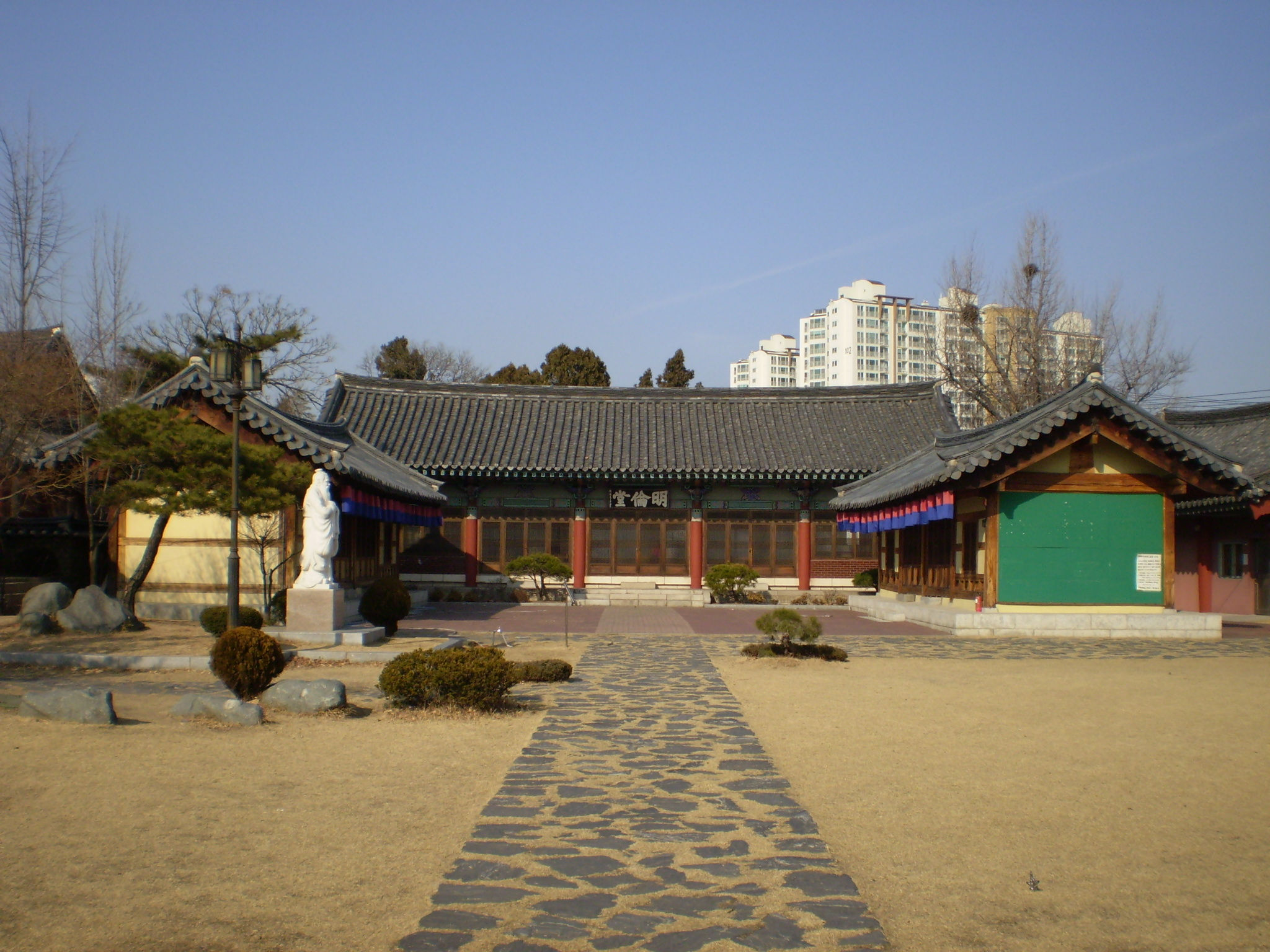
- Myeongnyundang lecture hall at the Daegu Hyanggyo

Korean name
- Hangul: 대구향교
- Hanja: 大邱鄕校
- RR: Daegu hyanggyo
- MR: Taegu hyanggyo

The Daegu Hyanggyo (Korean: 대구향교) is a hyanggyo in Daegu, South Korea. A hyanggyo is a state-sponsored academy where students studied to prepare for the gwageo, the civil service examinations during the Goryeo (918–1392) and Joseon (1392–1910) periods. This hyanggyo was founded in 1398 during the reign of King Taejo of Joseon.

== History ==
The hyanggyo was founded in 1398 during the reign of King Taejo of Joseon.

During the Second Japanese Invasion in 1592 it was completely burned down. In 1599 the Daegu Hyanggyo was rebuilt near Dalseong Park but was relocated to the original 1398 site of Dalseong Park in 1605 and then back to the Gyodong area again. 1932 saw the hyanggyo again relocated to its present location in Namsandong, just south of downtown Daegu. In 1973 Hyanggyo at Daegu underwent a full restoration.

== Buildings ==
There are two main buildings in the hyanggyo, Myeongyundang, the lecture hall and Daeseongjeon, the Confucian shrine hall. The original traditional layout of a hyanggyo has the Daeseongjeon located in front of Myeongnyundang as it was when first built. Today the layout finds the Daeseongjeon centered in the north, facing the wide courtyard, with the Myeongnyundang found to the right of Daeseongjeon when entering.

== Memorial tablets ==
Daeseongjeon houses memorial tablets where every year in the 2nd and 8th lunar month a ritual called Seokjeon-daejae is conducted honoring Confucius and famous Confucian scholars of Daegu.

== Current use ==
Myeongnyundang now serves as a classroom where lectures and lesson on old Chinese characters and traditional Korean etiquette is taught. On weekends and holidays traditional Korean weddings are held at garden on the complex grounds.

Daeseongjeon is designated as City of Daegu Local Cultural Material #1.

== Gallery ==
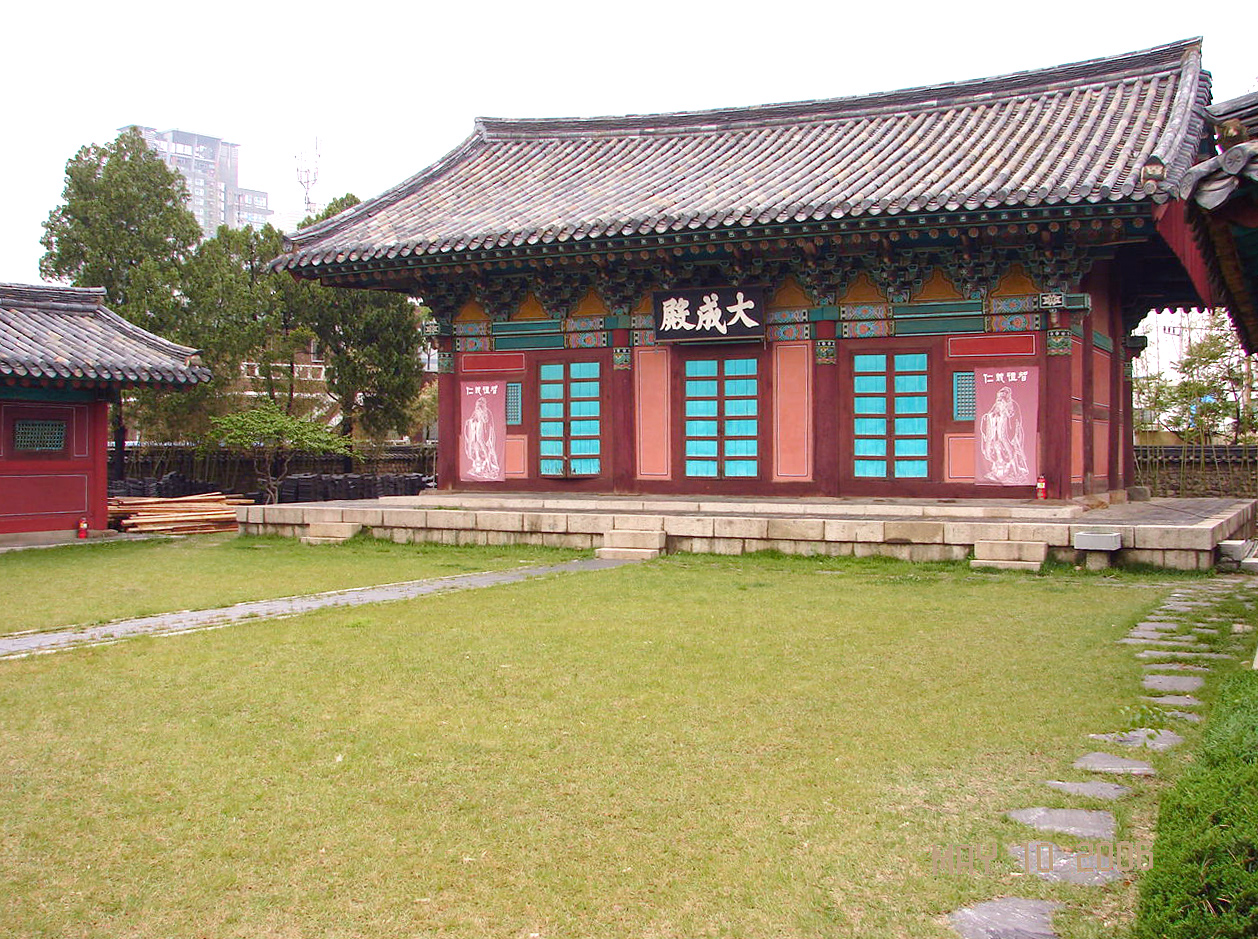
Daeseongjeon (shrine hall) City of Daegu Local Cultural Material #1

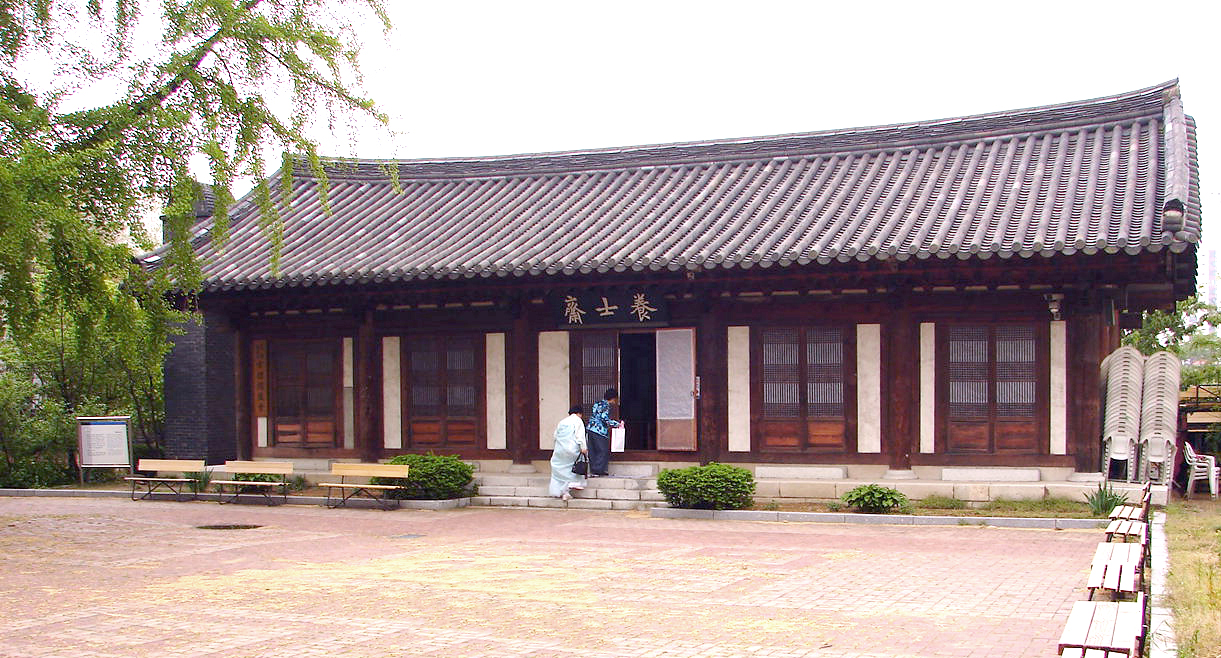
One of the auxiliary halls on the hyanggyo grounds

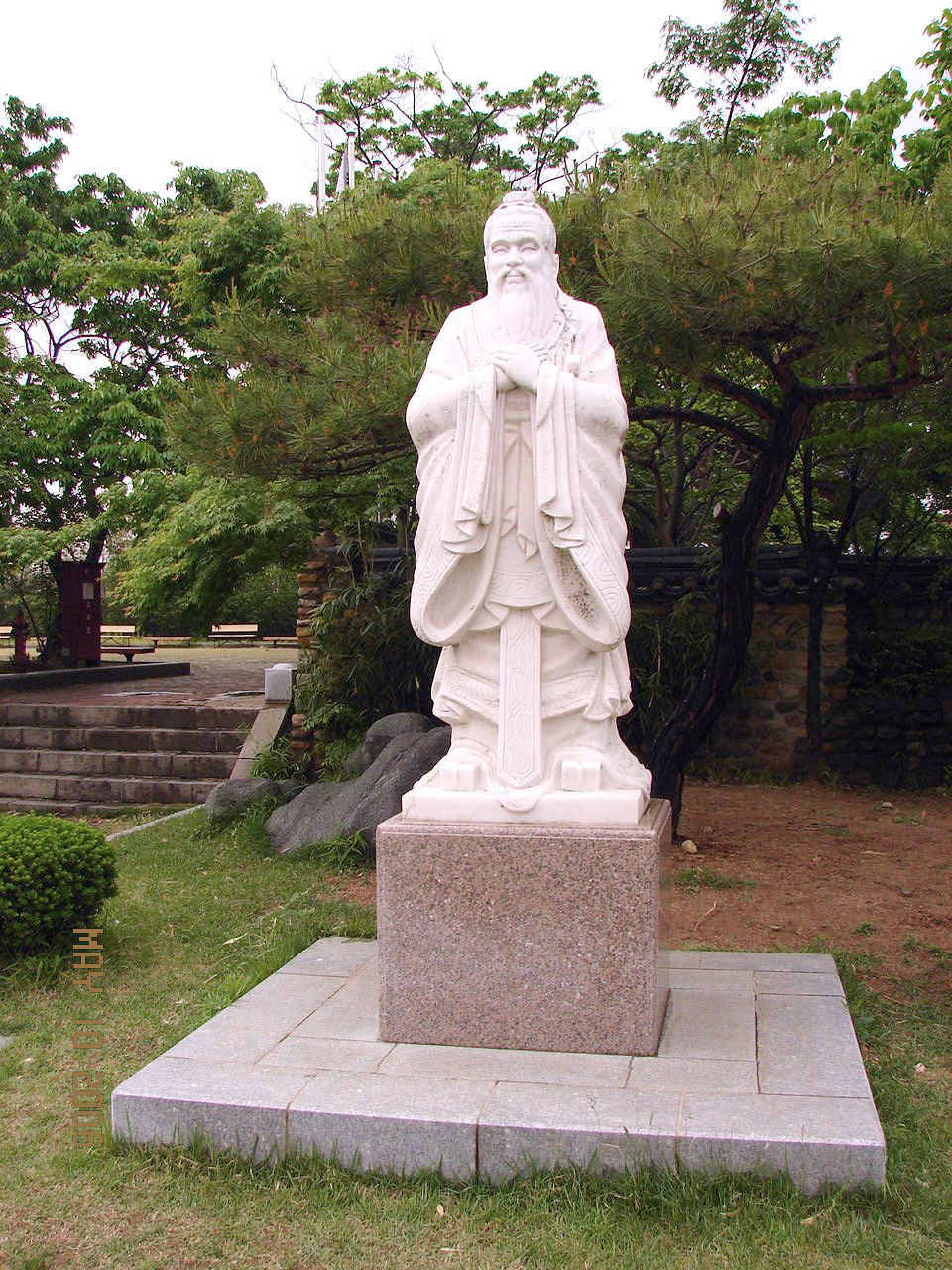
Statue of Confucius on complex grounds

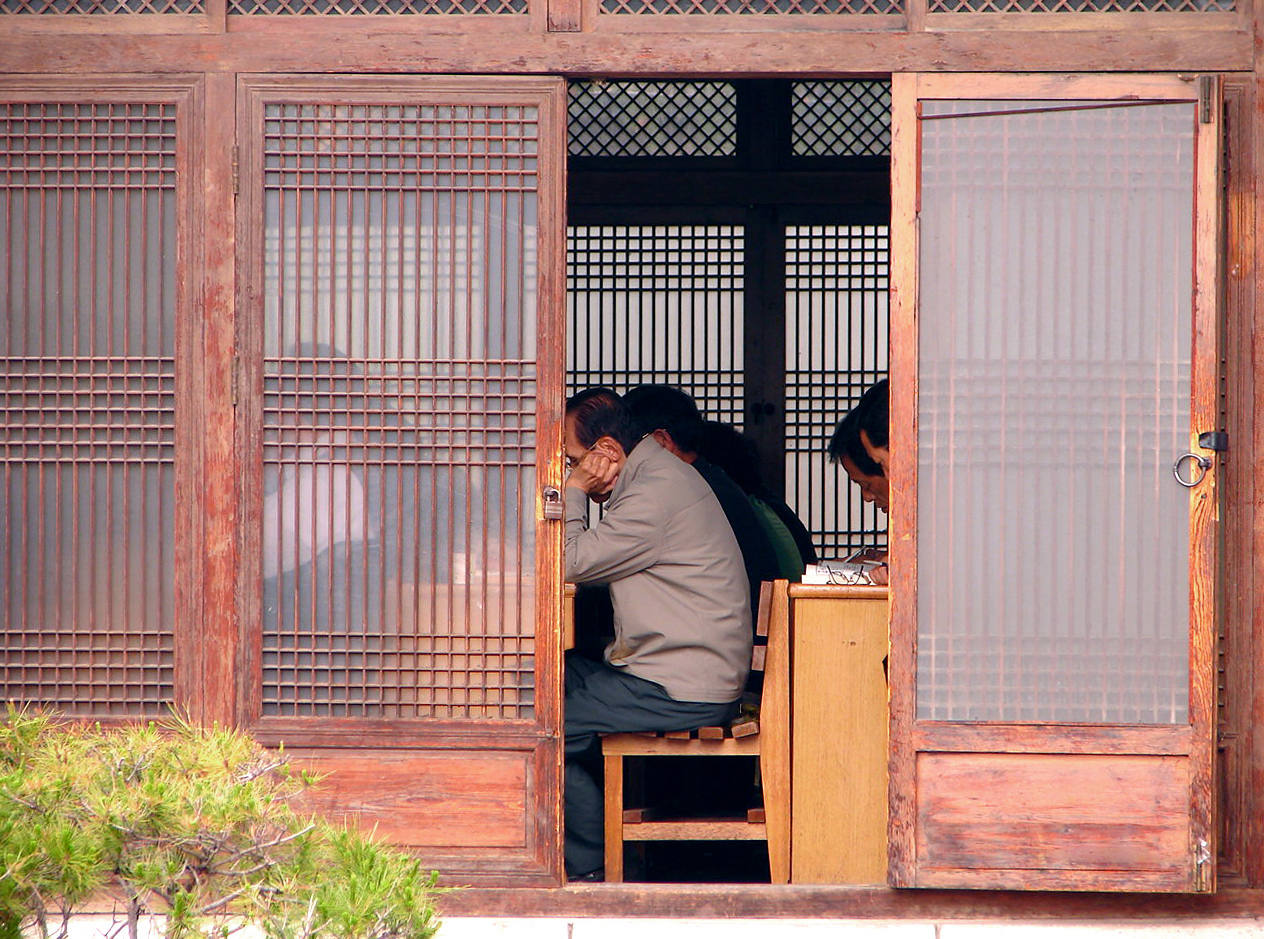
Classes in Myeongryeondang
