= Hyanggyo =

Provincial schools in pre-modern Korea

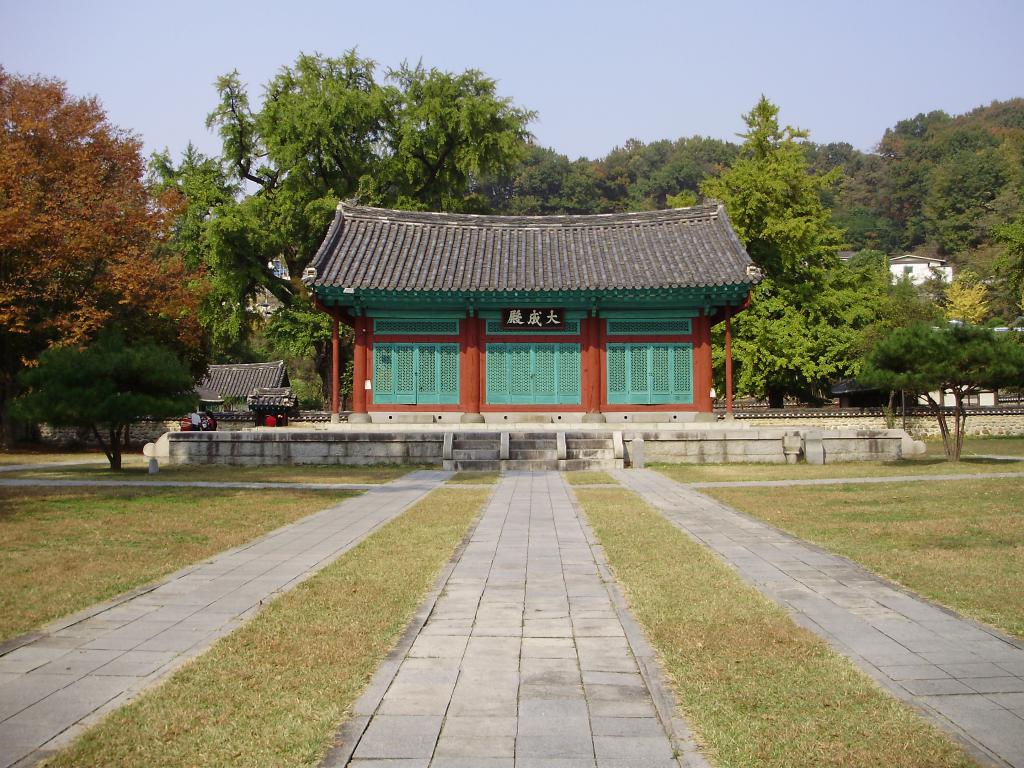
- Daeseongjeon Hall of Jeonju hyanggyo in Jeonju, Jeollabuk-do

Korean name
- Hangul: 향교
- Hanja: 鄕校
- RR: hyanggyo
- MR: hyanggyo

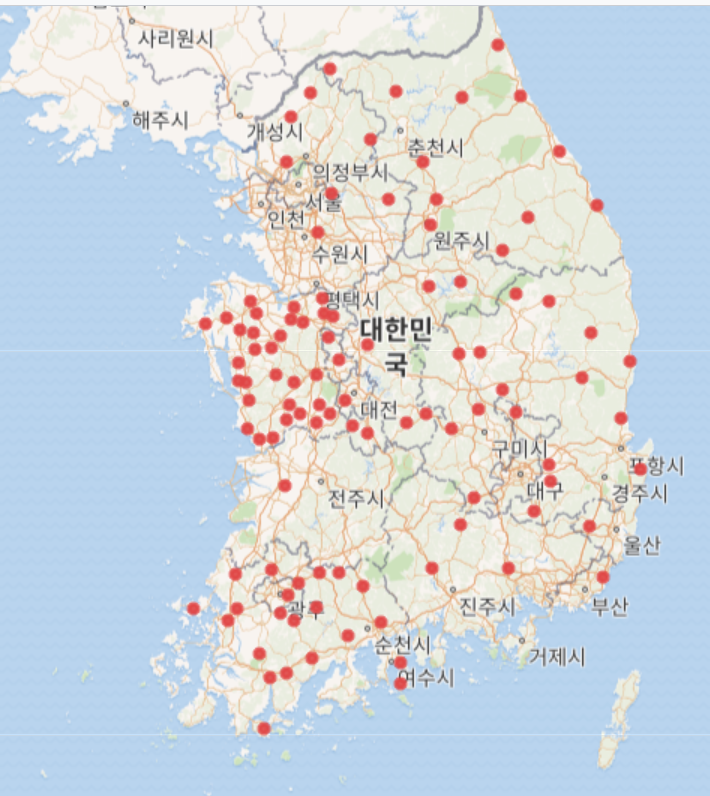
Map of 107 Hanggyo

Hyanggyo (Korean: 향교; Hanja: 鄕校) were government-run provincial Confucian schools established during the Goryeo (918–1392), and Joseon (July 1392 – August 1910) periods in Korea. They were established to educate and train officials in Confucian ideals and the ethics of government. In the Joseon period, when Neo-Confucianism replaced Buddhism as the ruling ideology, the government needed to promote the new ideology to create a new social order based on Neo-Confucianism. During this period also, teachers at Hyanggyo received land, royalties, and slaves from the government.

They were officially closed near the end of the Joseon Dynasty, in 1894, but many were reopened as public elementary schools in 1900. They were not widely used during either period.

In the Joseon period, hyanggyo were established in every bu, mok, daedohobu, dohobu, gun, and hyeon (the last corresponding roughly to the size of modern-day cities and counties). They served primarily the children of the yangban, or ruling elite upper-class. Education was oriented toward the gwageo, or national civil service examinations. Although such education was in high demand, the hyanggyo were ultimately unable to compete with the privately run seowon and seodang.

== See also ==
- List of hyanggyo
- Daegu Hyanggyo
- Goheung Hyanggyo
- Gyeongju Hyanggyo
- Jeonju Hyanggyo
- Education in the Joseon Dynasty
- Seonggyungwan
- Seowon
- Ganghwa hyanggyo
