= Neunggasa =

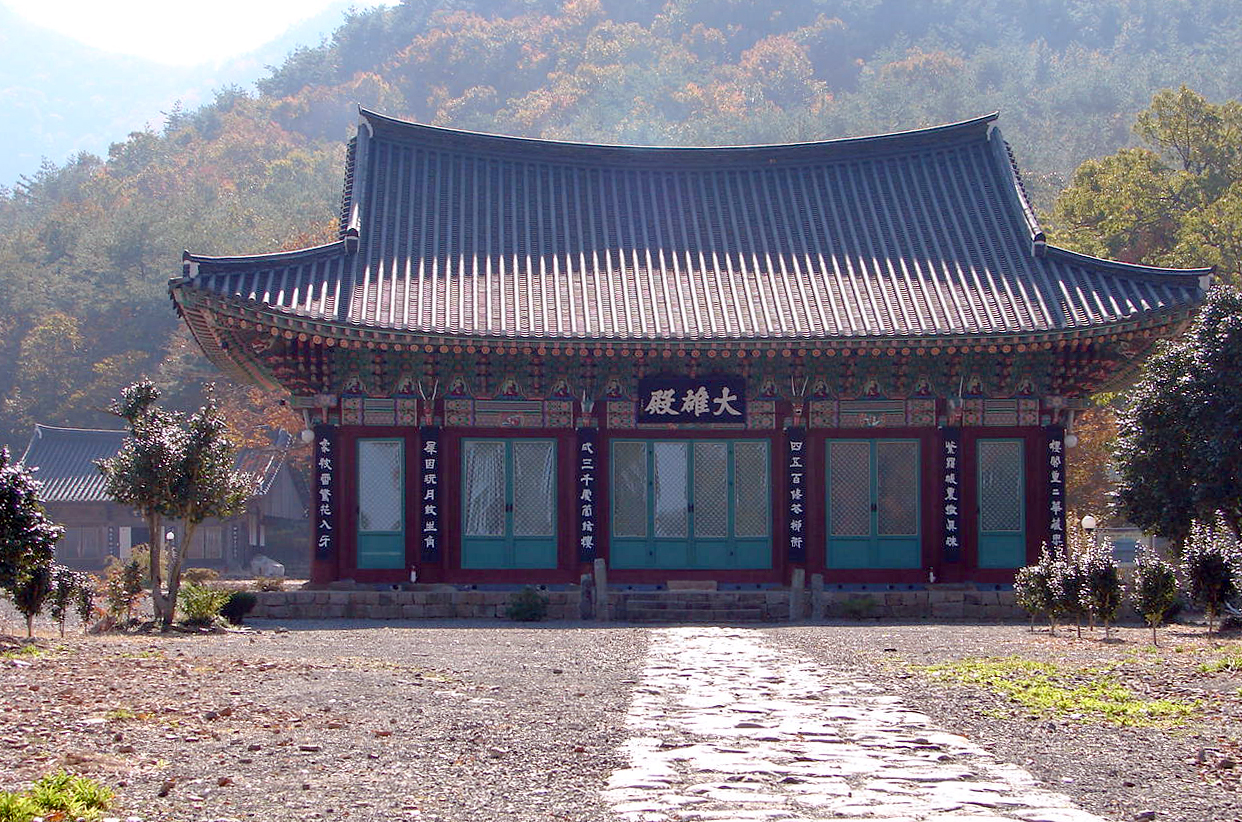
- Neunggasa (Neungga Buddhist Temple) at base of Mountain Palyeong in South Jeolla province.

- Location within South Korea

Religion
- Affiliation: Buddhism

Location
- State: Goheung-gun County
- Country: South Korea
- Coordinates: 34°38′21″N 127°24′51″E

Architecture
- Completed: 419

Korean name
- Hangul: 능가사
- Hanja: 楞伽寺
- RR: Neunggasa
- MR: Nŭnggasa

Neunggasa is a Korean Buddhist temple located in Yeongnam-myeon township, Goheung-gun County, Jeollanam-do, South Korea.

This small temple complex rests at the base of Palyeong Mountain (팔영산, 八影山) and Recreational Forest area, also known as Eight Peak Mountain, in Goheung county.

== History ==
Neunggasa was established in 419 and originally called Bohyeonsa by Monk Adohwasang. The temple was destroyed during the Japanese Invasion in 1592. In 1644, the temple was rebuilt as Neunggasa by Monk Jeonghyeon.

== Temple Treasures ==
There are five Tangible Cultural Properties and Treasures found at the Neungga Temple complex.

=== Tangible Cultural Property #69 ===
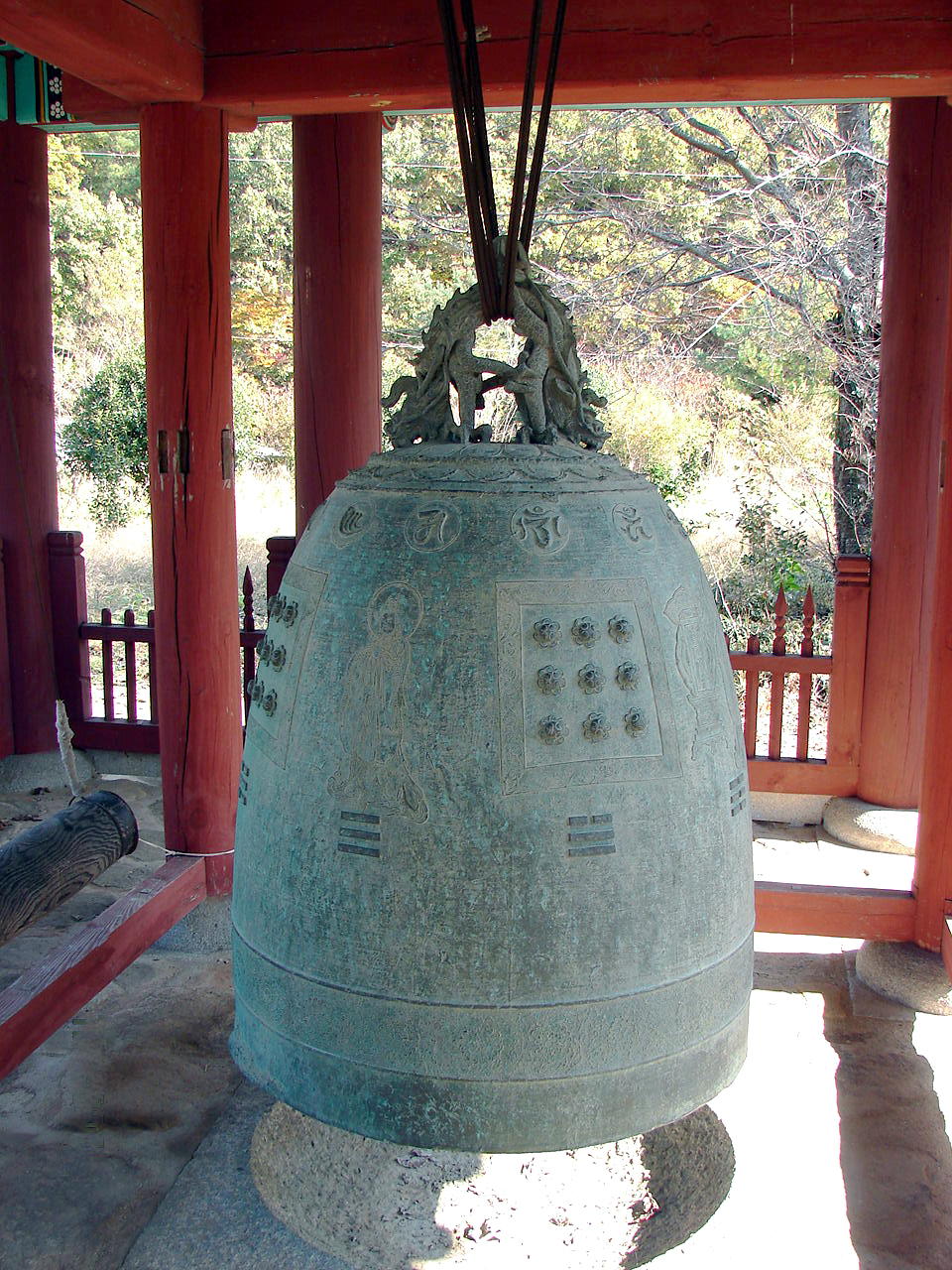

Bronze Bell of Neunggasa.

This large bronze bell weighs 900 kg/1984 lb and was cast in 1698 during King Sukjong's reign. Two dragons holding beads, called Yeouiju, are engraved on the hook suspending the bell (Yongnyu).

On the upper part of the bell are engraved 'Beomja' (an ancient Indian letter in Sanskrit), found along with standing Bodhisattvas.

The lower part of bell is decorated with Dangchomun, a pattern of flowers and long spreading vines. A Dangchomun symbolizes longevity, everlastingness, and the carrying on of a family line.

The design of eight divination symbols in the center of the bell is a unique design which has never been found on any other of the temple bells from the Joseon Dynasty.

=== Tangible Cultural Property #70 ===
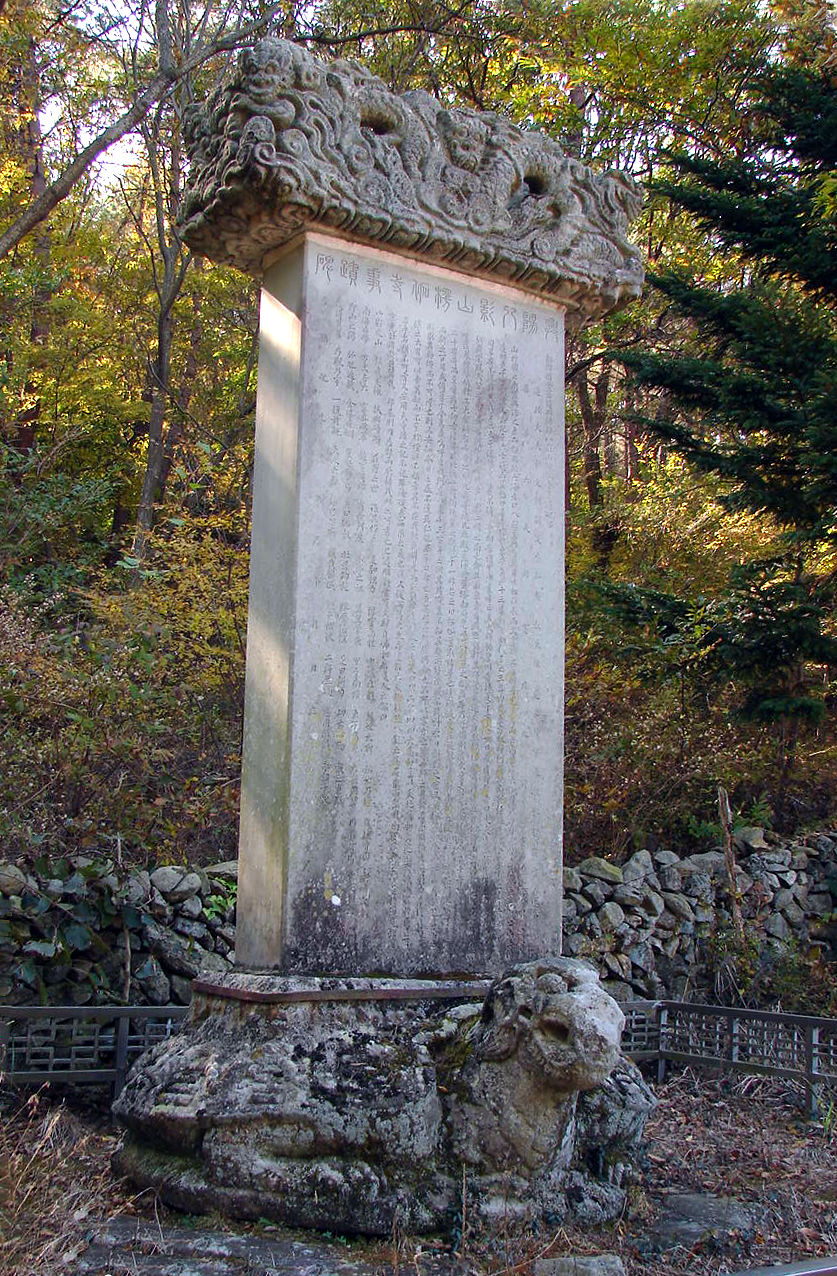

Neunggasasajeokbi (Neungga Temple monument).

This monument was erected in 1690, by Monk Mokdeok to record and commemorate the activities of Monk Adohwasang.

Monk Adohwasang established Neunggasa in 419, the reign under King Nulji (417-458), of the Silla (57 BCE - 935 CE).

The turtle shaped base of the monument supports an oblong natural stone pedestal on which an epitaph is engraved. The epitaph states that Neungga Temple was originally called Bohyeon Temple before being rebuilt as Neunggasa in 1644.

The monument is topped off with an ornately carved capstone.

=== Tangible Cultural Property #224 ===
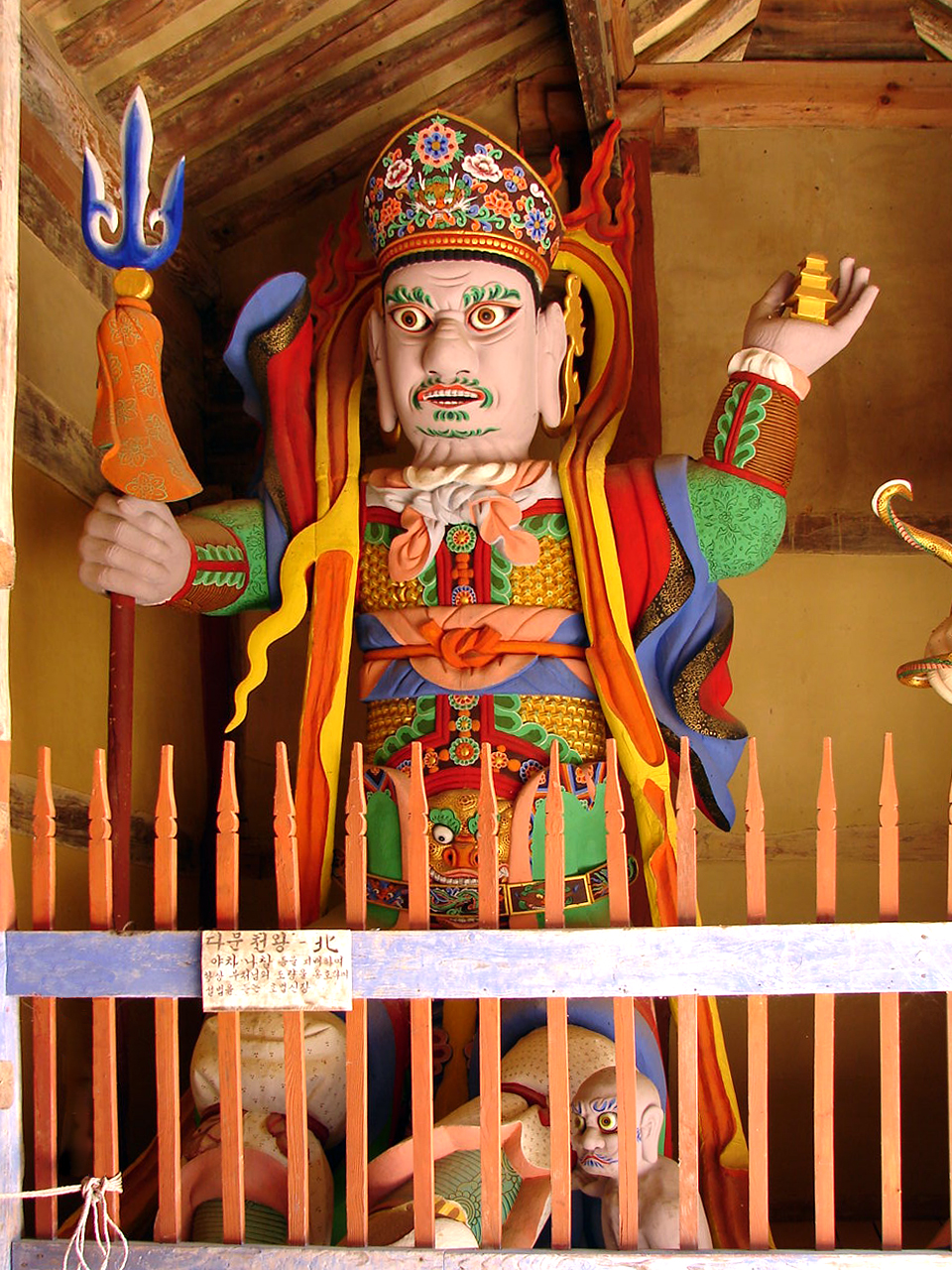

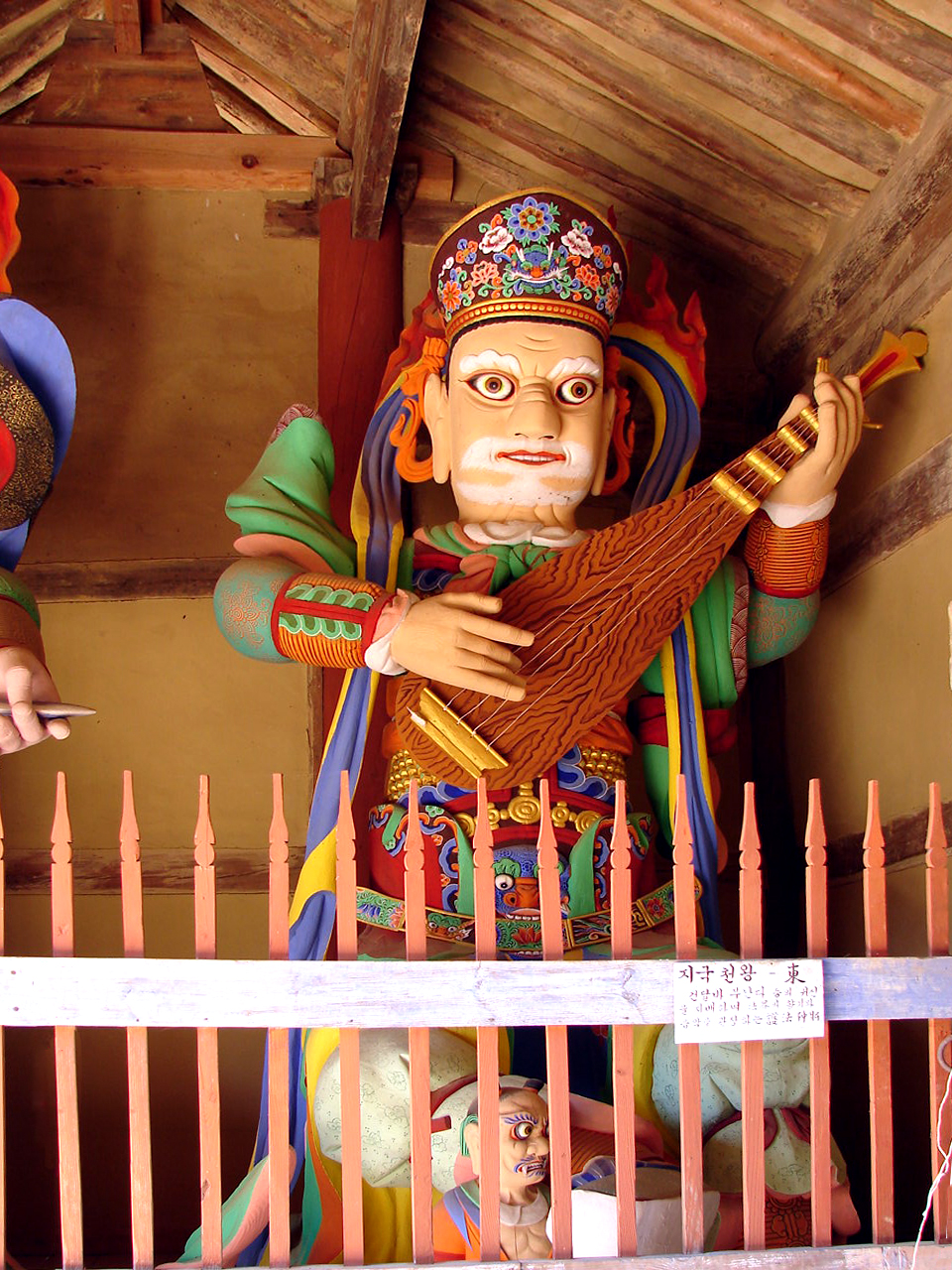

The Wooden Four-Deva Statues of Neunggasa.

Cheongwangmun or Four Guardians gate, traditionally the second gate into the temple, enshrines the Four Heavenly Kings. The Four Heavenly Kings vow to protect the Dharma Truths and all who worship in the temple.

Their ferocious looks reflect their duty to force unruly spirits into submission, or at least focus the minds of temple visitors.

Due to inscriptions found on the ridge beam of gate the statues of the Four Heavenly Kings found here are believed to have been created in 1666.

=== Tangible Cultural Property #264 ===
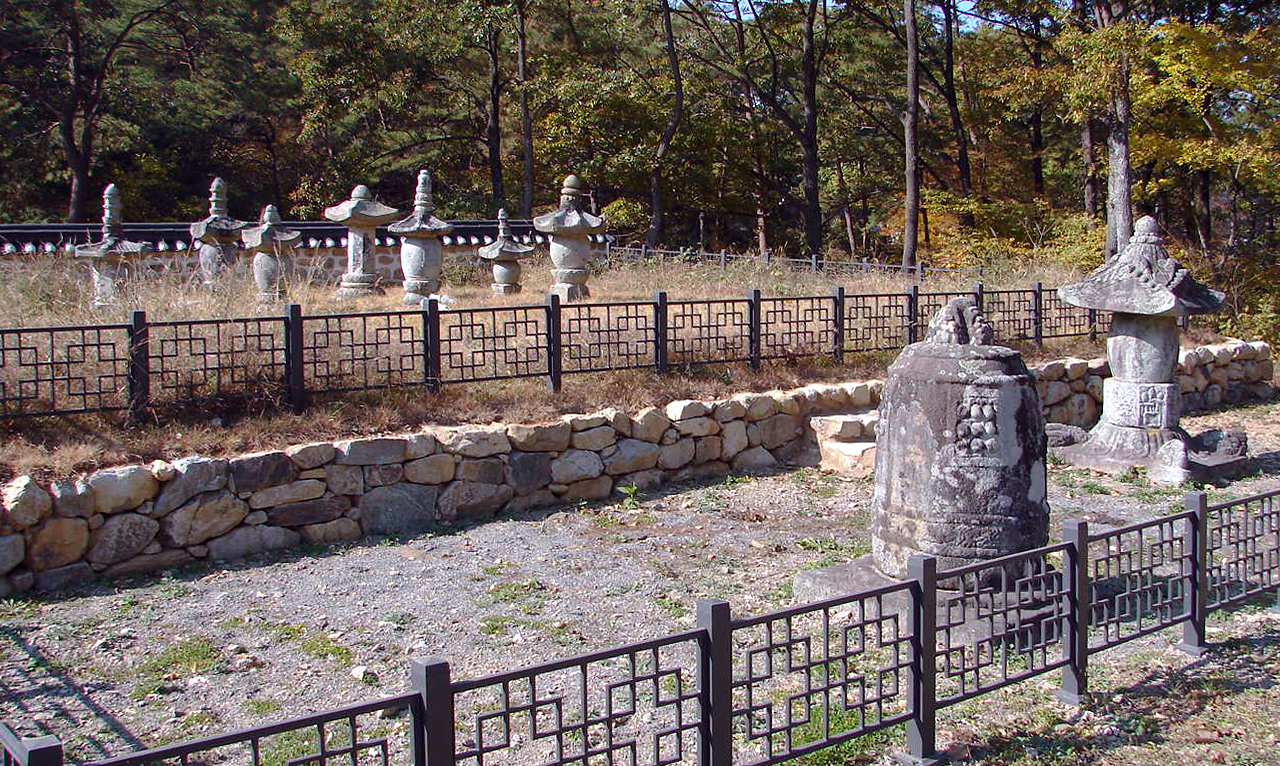

Neunggasa Tomb of Chugyedang and Sayeongdang.

Monks Chugyedang and Sayeongdang were teaching monks, revered by their students, whose ashes are interred in the Neunggasa Tomb of Chugyedang and Sayeongdang.

Each of the tombs differs significantly from the other. The tomb of Chugyedang, on the right, has the appearance of a stone lantern where the tomb of Sayeongdang, to the left, has the appearance of a bronze temple bell.

Both tombs are adorned with engravings of lotus blossoms, a very important symbol in Buddhism, exemplifying the concepts of complete purification of the body, mind and speech, and the blossoming of wholesome acts .

Chugyedang was active during the middle of the 17th century and Sayeongdang active during the late 17th century.

=== Treasure #1307 ===
Neunggasadaeungjeon (Daeng Hall of Neunggasa Temple).

The Hall of Sakyamuni in Neugasa Temple, Daeungjeon, from the Late Joseon Period was rebuilt in the mid 18th century, as a result of being destroyed during the Japanese invasions of Korea (1592–1598).

Neunggasadaeungjeon covers an area of 190 square meters/2045 square feet, comprising five bays, each about 180 cm/5.9 feet wide.

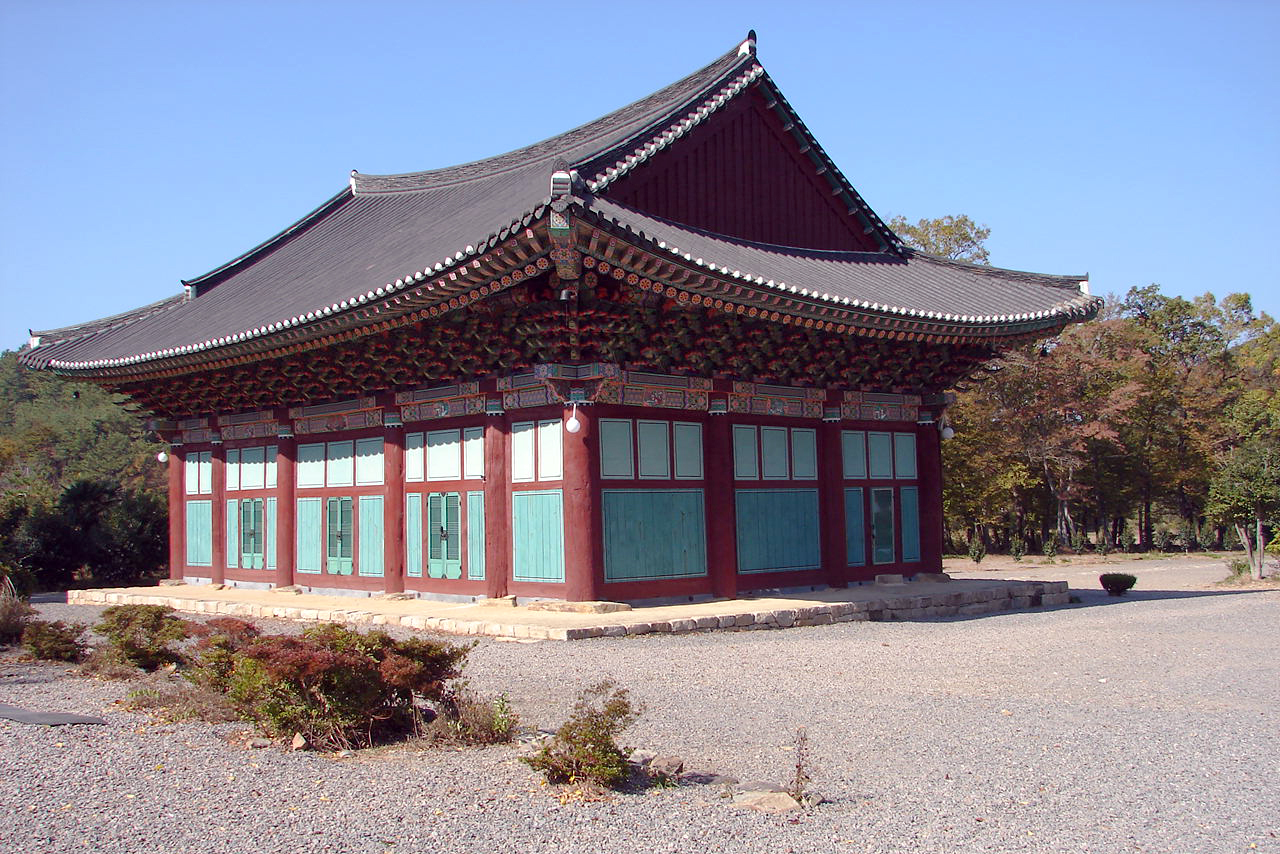

Like other abundantly bracketed buildings, this structure also has a roof-supporting bracket system with three outward arms (oechulmok) and four inward arms (naechulmok). Bracket arms carved in relief on the wall, between the bracket system, is rarely found in temple structures.

Carvings on the column-top blocks (anchogong), and the exquisitely decorated interior employing the lotus-bud designs, are similar to those of the Halls of Sakyamuni in Bulgapsa (Buddhist) temple in Yeonggwang and Gaeamsa (Buddhist temple) in Buan. Both of these halls are designated as national treasures.

Neunggasadaeungjeon has both academical and historical significance, rendering valuable data on the temple construction methods employed during the mid/late Joseon Dynasty in the Jeolla Province(s).

== Gallery ==
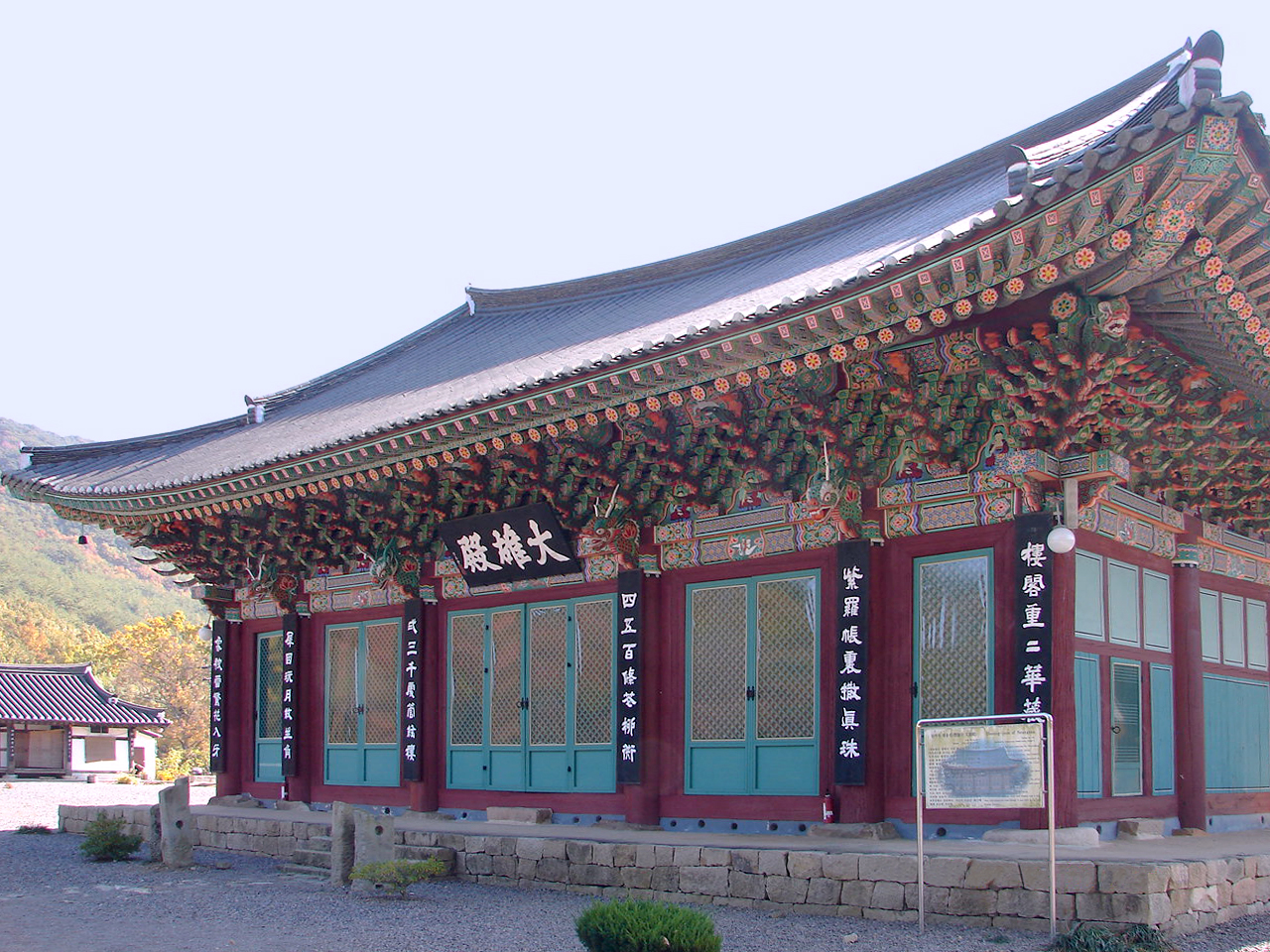
Neunggasa Daeungjeon (Daeung Hall of Neunggasa Temple)

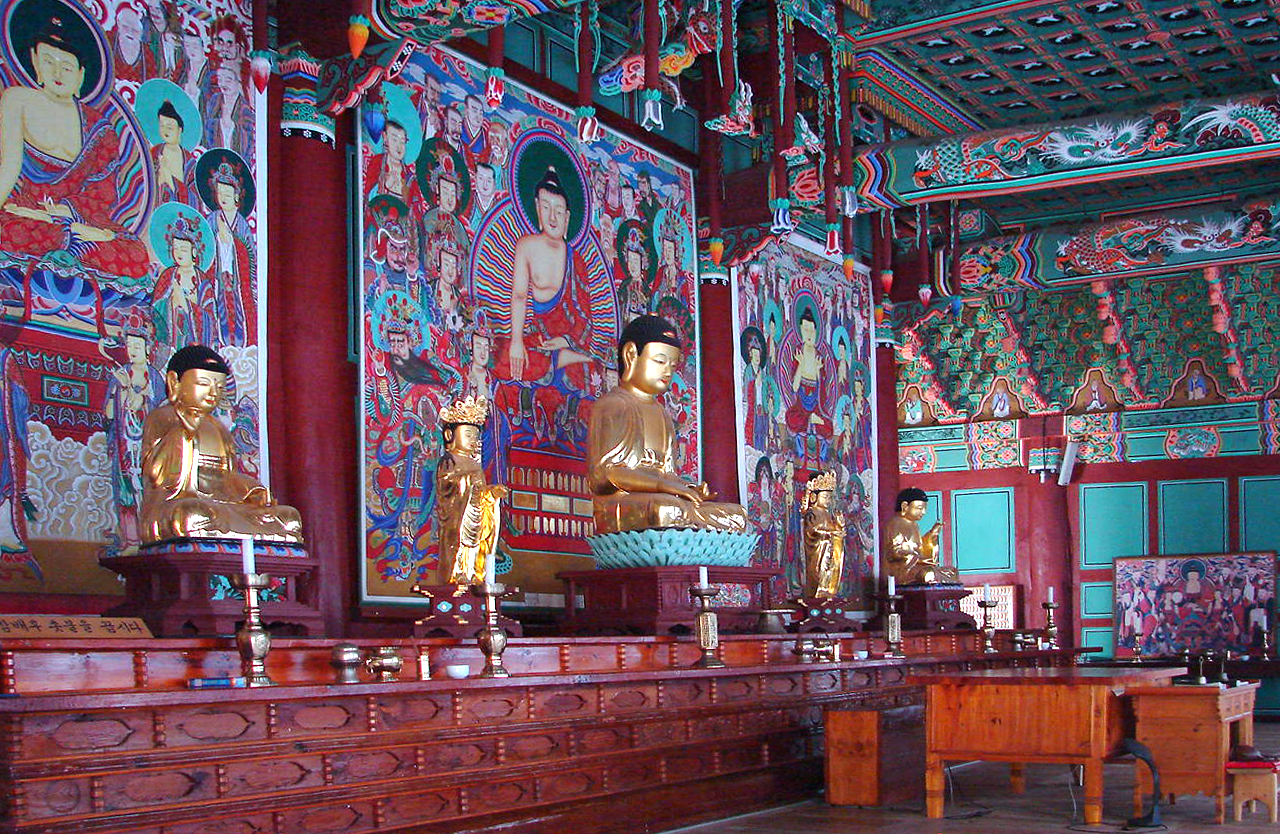
Neunggasa Daeungjeon (Daeung Hall of Neunggasa Temple)

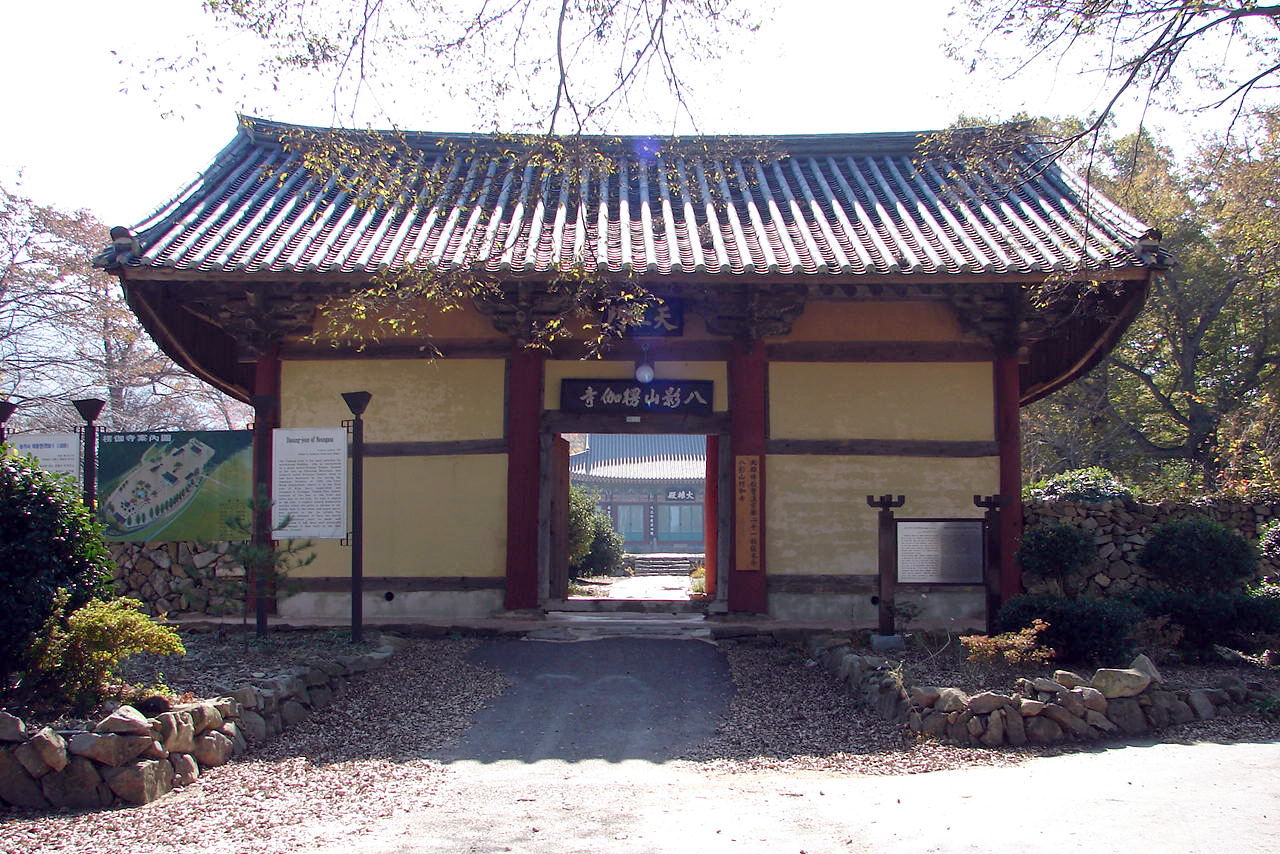
Temple gate housing the Wooden Four-Diva Statues of Neunggasa

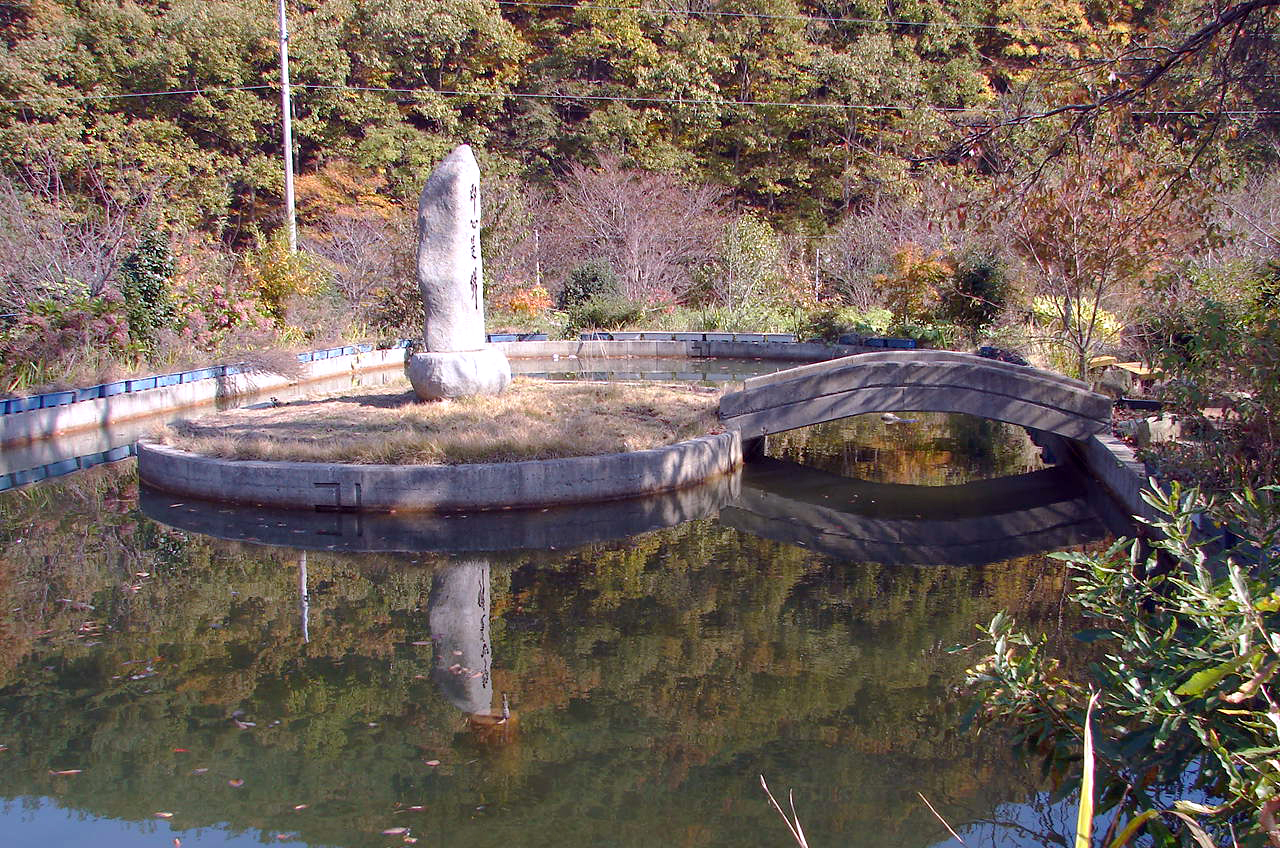
Pond at Neunggasa
