= Ganghwa Hyanggyo =

Pre-modern academy in Ganghwa, South Korea

Ganghwa Hyanggyo (Korean: 강화향교) is a hyanggyo on Ganghwa Island. It was established in Gocheon-ri in 1127, and was relocated several times until it arrived at the present location in 1731.
