= Goheung County =

Goheung
- County
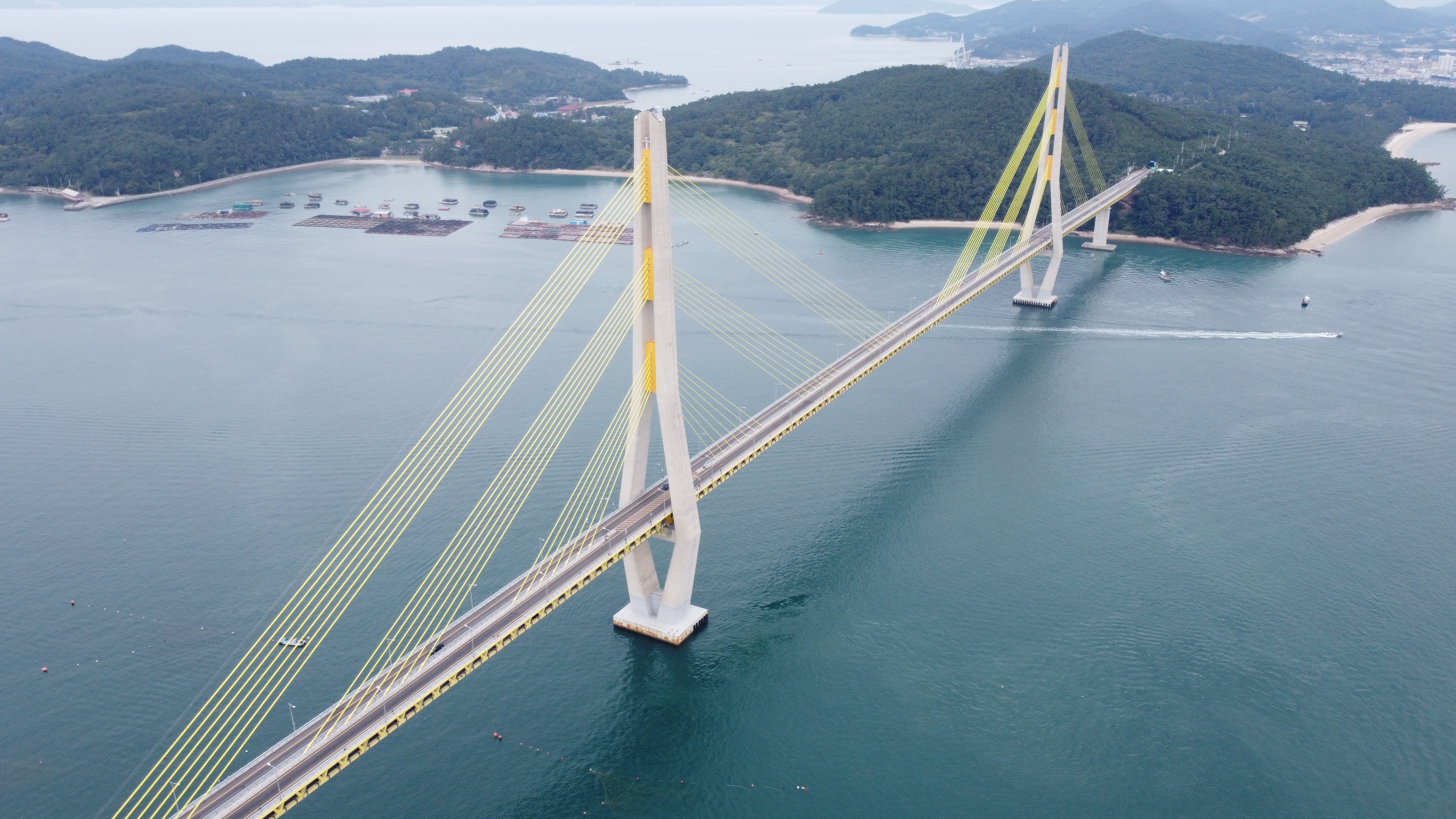
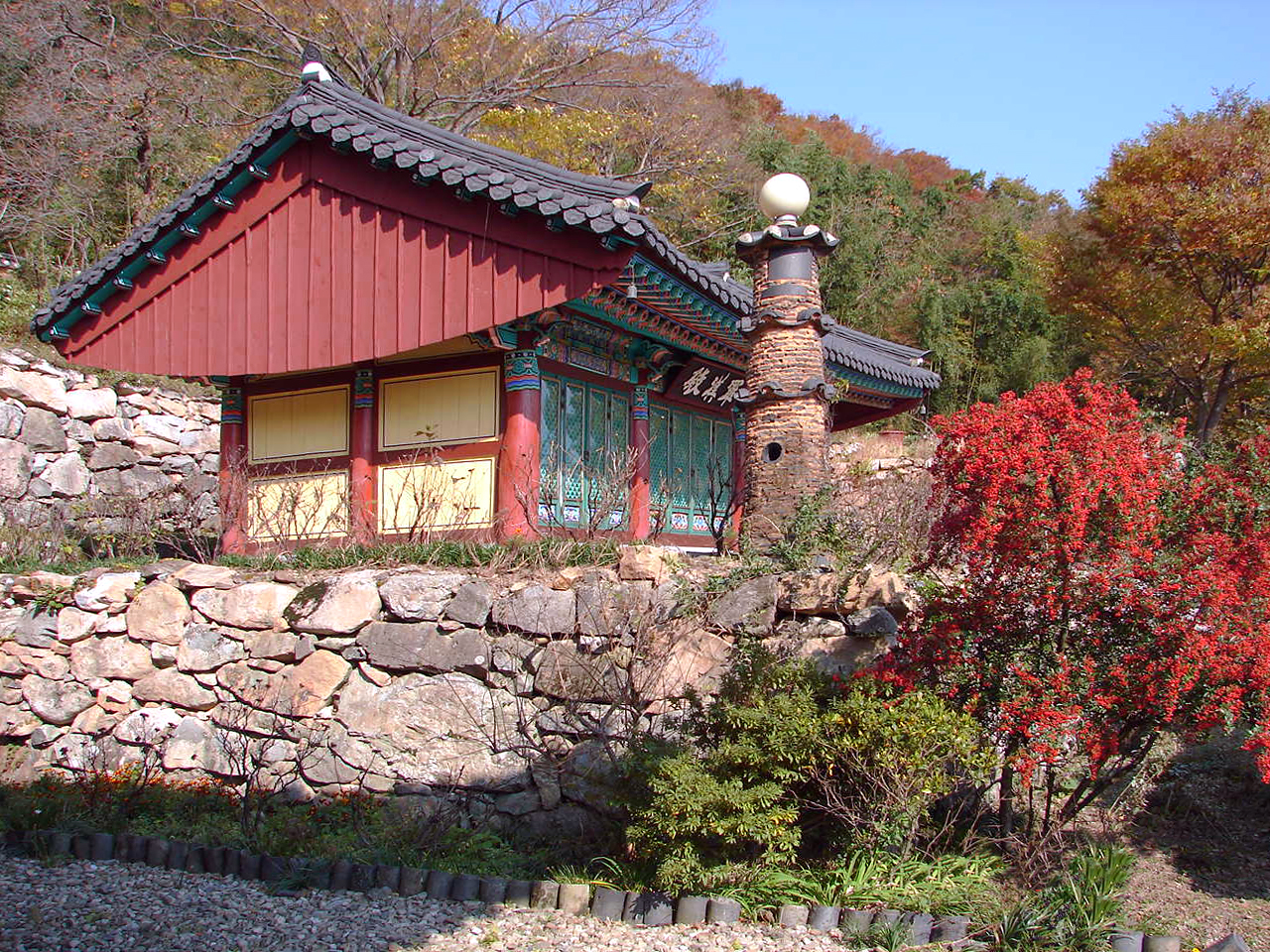
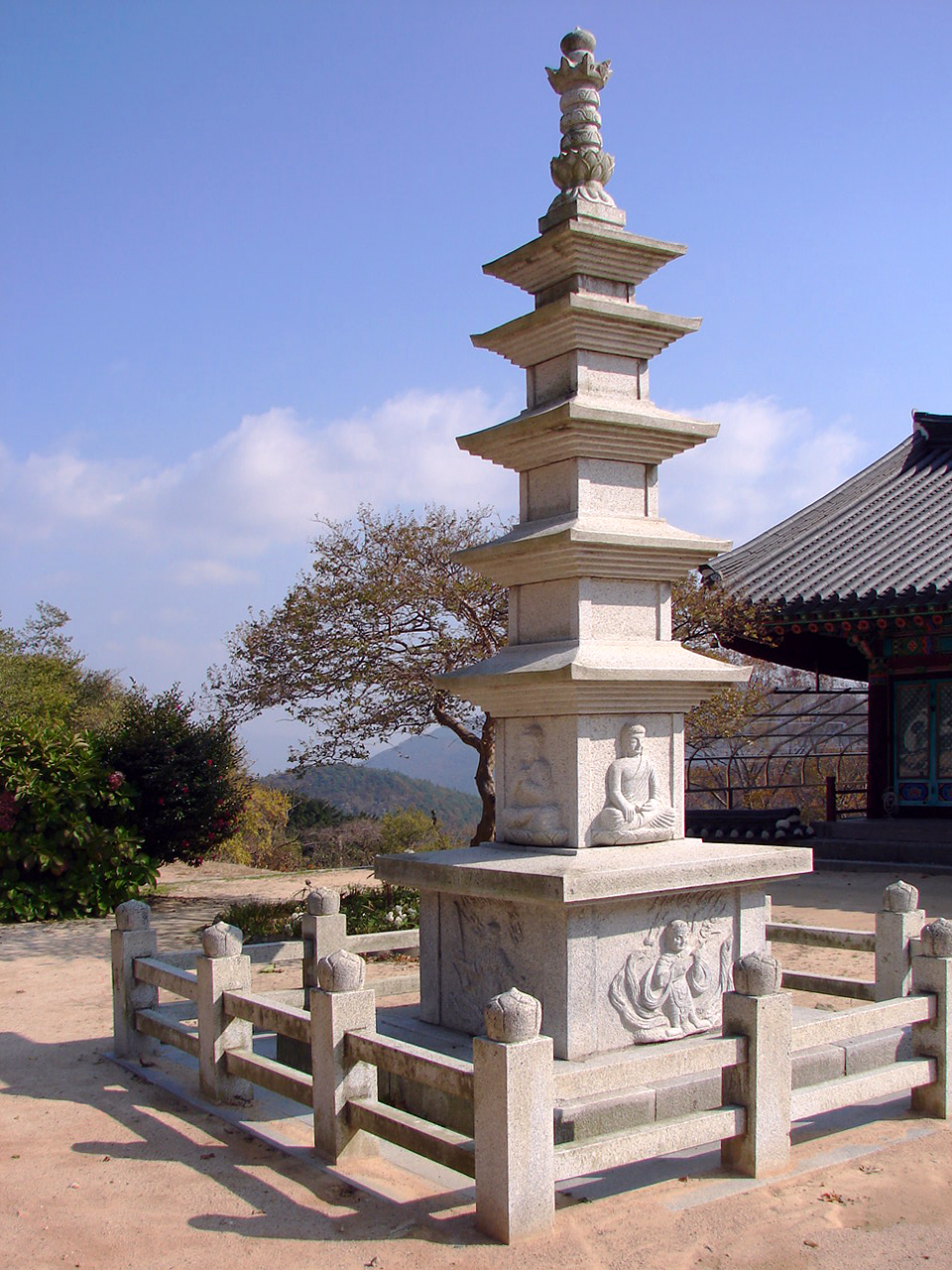

- Flag Emblem of Goheung

- Location in South Korea
- Coordinates: 34°37′N 127°17′E
- Country: South Korea
- Region: Honam
- Provincial-level city: Jeonnam-Gwangju
- Administrative divisions: 2 eup, 14 myeon

Area
  - Total: 775.5 km^{2} (299.4 sq mi)

Population (September 2024)
  - Total: 60,385
  - Density: 90/km^{2} (230/sq mi)
  - Dialect: Jeolla

Korean name
- Hangul: 고흥군
- Hanja: 高興郡
- RR: Goheung-gun
- MR: Kohŭng-gun

Goheung County (Korean: 고흥군) is a county in Jeonnam-Gwangju, South Korea.

== Naro Space Center ==
The Naro Space Center was completed during 2008 in southern Goheung 34.431867°N 127.535069°E and is operated by the state-run Korea Aerospace Research Institute. The space center includes a launch pad, a control tower, rocket assembly and test facilities, facilities for satellite control testing and assembly, a media center, an electric power station, a space experience hall (visitor center) and a landing field.

== Modern history ==
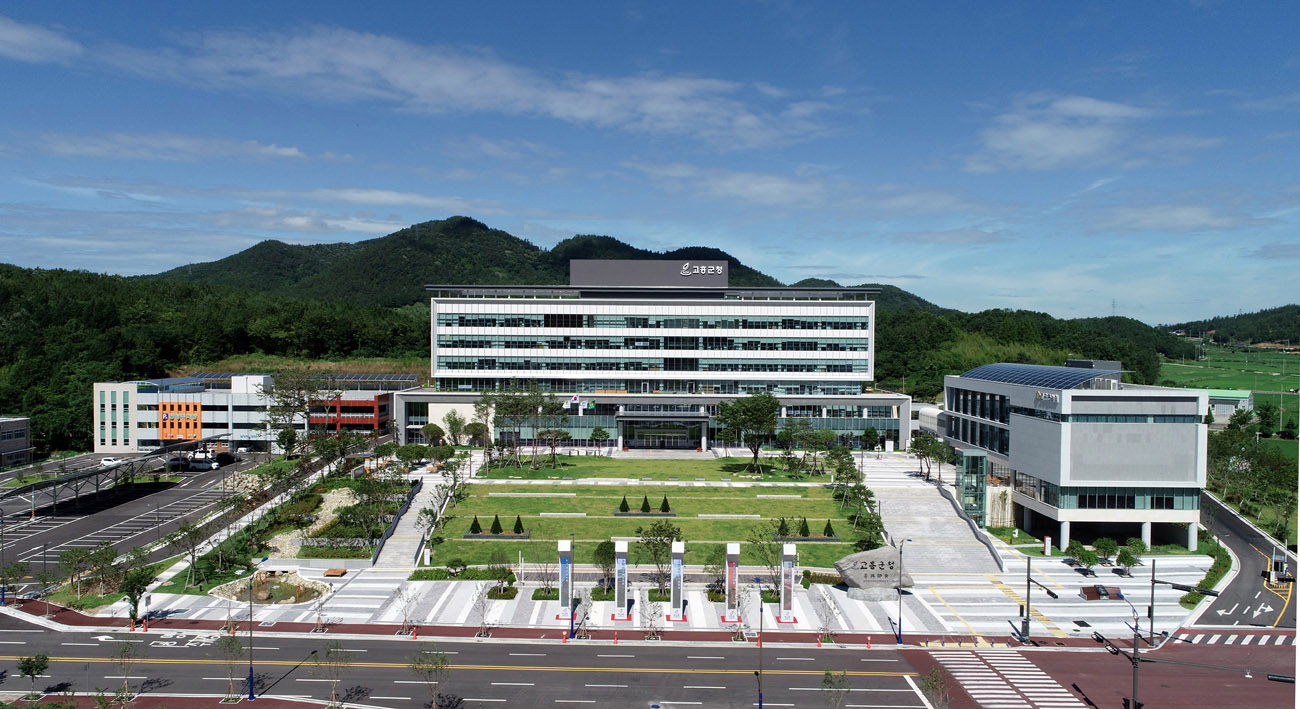
Goheung County Office

On New Year's Day in 1963, some of the townships were classed from Bongrae-myeon to other myeons such as Dohwa-myeon, Podu-myeon and so on. In 1973 and 1979, two of the townships were promoted to eups (towns)

== Symbols ==
- City Tree : Citron tree
- County flower : Camellia blossom
- County bird : Dove

== Location ==
Goheung is located in one of the southernmost areas of the Korean peninsula. It is surrounded by ocean on three sides with 19 inhabited islands and 152 uninhabited islands. The depth is not that low and its land spreads along the coast so many shellfish and seaweed industries have developed.

== Climate ==
Climate data for Goheung (1991–2020 normals, extremes 1972–present)
Month	Jan	Feb	Mar	Apr	May	Jun	Jul	Aug	Sep	Oct	Nov	Dec	Year
Record high °C (°F)	17.8 (64.0)	21.9 (71.4)	23.9 (75.0)	27.8 (82.0)	33.3 (91.9)	34.4 (93.9)	38.5 (101.3)	38.0 (100.4)	35.1 (95.2)	29.9 (85.8)	27.4 (81.3)	21.2 (70.2)	38.5 (101.3)
Mean daily maximum °C (°F)	7.0 (44.6)	9.2 (48.6)	13.5 (56.3)	18.9 (66.0)	23.3 (73.9)	26.0 (78.8)	28.7 (83.7)	30.1 (86.2)	26.8 (80.2)	22.2 (72.0)	15.7 (60.3)	9.3 (48.7)	19.2 (66.6)
Daily mean °C (°F)	1.6 (34.9)	3.2 (37.8)	7.4 (45.3)	12.7 (54.9)	17.4 (63.3)	21.1 (70.0)	24.7 (76.5)	25.7 (78.3)	21.6 (70.9)	15.7 (60.3)	9.4 (48.9)	3.5 (38.3)	13.7 (56.7)
Mean daily minimum °C (°F)	−3.3 (26.1)	−2.3 (27.9)	1.4 (34.5)	6.4 (43.5)	11.7 (53.1)	16.9 (62.4)	21.5 (70.7)	22.2 (72.0)	17.2 (63.0)	9.9 (49.8)	3.6 (38.5)	−1.8 (28.8)	8.6 (47.5)
Record low °C (°F)	−14.4 (6.1)	−12.7 (9.1)	−8.5 (16.7)	−4.4 (24.1)	1.7 (35.1)	8.2 (46.8)	14.1 (57.4)	11.2 (52.2)	6.6 (43.9)	−1.1 (30.0)	−8.1 (17.4)	−10.6 (12.9)	−14.4 (6.1)
Average precipitation mm (inches)	25.9 (1.02)	46.5 (1.83)	86.7 (3.41)	128.2 (5.05)	133.3 (5.25)	186.9 (7.36)	264.9 (10.43)	264.9 (10.43)	167.2 (6.58)	66.8 (2.63)	51.4 (2.02)	26.6 (1.05)	1,449.3 (57.06)
Average precipitation days (≥ 0.1 mm)	4.6	5.2	7.8	8.2	9.0	9.3	12.5	12.0	8.9	4.4	6.3	5.0	93.2
Average snowy days	4.4	3.9	1.0	0.0	0.0	0.0	0.0	0.0	0.0	0.0	0.5	2.9	12.8
Average relative humidity (%)	62.8	61.0	61.8	62.3	66.5	74.2	80.0	77.1	74.3	69.2	68.7	65.4	68.6
Mean monthly sunshine hours	166.3	172.2	200.8	212.9	221.8	169.0	156.1	185.0	173.3	203.1	168.1	167.3	2,195.9
Percentage possible sunshine	55.1	57.3	55.4	57.8	53.8	44.5	41.0	51.0	51.5	63.0	57.7	57.8	53.3
Source: Korea Meteorological Administration (snow and percent sunshine 1981–2010)

== Twin towns – sister cities ==
Goheung is twinned with:

- Geumcheon-gu, South Korea
- Changwon, South Korea

== See also ==
- Geography of South Korea
- Ssangchungsa
- Goheung Hyanggyo
- Neunggasa
