= Goheung Hyanggyo =

Pre-modern academy in Goheung, South Korea

Coordinates: 34.6139°N 127.2807°E

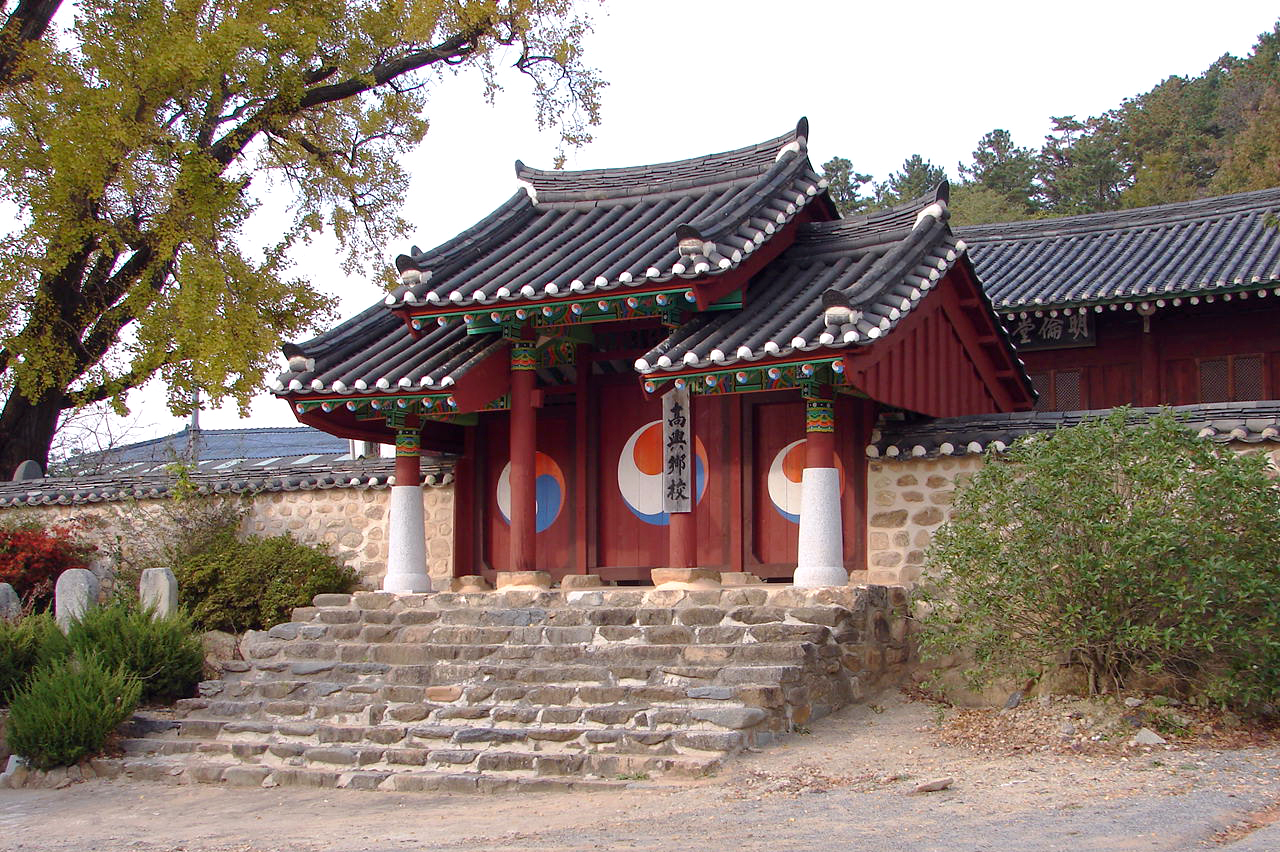
Oesam, outer gate, of the Goheung Hyanggyo

The Goheung Hyanggyo (Korean: 고흥향교; Hanja: 高興鄕校) is a hyanggyo (Confucian school) in Goheung County, South Korea, founded in 1441, during the reign of Joseon Dynasty King Sejong. In 1597 the school was heavily damaged during the Second Japanese Invasion. In 1695 it was moved to the present site and restored with the help of Confucian students from Seongdong town.

The hyanggyo consists of two parts: first, the Myeongnyundang (lecture hall), which contains the Oesam outer gate and the east and west dormitories. The second is the ritual area that includes the Naesam inner gate, Daeseongjeon (Confucian shrine hall), and the east and west Mu. This style of structure forms a Jeonhakhumyo, which means that lecture hall is placed in the front and the ritual hall in the rear. Jeonhakhumyo-type hyanggyos are situated on gently-sloping sites to emphasize the sacredness of the Confucian shrine. Sujik House, next to the Hyanggyo, houses Confucian students.

According to the current curator, the Goheung Hyanggyo was the wealthiest of the Confucian schools during the period just prior to the occupation. During the second occupation, the funds of the Goheung Hyanggyo were confiscated and used to build schools in the area. The occupying Japanese government took credit for building the schools, though the funds used to build the schools were actually those confiscated from the Goheung Hyanggyo.

Rituals are held here every month at dawn; at those times, participants gather in the afternoons and evenings prior, staying overnight in the east dormitory and preparing for the next morning's ceremony. Many other additional activities occur at the Goheung Hyanggyo throughout the year.

== Gallery ==
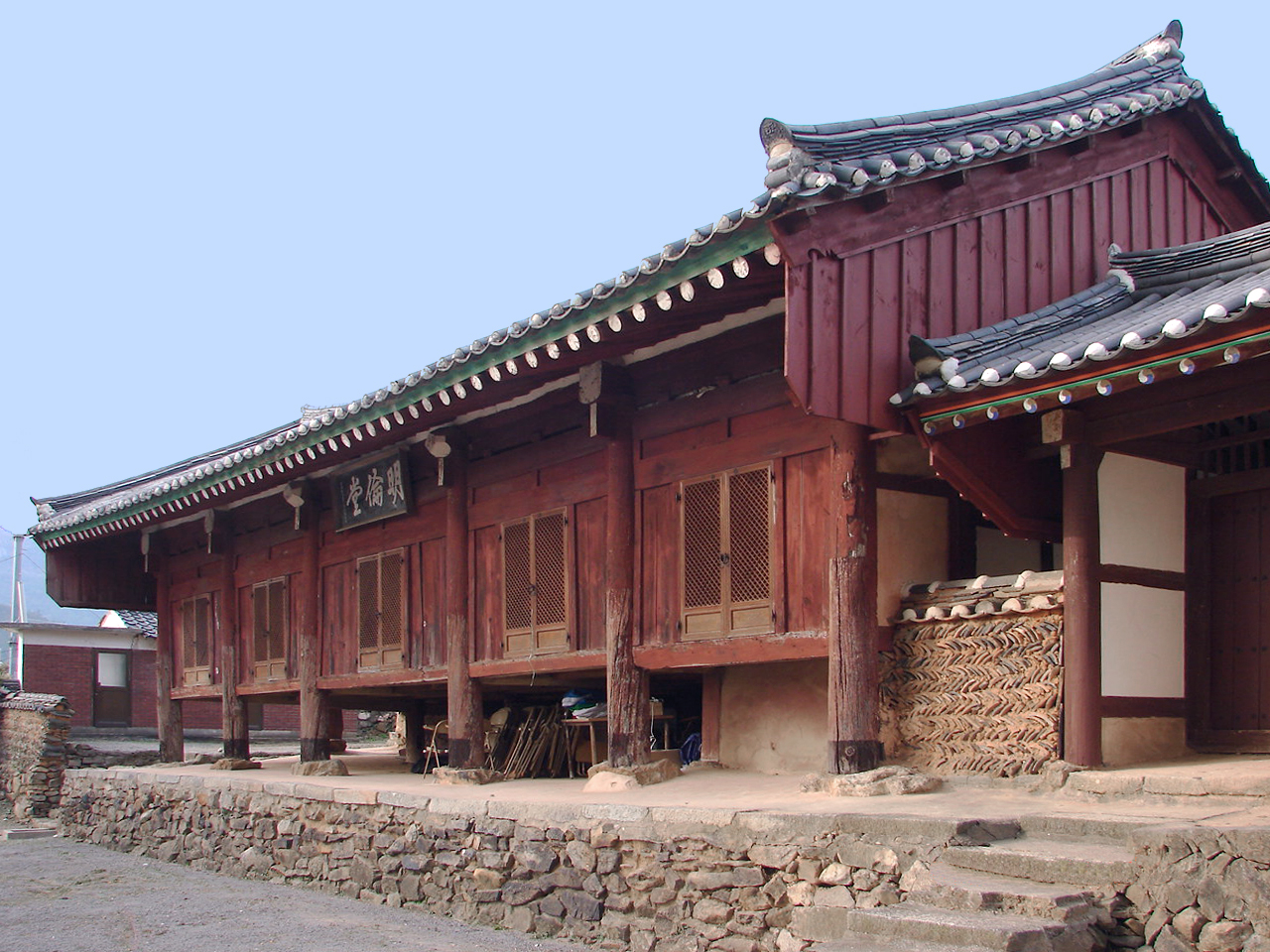
Myeongnyundang - Goheung Hyanggyo Lecture Hall inside the outer courtyard

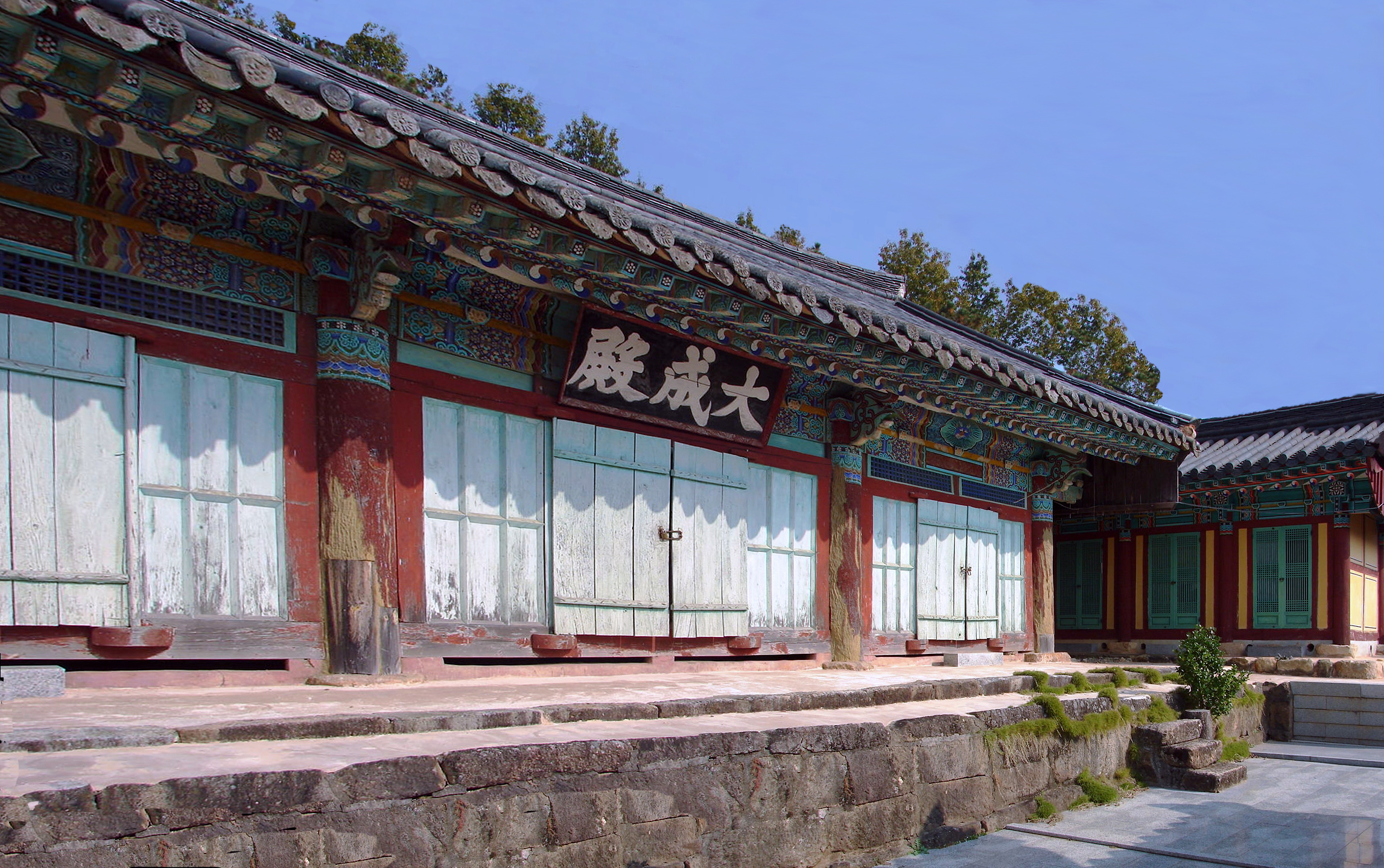
Daeseongjeon - Goheung Hyanggyo Shrine Hall inside the inner courtyard

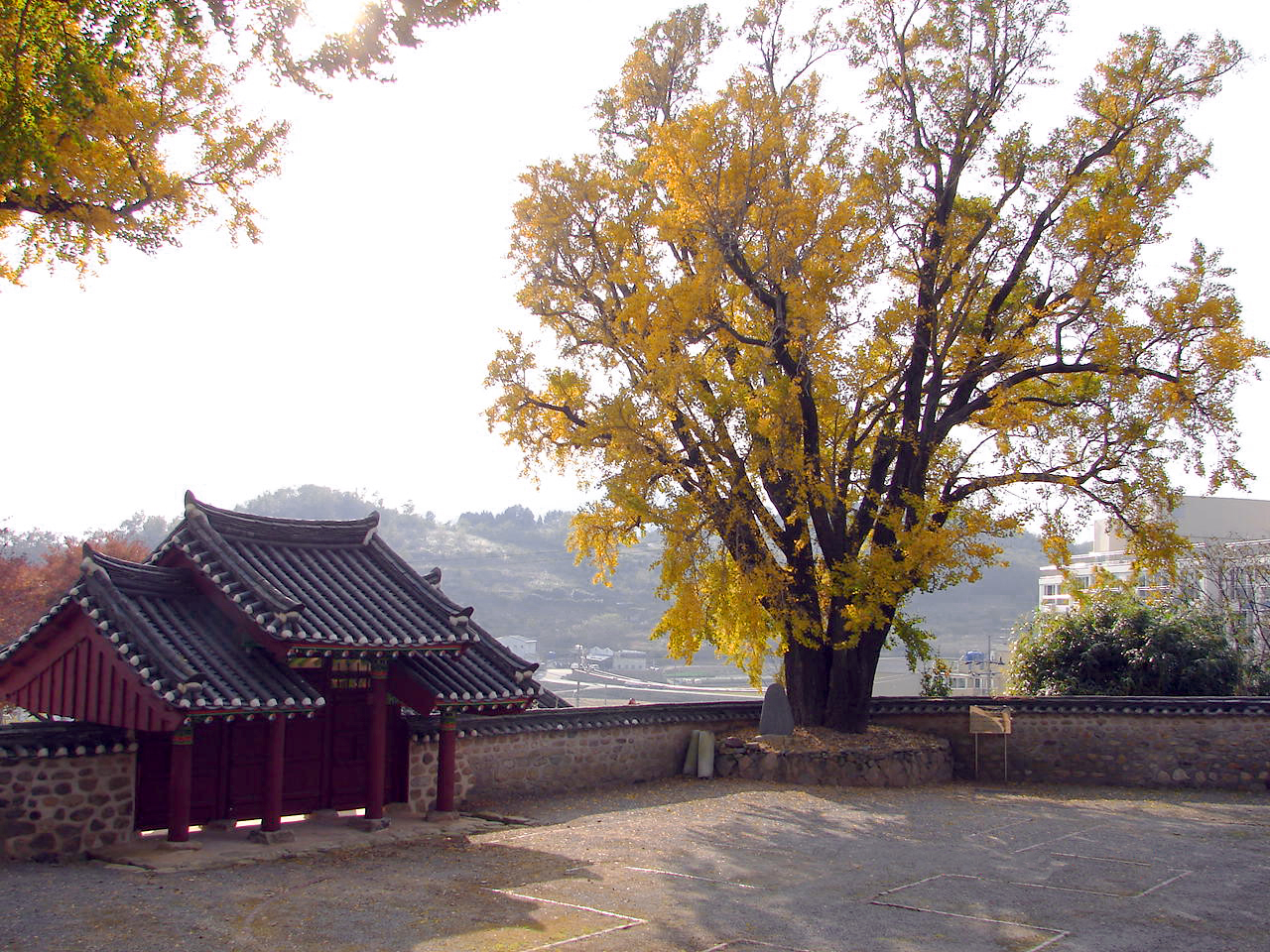
Goheung Hyanggyo outer courtyard showing one of two ginkgo trees in the outer courtyard believed to be 780 years old, and the outer gate from the inside

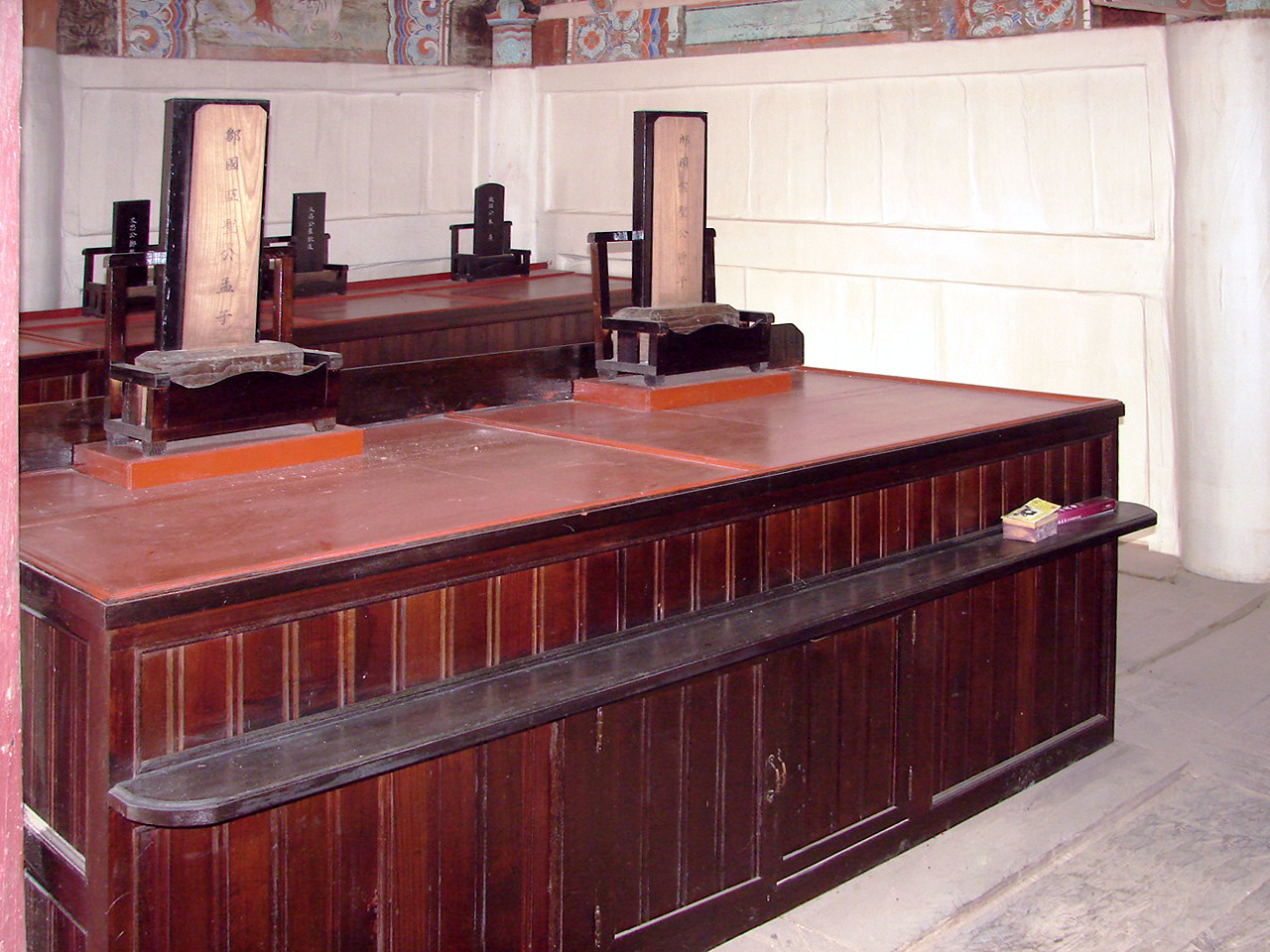
Inside Goheung Hyanggyo Daeseongjeon (shrine hall), showing two of the ancestor tablets uncovered in the foreground (light colored - dark cover placed right behind tablet), with covered (dark colored) tablets in the background
