= List of administrative divisions of Jeonnam-Gwangju =

Jeonnam-Gwangju is divided into 5 cities (si), 5 districts (gu), and 17 counties (gun). These are further divided into 33 towns (eup), 196 townships (myeon), 167 haengjeong-dong, and 394 beopjeong-dong.

== Table ==
Name	Hangul	Hanja	Population (2025)	Area (km^{2})	Population density (2025; /km^{2})
Gwangyang	광양시	光陽市	151,710	464.81	326.39
Mokpo	목포시	木浦市	208,883	51.73	4,037.95
Naju	나주시	羅州市	120,095	608.46	197.38
Suncheon	순천시	順天市	271,415	911.06	297.91
Yeosu	여수시	麗水市	262,133	512.34	511.64
Buk District	북구	北區	428,572	120.26	3,563.71
Dong District	동구	東區	110,816	49.32	2,246.88
Gwangsan District	광산구	光山區	408,705	222.69	1,835.31
Nam District	남구	南區	209,183	60.96	3,431.48
Seo District	서구	西區	274,627	47.73	5,753.76
Boseong County	보성군	寶城郡	36,133	664.69	54.36
Damyang County	담양군	潭陽郡	43,202	455.07	94.93
Gangjin County	강진군	康津郡	30,872	500.88	61.64
Goheung County	고흥군	高興郡	58,771	807.21	72.81
Gokseong County	곡성군	谷城郡	26,105	547.34	47.69
Gurye County	구례군	求禮郡	22,493	442.96	50.78
Haenam County	해남군	海南郡	62,765	1,045.16	60.05
Hampyeong County	함평군	咸平郡	29,013	392.06	74.00
Hwasun County	화순군	和順郡	58,994	787.18	74.94
Jangheung County	장흥군	長興郡	33,310	622.38	53.52
Jangseong County	장성군	長城郡	41,142	518.27	79.38
Jindo County	진도군	珍島郡	29,440	440.11	66.89
Muan County	무안군	務安郡	96,132	451.32	213.00
Sinan County	신안군	新安郡	37,564	656.28	57.24
Wando County	완도군	莞島郡	47,524	396.87	119.75
Yeongam County	영암군	靈巖郡	59,264	612.42	96.77
Yeonggwang County	영광군	靈光郡	51,585	474.52	108.71

== Former ==
Name	Hangul	Romanization	Abolished	Current
Gwangsan County	광산군	Gwangsan-gun	1 Jan 1988	Gwangsan District, Gwangju
Songjeong City	송정시	Songjeong-si	1 Jan 1988	Gwangsan District, Gwangju
Gwangyang County	광양군	Gwangyang-gun	1 Jan 1995	Gwangyang
Donggwangyang City	동광양시	Donggwangyang-si	1 Jan 1995	Gwangyang
Yeocheon County	여천군	Yeocheon-gun	1 Apr 1998	Yeosu
Yeocheon City	여천시	Yeocheon-si	1 Apr 1998	Yeosu
Naju County	나주군	Naju-gun	1 Jan 1995	Naju
Seungju County	승주군	Seungju-gun	1 Jan 1995	Suncheon
Jeju-do, South Jeolla	제주도	Jeju-do	1 Aug 1946	Jeju Special Self-governing Province
Gwangju City, South Jeolla	광주시	Gwangju-si	1 Nov 1986	Gwangju Metropolitan City
Gwangju Metropolitan City	광주광역시	Gwangju-gwangyeoksi	30 Jun 2026	Jeonnam-Gwangju

== See also ==
- List of cities in South Korea
