= Suncheon Bay National Garden =

Large garden in Suncheon, South Korea

Coordinates: 34.928°N 127.506°E

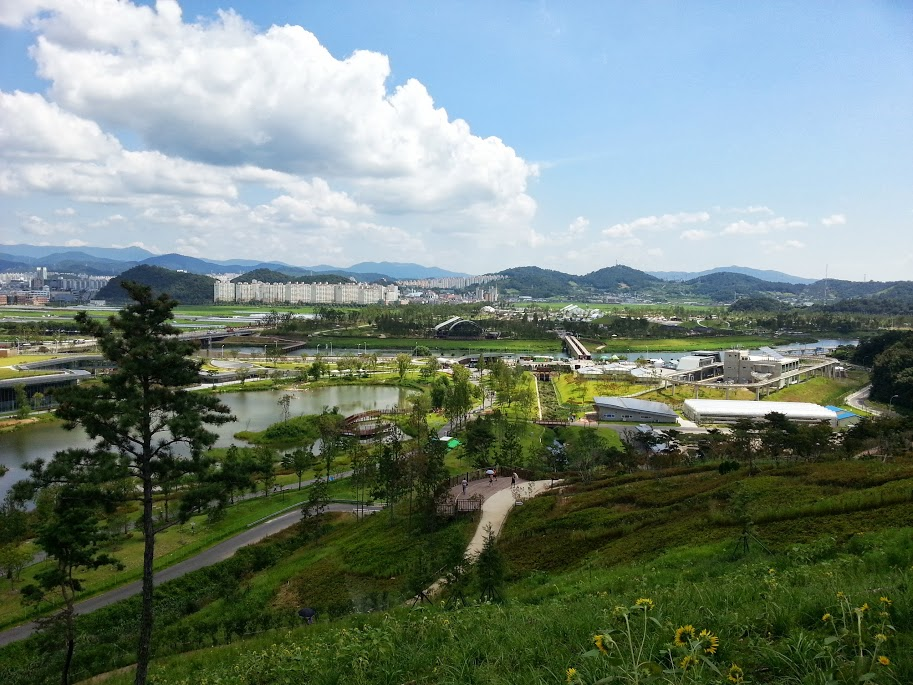
A view of the garden

Suncheon Bay National Garden (Korean: 순천만국가정원; Hanja: 順天灣國家庭園) is located in Suncheon (Suncheon-si) in South Jeolla Province, South Korea. The area of the garden is 1.12 km² plus 28 km² of Suncheon Bay. About 860,000 trees and 650,000 autumn flowers such as roses, sunflowers, and cosmos flowers are planted in the garden. The city opened Suncheon Bay International Garden Expo 2013 from April 20 to October 20, attracting over 4.4 million visitors.

One of the expo officials said that the main purpose of the expo was to preserve Suncheon Bay by building a garden.In 2023, the Suncheon Bay International Garden Fair will be held again for the first time in 10 years. Under the theme of "Garden Together," "Restorative Nature," and "Circular Economy," the fair reveals the aspect of an ecological city throughout Suncheon. The event, which runs for seven months from April 1 to October 31, 2023, is estimated to attract at least 8 million visitors from more than 30 countries.

Suncheon Bay Garden was designated as the No.1 National Garden in August and held a proclamation ceremony on September 5, 2015. According to the data collected from Suncheon on October 13, the total number of visitors to the garden is now at the 400 million mark.

The workshop on how to spread the garden culture and to activate the garden industry was held on November 5 at the Suncheon Bay International Wetland Center. This workshop was co-organized by the Korea Forest Service and Korea Green Promotion Agency.

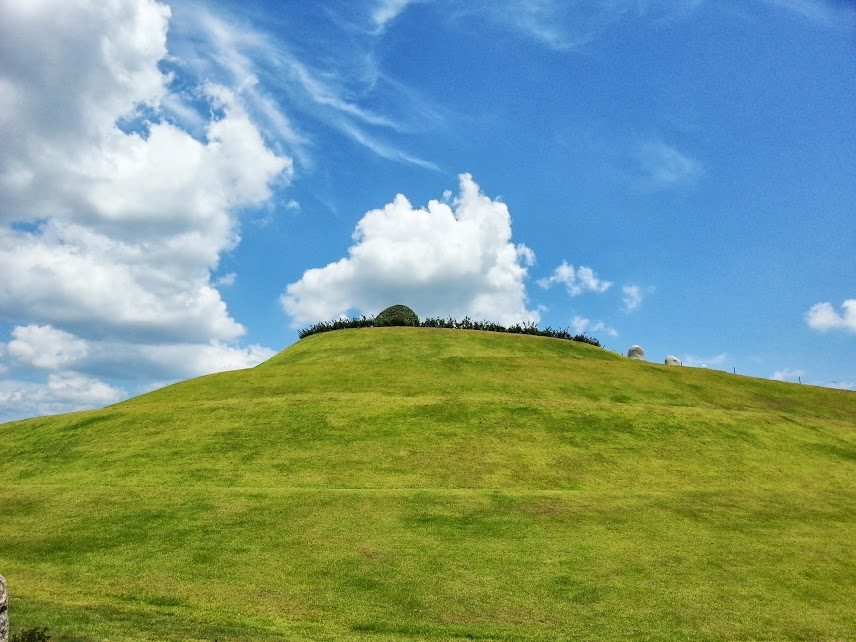
A hill of International Garden Exposition Suncheon Bay

== Description ==
The garden has a number of parts to it.

=== Arboretum ===
The Arboretum zone features various kinds of path including Autumn Tint path, Maple Tree path, and Meditation path. It also features the Korean Traditional Garden where the Palace Garden, the Noblemen's Garden, and the Garden of Hope can be found. The Royal Azalea Garden has locally grown royal azalea trees with over a hundred species of royal azaleas. Another feature of the arboretum is the Tree Ground which has over 200 species of naturally grown trees such as southern magnolia, zelkova, and hackberry tree.

=== Wetland Center ===
The Wetland Center Zone features the Dream Bridge designed by artist Kang Ik-Jung. The wall of the bridge is decorated with 145,000 drawings on an old shipping container by children around the world. It also operates SkyCube which runs between the Expo grounds and Suncheon Bay Ecological Park. The Suncheon Bay International Wetland Center which is one of the main buildings of the Expo is built in the Wetland Center Zone. This center is where visitors can experience activities and learn about the importance of Suncheon Bay. It also features Water Bird's Playground, Wildlife Conservation Park, and ECOGEO Greenhouse.

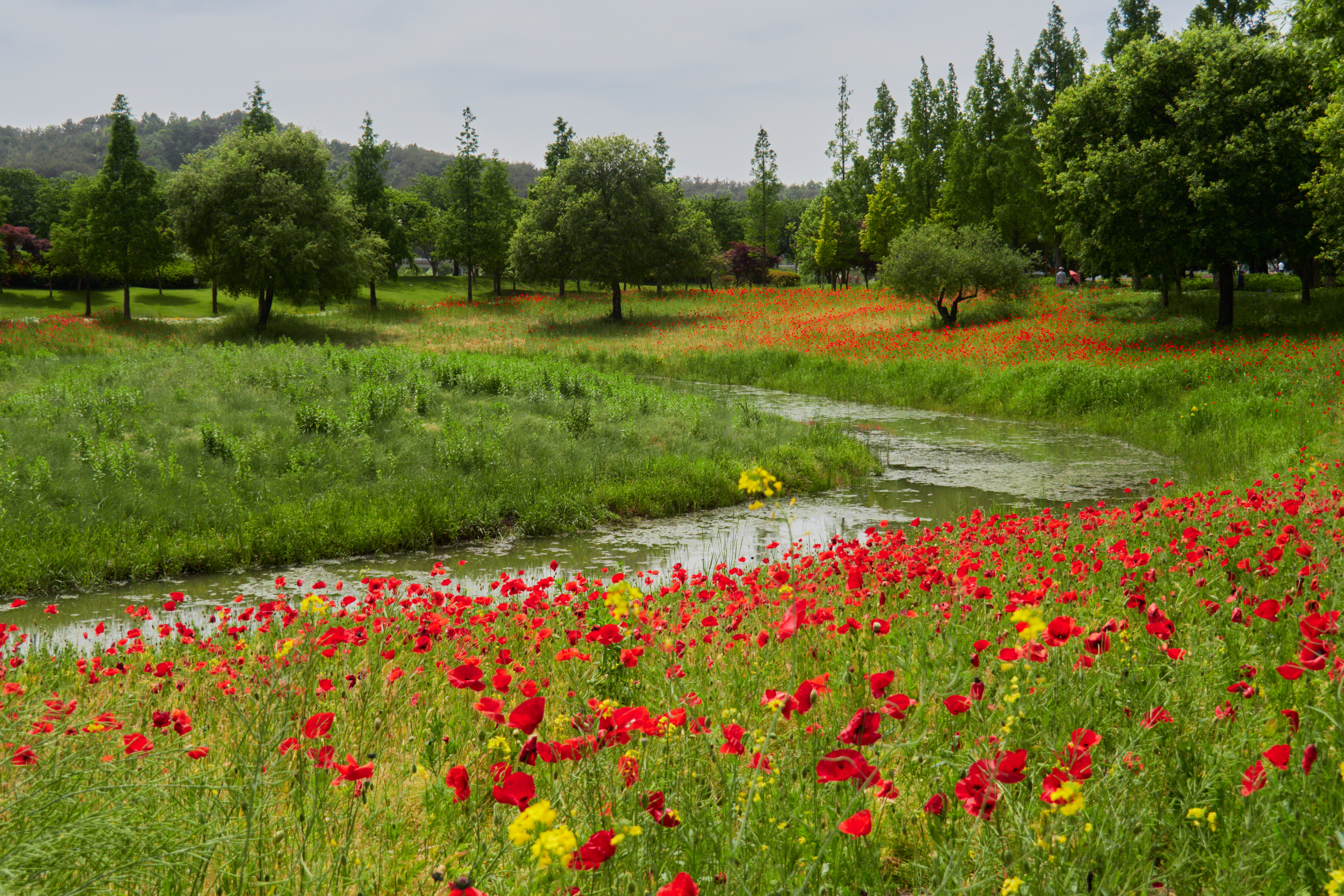
Poppies and wildflowers growing along a winding stream at Suncheon Bay National Garden.

=== World Garden Zone ===
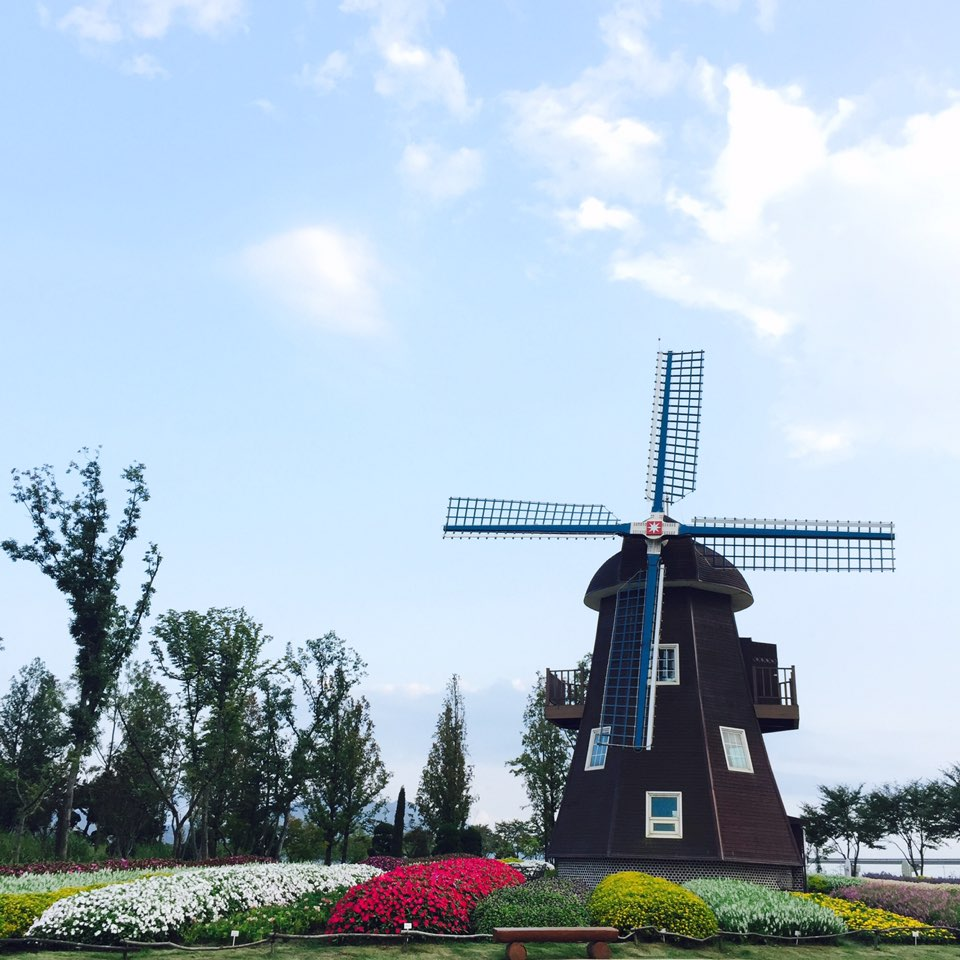
Netherlands Garden

The World Garden Zone is a collaborative space created by designers and artists from Korea and all over the world. It consists of indoor, outdoor gardens, and gardens of 11 countries including German, Dutch, Japanese, and Spanish.

=== Wetland Zone ===
The Wetland Zone is where visitors can experience natural environments. The Biotope Wetland was built to protect the Suncheon Bay wetland ecology. A walking trail work as a guide for visitors to explore ecology of inland wetland. The Kindness Forest is for visitors of all ages, where the smooth pavements make wheelchairs and strollers accessible. The Eco-Training Playground is where visitors can learn about wetlands by examining plants of the wetland and ecology with the help of ecology experts.
