= Daedong Bay Important Bird Area =

Coordinates: 38°35′00″N 125°07′00″E

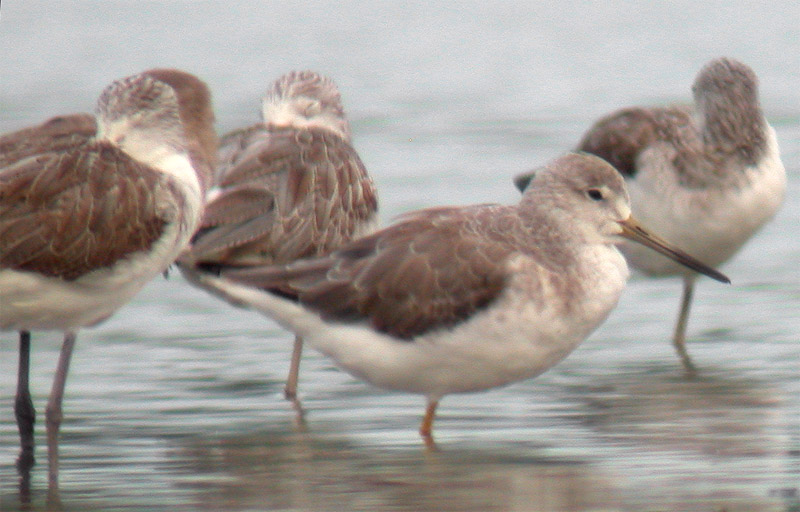
The bay is an important staging site for Nordmann's greenshanks

The Daedong Bay Important Bird Area (대동강변 조류보호구) lies on the north-eastern coast of the Yellow Sea on the west coast of North Korea near the mouth of the Taedong River. It comprises 3,500 ha of marine, intertidal and beach wetlands, encompassing a 2,000 ha protected area. It has been identified by BirdLife International as an Important Bird Area (IBA) because it supports significant populations of various birds, including greater white-fronted geese, Oriental storks, black-faced spoonbills, Chinese egrets, great bustards, hooded cranes, red-crowned cranes, Far Eastern curlews, Nordmann's greenshanks and spoon-billed sandpipers. Threats to the site include agricultural intensification and aquacultural development.
