= Yeocheon =

- City
- Country: South Korea
- Province: South Jeolla Province
- Established: 1 January 1986
- Administrative divisions: 6 HJ dong: not sure BJ dong
- Time zone: UTC+9 (Korea Standard Time)

Korean name
- Hangul: 여천시
- Hanja: 麗川市
- RR: Yeocheon-si
- MR: Yŏch'ŏn-si

Yeocheon (Korean: 여천) was a former si (city) in South Jeolla Province, South Korea.

The city was located in central part of the Yeosu Peninsula, south-eastern part of South Jeolla Province. It was established on 1 January 1986, was split from Yeocheon County (Yeocheon-gun), and it was dissolved on 1 April 1998, was merged to Yeosu City (Yeosu-si). It had seven (7) haengjeongdong, and maybe twenty four (24) beopjeongdong. The former Yeocheon city hall was in Ssangbong-dong by haengjeongdong, Hak-dong by beopjeongdong. It is used to the Yeosu city hall since 1 April 1998.

== Administrative divisions (dong) ==
It had seven haengjeongdong: Myodo-dong, Samil-dong, Sangam-dong, Sijeon-dong, Ssangbong-dong, Yeocheon-dong and Jusam-dong, and maybe twenty four beopjeongdong.

Haengjeongdong		Beopjeongdong		Note
English	Korean	English	Korean	Note
Myodo-dong	묘도동	Myodo-dong	묘도동	
Samil-dong and Sangam-dong	삼일동 and 상암동	Nakpo-dong	낙포동	
Samil-dong and Sangam-dong	삼일동 and 상암동	Sangam-dong	상암동	
Samil-dong and Sangam-dong	삼일동 and 상암동	Sindeok-dong	신덕동	
Samil-dong and Sangam-dong	삼일동 and 상암동	Wolnae-dong	월내동	
Samil-dong and Sangam-dong	삼일동 and 상암동	Wolha-dong	월하동	
Samil-dong and Sangam-dong	삼일동 and 상암동	Jeongnyang-dong	적량동	
Samil-dong and Sangam-dong	삼일동 and 상암동	Jungheung-dong	중흥동	
Samil-dong and Sangam-dong	삼일동 and 상암동	Pyeongyeo-dong	평여동	
Samil-dong and Sangam-dong	삼일동 and 상암동	Homyeong-dong	호명동	
Samil-dong and Sangam-dong	삼일동 and 상암동	Hwachi-dong	화치동	
Sijeon-dong	시전동	Sijeon-dong	시전동	
Sijeon-dong	시전동	Singi-dong	신기동	
Sijeon-dong	시전동	Ungcheon-dong	웅천동	
Ssangbong-dong	쌍봉동	Soho-dong	소호동	
Ssangbong-dong	쌍봉동	Ansan-dong	안산동	
Ssangbong-dong	쌍봉동	Hak-dong	학동	City Hall
Ssangbong-dong	쌍봉동	Hagyong-dong	학용동	
Yeocheon-dong	여천동	Seonwon-dong	선원동	
Yeocheon-dong	여천동	Yeocheon-dong	여천동	
Yeocheon-dong	여천동	Hwajang-dong	화장동	
Jusam-dong	주삼동	Bonggye-dong	봉계동	
Jusam-dong	주삼동	Jusam-dong	주삼동	
Jusam-dong	주삼동	Haesan-dong	해산동	
