= Suncheon Bay Ecological Park =

Park in South Korea

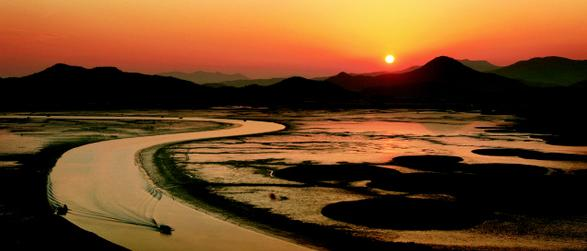
- The view of Suncheon Ecological Park in Suncheon, South Korea.

- Location within South Korea
- Location: Suncheon Bay, South Korea
- Nearest city: Suncheon
- Coordinates: 34°50′34″N 127°30′22″E
- Area: 27 km^{2} (10 sq mi)
- Established: 2003

Suncheon Bay Ecological Park is a protected natural area near Suncheon, South Korea. It is a bay between Yeosu and Goheung peninsulas, located 8 km (5.0 mi) from the center of Suncheon, with 21.6 km^{2} (8.3 sq mi) of mudflats and 5.4 km^{2} (2.1 sq mi) of reed beds.

From the junction of the Dong and Isa streams to the beginning of the mudflat in Suncheon Bay, it has the widest reed bed in Korea. In autumn, reed blossoms, red turkeys, and white migratory birds make the area a popular attraction.

== Climate ==
Suncheon Bay, facing the South Sea, has a climate strongly influenced by the sea. The average temperature of the coldest month is about 0 °C (32 °F). A yearly average temperature is 13.9 °C (57.0 °F). The annual temperature range is smaller than other areas.

Gardening and cultivation advances benefit from the warm temperatures in winter. The area is developing fisheries for gray mullet, gizzard shad and octopus, and an aquaculture industry.

The administrative area of Suncheon Bay is over 75 km^{2} (29 sq mi). The total area of sandbar exposed at the ebb tide is about 12 km^{2} (4.6 sq mi) and the total is 21.6 km^{2} (8.3 sq mi).

== Formation of Suncheon Bay ==
Suncheon Bay is about 8,000 years old. Studies performed by geologists have determined that, after the earth's last glacial epoch, the level of sea increased about 160 m (520 ft). The western area of Korea, called West Sea, turned from land to sea. The Korean peninsula was as it is today. Suncheon Bay consists of brackish water, earth and sand, transported in by the river and accumulated over time by the tide of the sea, forming an extensive sandbar.

== Inhabitants of Suncheon Bay ==
Suncheon Bay is a treasure house of many diverse species, making it an important area of study. Due to little pollution, the area has developed salty swampy land, abounding in fresh marine products, and numerous and varied invertebrate animals and sea plants.

The extensive reedbeds form the wintering site and habitat for rare birds including the hooded crane, sea gull, white stork, black-faced spoonbill and eastern great egret.

== Natural environment of Suncheon Bay ==
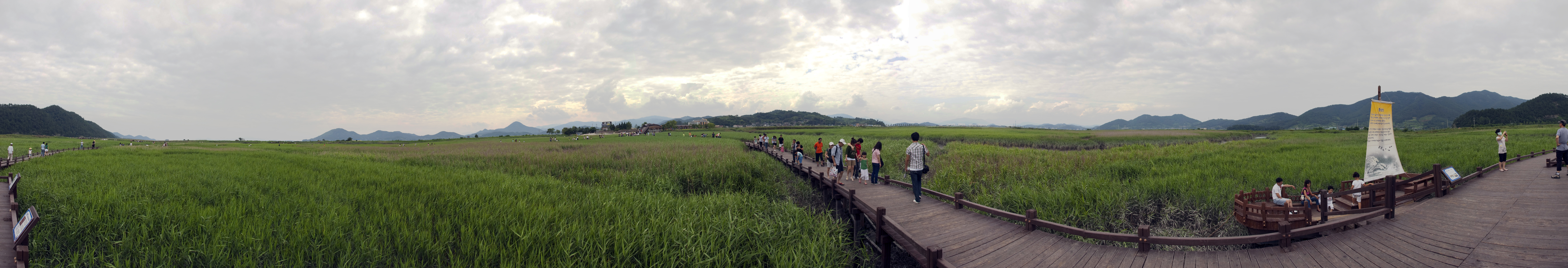
A panoramic view of the reed bed.

=== Swampy land ===
The land frequently called a swamp is the transition region between land and sea. It is also called "the swirl of life" and "the lungs of earth," due to the many lifeforms that live in it.

The swampy area of Suncheon Bay expands into the downstream area at which Dong-cheon and Isa-cheon meet, supplying the swampy land. The speed of the current rises by the increasing slope, and the land extends downstream. The swampy land, unique to Korea, is preserved in view of its natural ecology.

The reedbeds and Suaeda japonica of Suncheon Bay are the main habitat for migratory birds, which attracts tourists.

=== Sandbar ===
The sandbar is unceasingly provided with nutrients from the river and is home to a diverse variety of animals and plants. The productive ecosystem of a sandbar is a habitat on which 20% of creatures on earth live. Suncheon Bay is about 8 million pyeong in size. The depth of the highly developed fine clay layers is about 25 m (82 ft). The sandbar is very productive and fills the role of natural purification and esthetics.

=== Vegetation ===
A total of 116 species, 92 genera, and 36 families of plants inhabit the salty area of Suncheon Bay. A community of Phragmites communis forms the sides of the inner bank, which is also inhabited by zoysia sinica, Kummerowia stipulacea, Rhynchosia volubilis, and other plant life. Within 2 m (6 ft 7 in) of the outer parts of the bank, plants such as Erigeron bonariensis and Echinochloa crus-galli endure the salty environment relatively well.

The Phragmites communis community extends more and more as a dominant species of Suncheon Bay, developing and forming a ring shape in several areas of the reeds. Suaeda asparagoides grows well on the dry ground of the lower part of the bank, and groups of Aster tripolium and Plantago maritima grow well near watercourses or puddles. The Phragmites communis and Suaeda japonica communities grow as dominant species in farmlands and fields.

=== Phragmites communis community ===
The beginning of Suncheon Bay contains a densely spread community of Phragmites communis approximately 300,000 pyeong in size, which is more than 30 years old. This community has been growing more quickly within the past 10 years. Other Phragmites communis communities in Korea have been destroyed, but the community of Suncheon Bay is the widest and most well-preserved.

The Phragmites communis community has an outstanding purifying function and provides a productive environment for Boleophthalmus pectinirostris, which is very sensitive to pollution. It plays a role not only as a natural sanitation facility of Suncheon Bay, but also controls flooding. It blocks the cold wind, which attracts fish, as well as birds that eat these fish. The Phragmites communis community has become a habitat of various species of rare birds.

=== Birds ===
Approximately 158 species of birds inhabit Suncheon Bay, including 15 species of natural monument, six endangered species specified by the Ministry of Environment, 13 species of preserved species, 12 species of IUCN Red List, 16 species of CITES annex, and 15 species in Ramsar Convention.

Of the world's total population, more than 1% of Grus monacha and Larus saundersi, 18% of Tadorna tadorna, and 7% of Çalidris alpina inhabit the Suncheon Bay area. These are international preserved species.

The dominant species are Anas acuta, Tadorna tadorna, Anas platyrhynchos, Aythya marila mariloides, Aythya fuligulaand Anser alvifrons. Scolopacidae, plover such as Calidris alpina, and Charadrius alexandrinus use the Suncheon Bay for their hibernation area.

Other visiting species to the area include Grus vipio, Platalea minor, Ciconia boyciana, Falco tinnunculus interstinctus, Microsarcops cinereus, and Haematopus ostralegus osculans.

=== Benthos ===
Suncheon Bay is home to many marine resources. Inhabitants include various groups of organisms, from a microbes to higher lifeforms, including a total of 43 species of benthos, a community of organisms which live on, in or near the seabed. The density of inhabitation is about 300 individuals per 0.1 m^{2}.

Bivalve mollusks, such as Neanthes japonica, Sinonovacula constricta, Cyclina sinensis, Megangulus venulosus, and glaucinomyachinensis, are widely spread throughout the middle and lower beaches.

== Suncheon Bay Eco-Museum ==
The Suncheon Bay Eco-Museum, created in Haeryong-myeon and Byeolang-myeon, Dosa-dong, Suncheon-si is composed of Ecology Hall in the central facility zone, Yongsan Observatory overlooking Suncheon Bay, and small parks with the hem of Unmyong and Waon.

The Eco-Museum created in the central facility zone contains organized Phragmites communis, beaches and birds. It preserves various ecological resources and encourages academic research of resources and the ecological study by students and the general population. Indoor facilities include a plan exhibition room, main exhibition room, movie room, ecology classroom and seminar room. Outdoor facilities include the beach experience course nearby that can be used as an ecology study course for students and the general population, in addition to overview and sunset over Suncheon Bay.

== Biology of Suncheon Bay ==
=== Shelter for passage birds ===
The natural ecological value of Suncheon Bay is represented by the habitation of migratory or passage birds, a measure of the productivity value of the swamp. Numenius madagascariensis, or Far Eastern curlew, loses half of its weight during its migratory flight 4,000–5,000 km (2,500–3,100 mi) non-stop from Australia. It recovers while staying at Suncheon Bay for two weeks before flying on to Siberia. It visits the Suncheon Bay area for its rich food supply. The area's wide Suaeda japonica community and Phragmites communis community becomes a shelf providing a supply of food. The birds also catch food in the nearby field.

==== Winter passage birds ====
Winter passage birds that make a stopover in Suncheon Bay include Grus monacha, Anser albifrons, Tadorna tadorna, Anas penelope linnaeusm, Anas crecca, Anas platyrhynchos, Anas acuta, Mergus serrator, Mergus mergansercircus cyaneus, Coturnix coturnix, Antigone vipio, Vanellus vanellus, Calidris alpina, Numenius arquata, Larus saundersi, Larus ridibundus, Larus argentatus, Motacilla grandis, Prunella nontanella badia, Motacilla grandis and Turdus eunomus.

==== Summer passage birds ====
Summer passage birds of the Suncheon Bay area include Nycticorax nycticorax, Ardea coromandus, Egretta garzetta, Egretta alba modesta, Ardea cinerea, Charadrius dubius curonicus, Alcedo atthis bengalensis, Motacilla cinerea robusta, Motacilla alba and Acrocephalus arundinaceus.

==== Spring and fall passage birds ====
Of the spring and fall passage birds to Suncheon Bay, approximately 15,000 crane plovers pass through annually. There are 10 species that comprise 1% or more of Ramsar Convention joining requirements: Pluvialis squatarola (1%), Calidris alpina(7%), Numenius phaeopus (1%), Tringa nebularia (1%), Tringa guttifer (2%), Xenus cinereus (3%), Tringa brevipes (1%), Limosa lapponica (1%), Numenius arquata (2%), and Charadrius alexandrinus (1%).

=== Beach ===
The north-to-south coast of Korea follows a rough line. Because of its geological feature forming a long gulf, the tide range is very large, which forms a long beach. This beach of Korea is one of the top five longest beaches, along with the eastern coast of Canada, eastern and northern coasts of North America, and the Amazon River area.

The beach of Suncheon Bay is approximately 3,000 years old, with and approximately 8 million pyeong of preserved natural areas providing a habitat for various creatures. It is an internationally preserved habitat for rare passage birds. The beach, a neutral zone connecting land and sea, provides a habitat and spawning grounds for various fish and shellfish. More than 60% of the total fish catch for the area is produced from beach, and one third of creatures facing extermination are known to inhabit the beach.

Various species, including 230 species of fish, 193 species of crab, 74 species of shrimp and 58 species of shellfish live in the beach habitat. The variety of creatures inhabiting this area is due to the rich nutrient salt, which provides high productivity. According to Nature, a science magazine published in England, the ecological value of the beach is US$9,990 per 1§μ(0.01§'). It shows a higher value than farmland, which has an ecological value of US$92. It is an ecologic value of centuple.

The Ministry of Environment of Korea evaluates the ecological value of the Korean beach as US$24.315, because Korean beach is a habitat for creatures where marine goods are produced, which is a higher value compared to foreign nations. The beach of Suncheon Bay has been evaluated to have productivity converse to the economic value of approximately 24,500,000,000 won annually.

=== Reeds ===
The total area of the Phragmites communis field in Suncheon Bay is approximately 300,000 pyeong. It covers over Gyoryang-dong, Daedae-dong and Junghueng-ri, Haechang-ri, Seonhak-ri and Haeryong-myeon of Suncheon-si.

Each side of the 3.5 km (2.2 mi) long watercourse joining Dongcheon and Isacheon to the rivermouth is completely covered with a field of Phragmites communis, the biggest Phragmites communis community in Korea. Its balls of seeds turn silver in the sunlight. The Phragmites communis field is both a habitat for marine creatures and a key to the maintenance of the swamp ecosystem.

Suncheon Bay maintains its clean ecosystem with the help of the large community of Phragmites communis of 300,000 pyeong. The root of Phragmites communis accelerates the growth of bacteria, which filters and absorbs solids. The stem and leaves of Phragmites communis obstruct the growth of seaweed and slows down the wind on the water's surface. It transmits oxygen from the atmosphere into water to the submerged parts of the plants, heightening the quantity of oxygen necessary to dissolve organic matters in the water to purify and improve the water quality. Oxygen discharged from the roots of Phragmites communis oxidizes soil in a resolving state, and promotes the activation and dissolution of nearby microorganisms. The wide Phragmites communis field provides an environment for the microorganism group to inhabit so that it dissolves and disperses various types of polluting substances.

=== Ramsar Convention ===
The swampy area of Suncheon Bay Ecological Park is the most productive life supporting ecosystem in the area. The protection of it is very important for biological, hydrological, and economic reasons. In many areas around the world, swamps are damaged due to factors including irrigation, reclamation and pollution.

To stop the damage to swamps, international and technological conferences sponsored by the International Waterfowl & Wetlands Research Bureau (IWRB) were conducted in 1960. As the result of conferences, a convention was joined in Ramsar, Iran on February 2, 1971. The establishment of the Ramsar Convention helped establish a convention on wetlands of international importance especially as waterfowl habitats. Korea joined this convention on July 28, 1997, as the 101st member. Young Swamp of Daeam Mountain in Inje-gun, Gangwon-do and Upo Swamp in Changnyeong-gun, Gyeongnam are registered as Ramsar Swamps.

Suncheon Bay began to gain attention for its waterfowl population and enlisted into the Ramsar Convention. It satisfies the "various kinds of birds requiring different types of habitat inhabiting" part of the Ramsar Conventions, making Suncheon Bay strong candidate to become a Ramsar Swamp. Suncheon Bay was designated as a swamp preserving area of Korea in December 2003, and it joined the international network for protection of the crane in northeastern Asia in 2004. The Northeastern Crane Network was organized as a protection strategy of Asian and Pacific passage birds at the 6th Ramsar Convention conference in 1996.

The Ministry of Maritime Affairs and Fisheries of Korea will request registration of Suncheon Bay as a Ramsar swamp in August or September 2013. If it becomes a Ramsar swamp, the natural environment of Suncheon Bay and its ecosystem will be better preserved.

== Suncheon International Wetlands Center ==
Suncheon Bay is one of the fifth-largest tidal flats in the world, an international wetland that attracted approximately 2.8 million visitors in 2008. The methodology for the design of the Suncheon International Wetlands Center began with the concept of leading visitors through the wetlands to the Suncheon Bay. The imprint of the receding tide water becomes the concept for this design.

The visitor center is placed at the northeast corner of the site, identified with meandering pathways which encourage and direct visitors to experience the wetlands and outdoor exhibits. The design of these pathways allows visitors to experience the topographical change of the site from forest to wetland. The placement of the building maximizes both the picturesque views to the mountains beyond and to the river, creating a visual continuation of both the water's path and visitor's circulation.

The buildings and pathways are designed to minimally affect the natural order of the protected wetland. Recesses in the pathways around the building allow for the wetland to continue under the structures. Building functions are separated into distinctly different envelops to allow for greater climatic control and lessen the overall energy usage. The green roof continues the language of the mountains beyond, allowing the gallery interior unobstructed views of nature. The wooden façade is intended to minimize summer sun exposure, maximize potential winter daylight and blend in with the surrounding woodland to the north. Framed views from the gallery through these wooden slats capture light and help set the mood for the visitor center.

Providing connectivity to the 2013 Garden Expo, and the greater city of Suncheon, this design intends to reconnect visitors to nature and a network of facilities designed to teach them about wetland preservation.
