= Panmun Field =

Wetland in North Korea

Coordinates: 37°50′00″N 126°37′00″E

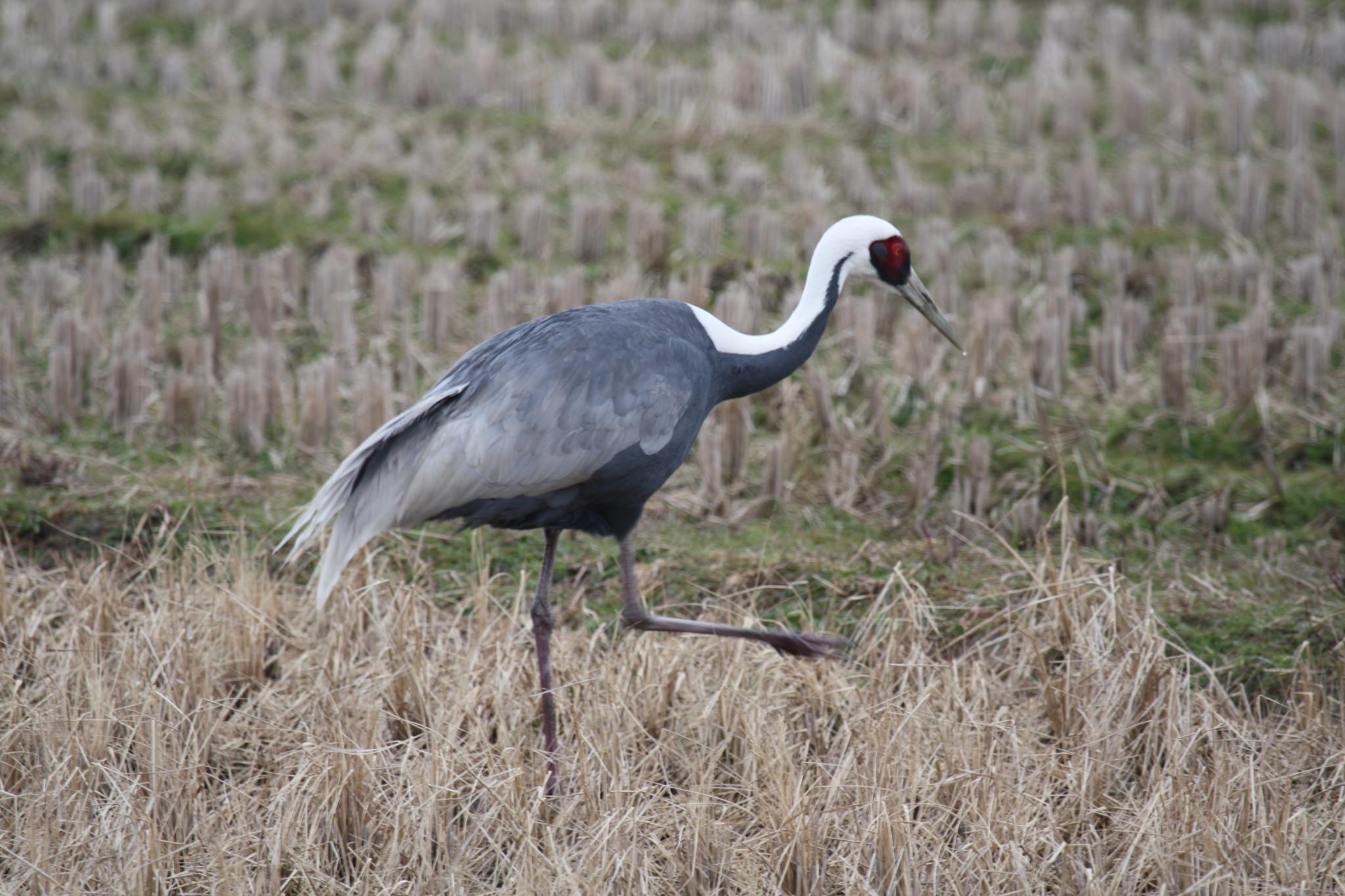
The site is important for wintering white-naped cranes

Panmun Field(판문흰두루미살이터) is an 8000 ha wetland site in southern North Hwanghae Province of North Korea, close to the city of Kaesong and the border with South Korea. It contains mainly rice paddies. It has been identified by BirdLife International as an Important Bird Area (IBA) because it supports populations of swan geese, greater white-fronted geese, white-naped cranes, hooded cranes and red-crowned cranes. It is threatened by human disturbance.
