= IGoBart =

Dutch YouTuber in South Korea

iGoBart
- Born: Bart van Genugten c. 1993; Netherlands

YouTube information
- Channel: iGoBart
- Genres: Travel, history of Korea
- Subscribers: 220,000
- Views: 34.6 million
- Last updated: August 2024
- Website: www.igobart.com

Bart van Genugten (born c. 1993) is a Dutch YouTuber in South Korea that operates the channel iGoBart.

Van Genugten was born in the Netherlands. He obtained a master's degree in human geography and worked as a program director for Yemen in the NGO CARE International. He first moved to South Korea in 2017, after backpacking in East and Southeast Asia for six months. He became interested in producing videos about Korea after seeing other travel vloggers cover the same few mainstream details about Korea, without going into further depth. A number of his early videos are about the relationship of him and his South Korean then-girlfriend. Van Genugten visited North Korea in 2018, and biked 2,000 km (1,200 mi) around South Korea in 2021. He also created a number of videos that featured Dutch veterans of the Korean War and about 17th-century Dutch mariner in Korea Hendrick Hamel. In September 2022, he started the "Welcome to My Dong" series, in which he visits each dong (administrative district, similar to a neighborhood) of Seoul, and gives an introduction of the area and its history. There are 467 dong in Seoul, and van Genugten created videos for 61 of them by December 2023. In a video covering Seongbuk-dong, he interviewed Dutch ambassador to Korea Peter van der Vliet. In 2023, he published a Korean-language book of his travel experience in North Korea.

In 2022, he received a Global Influencer Award from the National Assembly of South Korea. He married his Korean wife in 2019.
