= Suncheon Hyocheon High School =

School in Suncheon, South Korea

- Hangul: 순천효천고등학교
- Hanja: 順天曉泉高等學校
- RR: Suncheon Hyocheon godeunghakgyo
- MR: Sunch'ŏn Hyoch'ŏn kodŭnghakkyo

Suncheon Hyocheon High School (Korean: 순천효천고등학교) is a private high school located in Daeryong-dong, Suncheon-si, Jeollanam-do, Republic of Korea.

== Notable alumni ==
- Kim Kyung-Ho: Korean rock singer known for his efforts in bringing rock music to South Korea

== See also ==
- Education in South Korea
