= Naganeupseong =

South Korean historic village

Naganeupseong Folk Village
- 낙안읍성 (Korean)
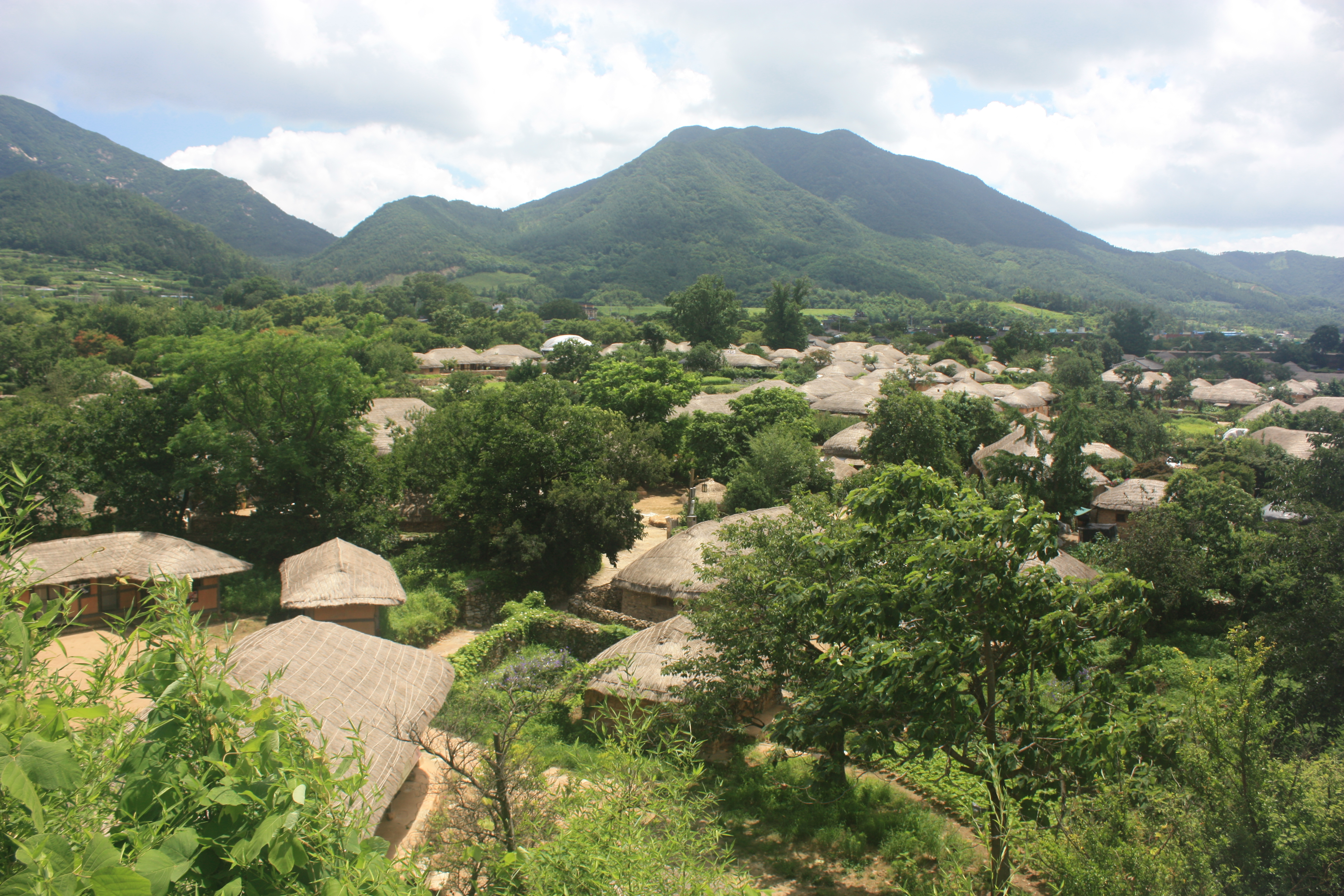
- Interactive map of Naganeupseong Folk Village
- 34°54′25″N 127°20′20″E
- Location: Nagan-myeon, Suncheon, South Jeolla, South Korea

History
- Built: 1397

Site notes
- Area: 223,108 m^{2}

Korean name
- Hangul: 낙안읍성
- Hanja: 樂安邑城
- RR: Naganeupseong
- MR: Naganŭpsŏng

Naganeupseong Folk Village (Korean: 낙안읍성; Hanja: 樂安邑城) is a Korean historic village located in Nagan-myeon, Suncheon, South Jeolla, South Korea. This well-preserved walled town served as an administrative core for the county during the Joseon Dynasty and it is designated as historical site N0. 302.

== Overview ==
Naganeupseong is a former administrative town. It consists of three neighborhoods located inside fortress walls, on a level field surrounded by mountains. It has well-preserved buildings such as a fortress, government buildings, and a cluster of private houses. The houses are hanok-style: they have straw roofs, clay rooms, and Korean-style verandas. This is notable because the original town was mainly inhabited by common people and not aristocrats.

Even today, the town is still actively occupied by around 100 households. Many work as farmers that carry out the traditional lifestyle and arts of the region.

== History ==
The fortress was constructed in 1397 by general Kim Bin-gil, during the reign of King Taejo of Joseon. The fortress was intended to defend the area after the defeat of the Wokou pirates. It was initially surrounded by a sand wall, but was fortified with a stone wall during the rule of King Injo in order to better defend itself against Japanese pirates. The project was carried out under the guidance of general Im Gyeong-eop (1594–1646), who served as the governor of Nagan from 1626 to 1628. When he died, a monumental house was built by the people of Nagan, which still stands in the village to this day.

Nine 19th century thatched-roof houses are designated as national heritages, because they are valuable examples of South Jeolla architecture during the Joseon period.

Naganeupseong was designated as National Heritage (Historic Site No. 302) in 1983. Since then, a series of projects have been conducted to preserve the village landscape. 231 houses were kept in their original condition, and are thus considered valuable sources for academic research. The village was also included on the tentative list of UNESCO's World Heritage Sites in 2010.

== Cultural Events ==
The fortress and the village are home to various cultural events of the region. One of the most celebrated is the annual South Jeolla Food Festival, held every year in October, where people can enjoy and learn about the regional cuisine.

Nagan is also a venue for Korean traditional music including nongak ("farmer's music"), pansori and communal rituals. Oh Tae-seok, a pansori artist popular when South Korea was under Japanese colonial rule, was born in the village and his house is still preserved by the city of Suncheon.

== Other ==
Due to its pristine condition, Naganeupseong has been a popular filming location for period films and drama series, including "Masquerade" (2012), "Dong Yi" (2010), "Taegukgi: The Brotherhood of War" (2004) and more.

== Gallery ==
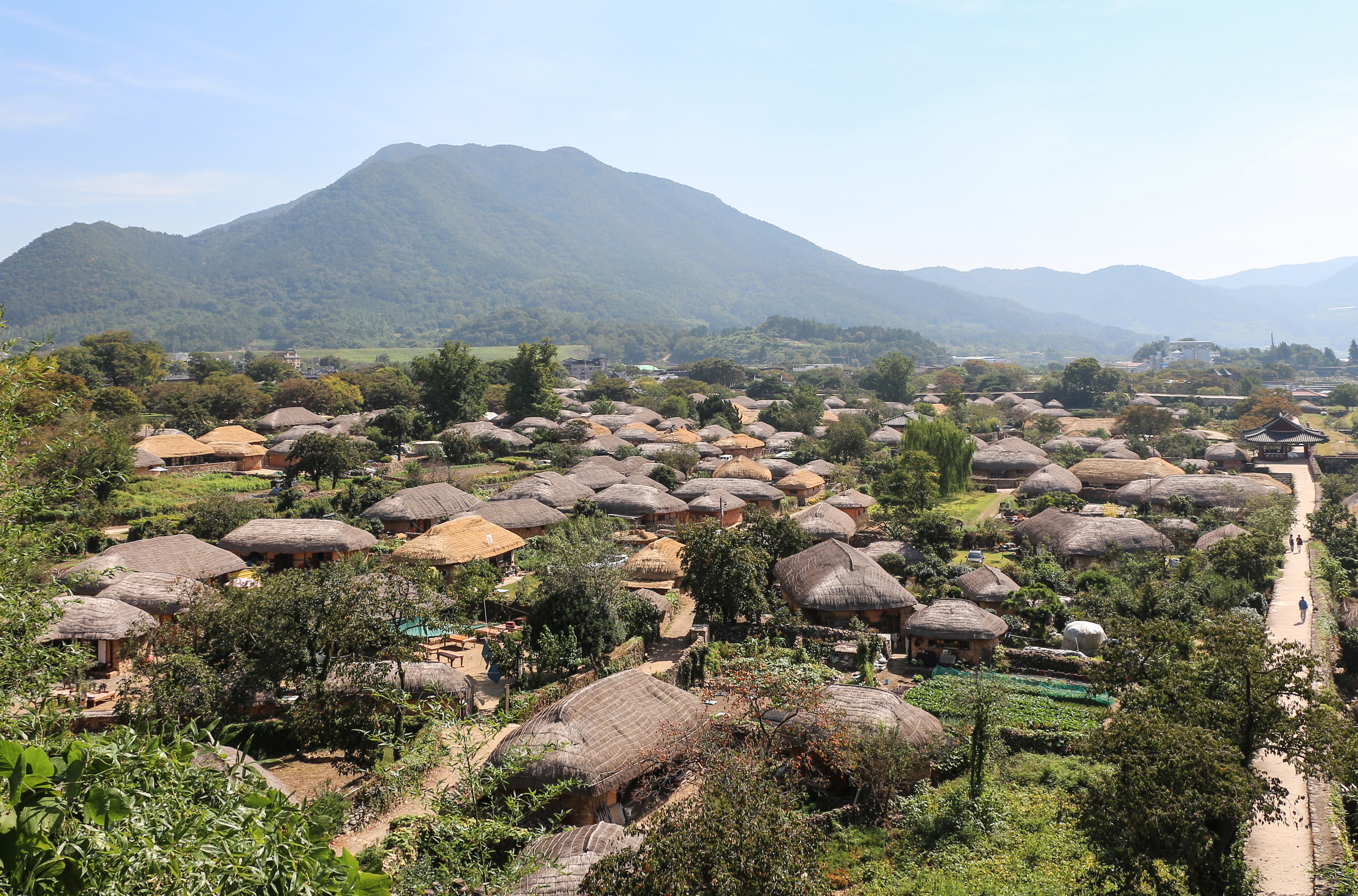
Naganeupseong Folk Village

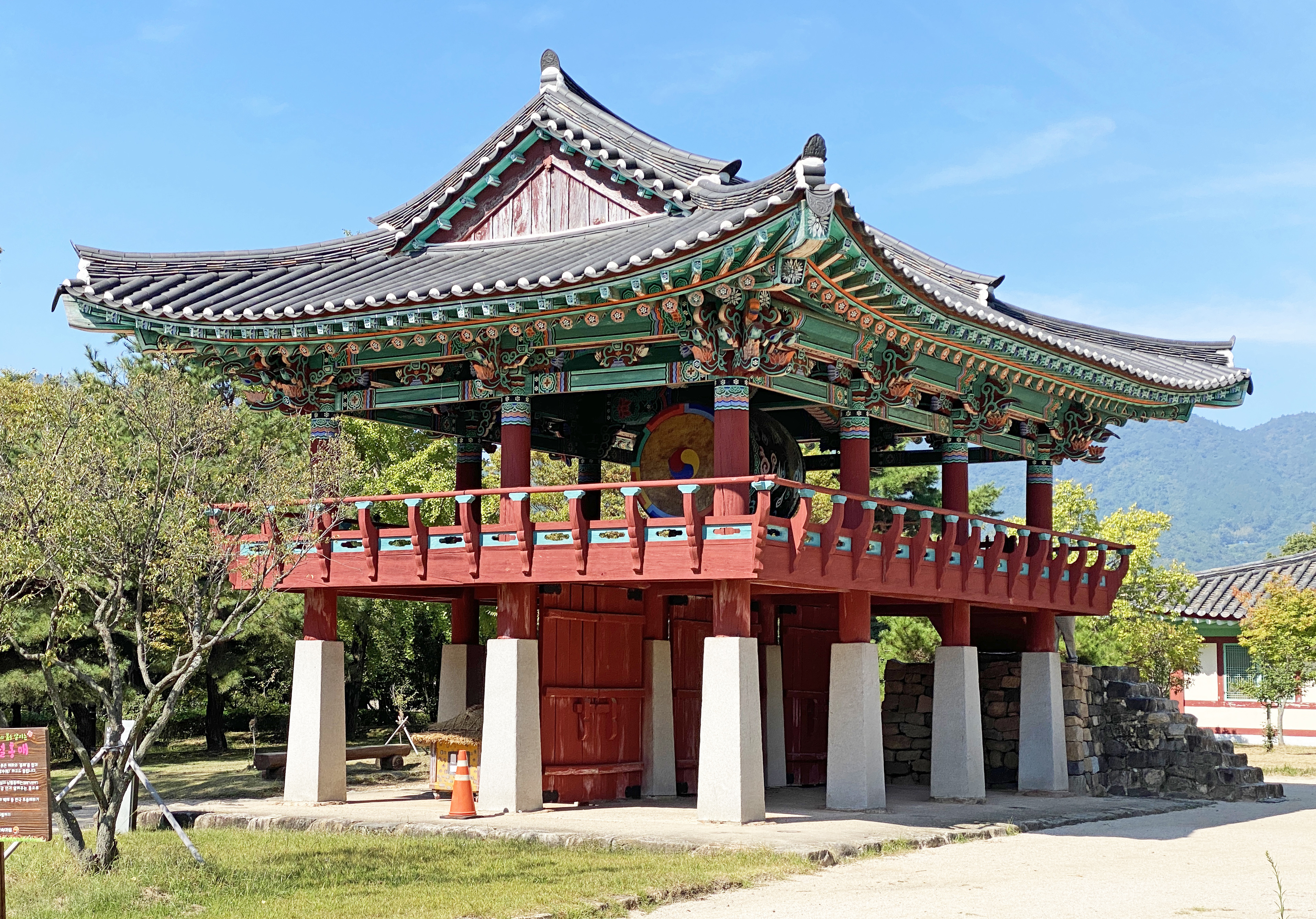
Nangmillu Pavilion

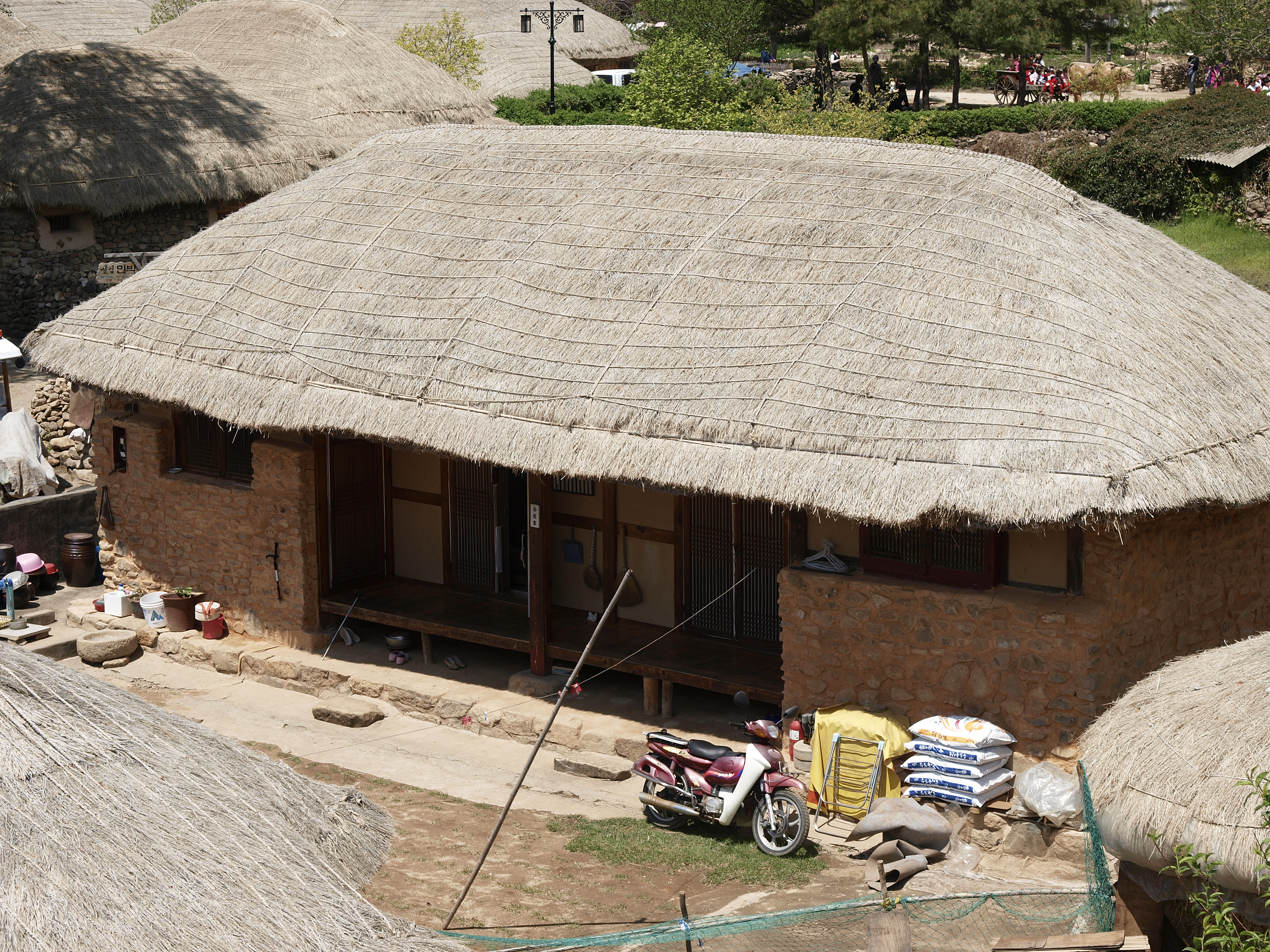
House with straw roof

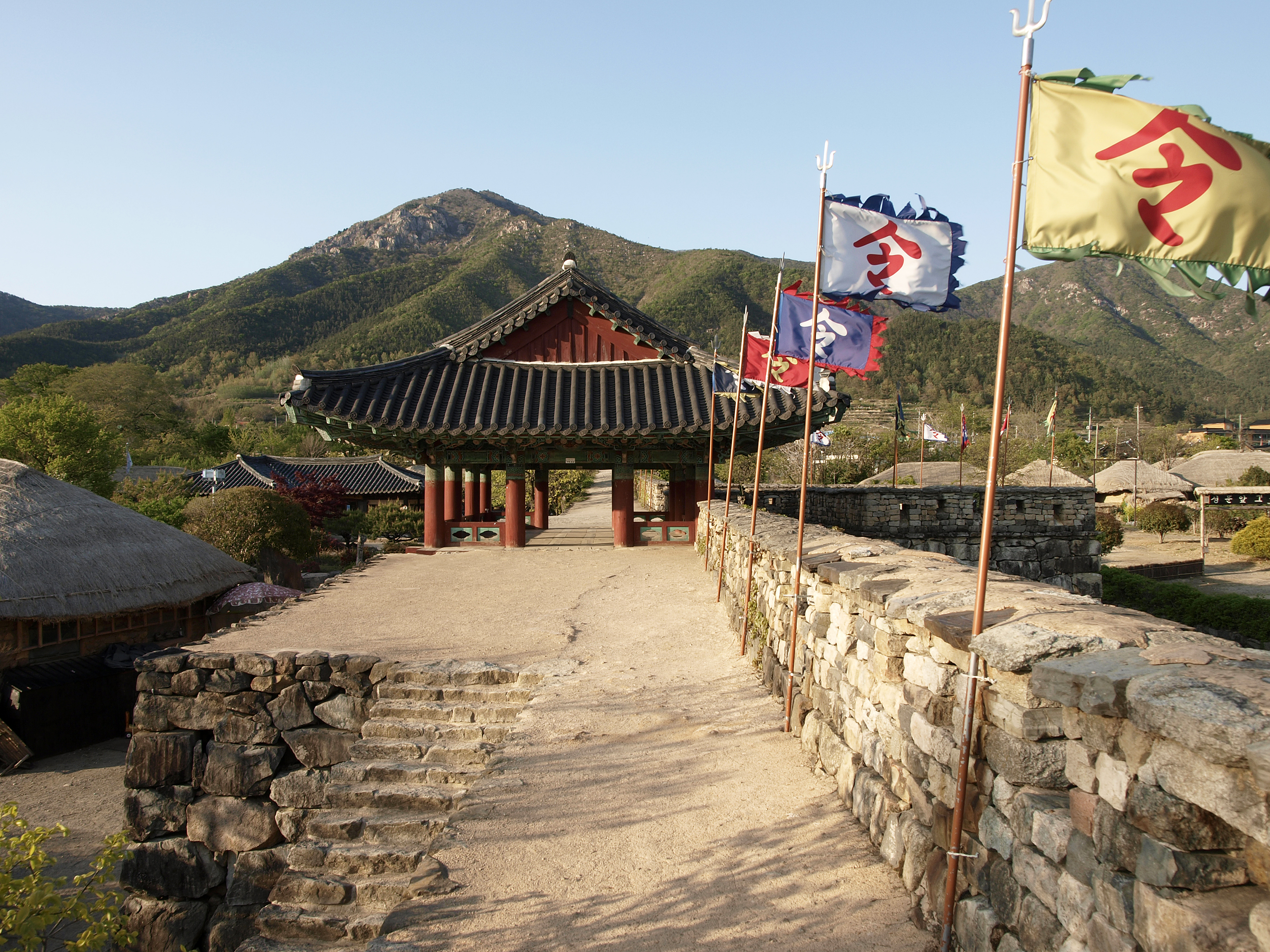
Wall and gate at south east
