= Korea Baduk High School =

Coordinates: 35.0743°N 127.240°E

Korea Baduk High School 한국바둑고등학교
- 44-25 Gusangangbyeon-gil, Juam-myeon, Gusan-ri, Suncheon-si, Jeollanam-do; South Korea

Information
- Type: Public
- Motto: 창의적 사고, 지혜로운 변화
- Established: 1972
- Principal: Kim Jong-gu (김종구)
- Deputy Principal: Joo Kyeong-joong (주경중)
- Faculty: 31 (as of 2015)
- Gender: Boys and Girls
- Enrolment: 105 (as of 2015)
- Website: http://kbd.hs.jne.kr/

Korea Baduk High School (Korean: 한국바둑고등학교) is a public high school located in Suncheon, South Jeolla Province, South Korea that has a specialised Baduk programme for its students.

== History ==
Korea Baduk High School was founded on March 9, 1972, under the name Jooam High School (주암종합고등학교). The current principal Kim Jong-gu was appointed on March 1, 2014, as the school's 16th principal. As of 10 February 2015, there are a total of 5,076 graduates.
