= Suncheon Bay Garden Expo 2013 =

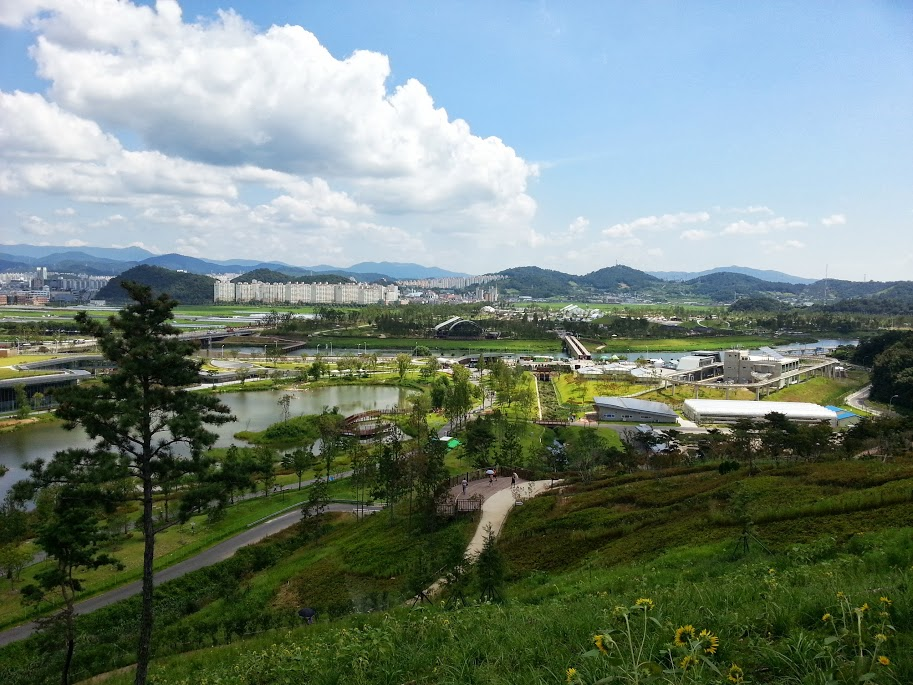
Panorama of International Garden Exposition Suncheon Bay Korea 2013

The Suncheon Bay Garden Expo 2013 (Korean: 2013순천만국제정원박람회; Hanja: 2013順天灣國際庭園博覽會) was the first of its kind to be held in Korea. The Expo focused on green technology development such as solar energy, sustainable garden development, and electric transportation. It showcased green technologies, international garden exhibits, and wetland conservation. It was held in jointly in Suncheon and Suncheon Bay.

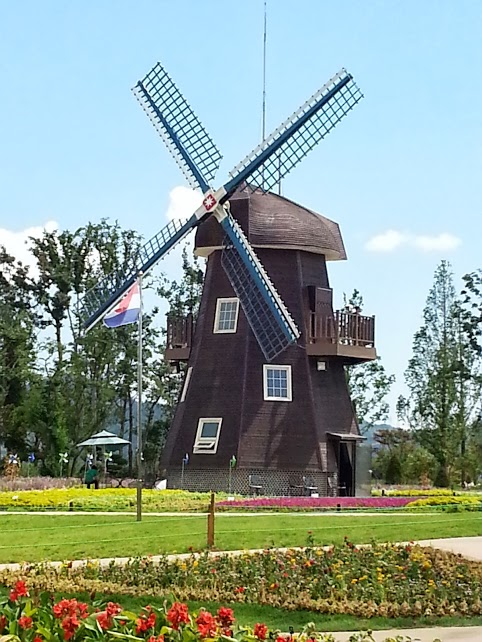
Netherlands garden of International Garden Exposition Suncheon Bay Korea 2013

== Overview ==
- Duration: 2013. Apr. 20 ~ 2013. Oct. 20 (6 months)
- Theme: The Garden of Earth
- Location: Around Suncheon Bay, Korea
- Area: 1,527,000 m^{2} (152.7 ha)
- Exhibitions: Various eco-parks such as world gardens, arboretum, international wetland center, etc.
- Estimated visitors: 5 million visitors
- personal rapid transit to convey visitors from the Garden Expo site to Suncheon Bay.

== Objectives ==
- Develop Suncheon Bay, one of the world's top five coastal wetlands and the most well-preserved coastal wetland in the world, into a unique eco garden.
- Develop Suncheon Bay into a representative brand of Korea that is highly recognizable by citizens of the world.
- Build a reservoir to prevent floods and natural disasters.
- Maximize the economic value through developing green industries (forestry, floriculture, and gardening) and ecotourism.

== Title ==
- The 2013 title, "Garden of the Earth," symbolizes the value and characteristic of Suncheon Bay, preserved as one of the best natural gardens of the world.

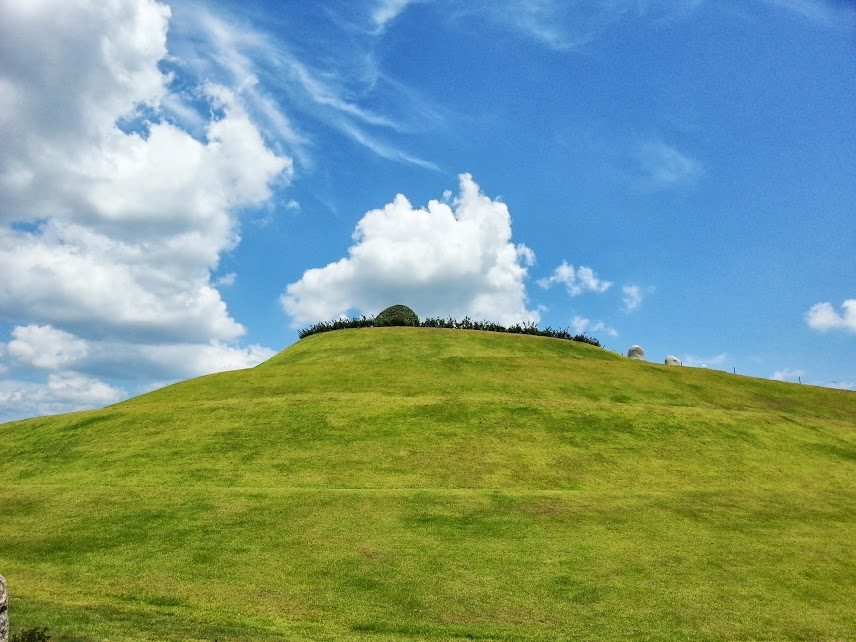
A hill near a lake garden of International Garden Exposition Suncheon Bay Korea 2013

== See also ==
- List of festivals in South Korea
- List of festivals in Asia
