= Beopjeongdong =

Administrative unit of South Korea

- Hangul: 법정동
- Hanja: 法定洞
- RR: beopjeongdong
- MR: pŏpchŏngdong

Beopjeongdong (Korean: 법정동, translated to English variously as legal dong, legal district or legal status neighbourhood) is an administrative district in South Korea designated by law with a fixed name and territory. Its name typically reflects a traditional local place name, and most current beopjeongdong boundaries date from the 1914 administrative district consolidation carried out during the Japanese colonial period. The framework of present-day beopjeongdong boundaries was established in the 1910s, when the Government-General of Chōsen's land survey project produced an extensive set of cadastral maps. Each beopjeongdong is administered through an administrative dong (haengjeongdong).

A beopjeongdong code consists of eight digits organized into three tiers — province/metropolitan city (major classification), city/county/district (intermediate classification), and town/township/dong (minor classification) — and is managed by Statistics Korea through its Korean Standard Classification of Administrative Areas, which exists to standardize statistical reporting and enable comparison of data across regions.

== Distinction from administrative dong ==
Beopjeongdong is not used for direct administrative functions, but rather for traditional regional division, addressing, and cadastral purposes. A single beopjeongdong may be administered by multiple administrative dong, or a single administrative dong may administer multiple beopjeongdong. The Ministry of the Interior and Safety publishes resident registration population statistics separately by administrative dong and by beopjeongdong, distinguishing between the administrative agency (administrative dong) and its jurisdictional area (beopjeongdong).

Academically, the two units are also clearly distinguished by character: beopjeongdong is a geographic unit fixed by law and maintained with stability, whereas administrative dong is an operational unit that can be divided or merged to ensure administrative efficiency, taking into account factors such as population size, urban development, and service delivery needs. Boundaries recorded in cadastral records, such as cadastral maps and forest maps, clarify the legal location of land parcels and serve as the foundational basis for determining beopjeongdong boundaries; because the administrative district system itself is built on parcel-numbering areas, cadastral records function as the core basis for beopjeongdong boundary administration.

Except in special cases — such as when a local community abolishes or renames a beopjeongdong (e.g. Samcheon-dong in Seo District, Daejeon, or Poi-dong and Hail-dong in Gangnam and Gangdong Districts, Seoul), or when an existing administrative unit or part of one is incorporated into the boundary of a different higher-level administrative district (e.g. Gonghang-dong in Gangseo District, Seoul, or Daehyeon-dong in Buk District, Daegu) — beopjeongdong boundaries rarely change.

However, when urban development alters land divisions, beopjeongdong boundaries are sometimes newly adjusted along streets based on the existing division (e.g. Dongcheon-dong in Buk District, Daegu), or, more rarely, multiple beopjeongdong are merged into one (e.g. Jingwan-dong in Eunpyeong District, Seoul); but such adjustments are not always carried out.

Most beopjeongdong are named "X-dong" for a given area, but in historic urban districts, street names were sometimes designated as beopjeongdong, taking the form "X-ro" or "X-ga" (for example, Sejong-ro and Euljiro 2-ga in Jongno District, Seoul). This reflects how the administrative units of the Japanese colonial period — jeong (町), tong (通), and jeongmok (丁目) — were unified into the single post-liberation category of beopjeongdong, even though their names were not standardized and instead became dong (洞), ro (路), and ga (街) respectively, preserving the original distinction. In some cases, however, such as Suseong-dong 1–4-ga in Suseong District, Daegu, and Seongsu-dong 1–2-ga in Seongdong District, Seoul, beopjeongdong established after liberation also followed the older naming convention of attaching "-ga."

The primary administrative agency with jurisdiction over a beopjeongdong is the dong administrative welfare center (operating as an administrative dong).

== Use ==
Beopjeongdong serves as the official unit for indicating the location of land and buildings in real estate registration and cadastral administration. The Registration of Real Estate Rules require the heading section of a land registration record to include a field for the location and lot number, and the location name used in this field is the beopjeongdong. For this reason, even when an administrative dong's name changes due to urban development or administrative dong consolidation, the address shown on legal documents such as certified copies of the register or land registers continues to be based on the beopjeongdong.

== Boundary inconsistencies ==
Because beopjeongdong boundaries are rarely changed once established, a structural problem has emerged in which these boundaries diverge from actual living areas and facility boundaries during the course of urban development. Following the enforcement of the Land Readjustment Project Act in 1966, which enabled residential land development, and the Rural Modernization Promotion Act in 1970, which enabled farmland readjustment projects, parcel boundaries were significantly altered, including straightening, as land was reorganized. However, the laws of the time did not provide sufficient legal grounds for adjusting administrative district boundaries between dong, leaving numerous cases in which these spatial changes were never reflected in beopjeongdong boundaries.

Such inconsistencies typically take the form of a single building or facility being located across two or more beopjeongdong, or across two or more basic local governments. In Jeongneung-dong and Donam-dong in Seongbuk District, Seoul, the filling-in of a drainage channel and the construction of large-scale housing complexes in the 1960s eliminated the original boundary marker, resulting in cases where a single building was registered across both beopjeongdong. In Hawolgok-dong and Jangwi-dong, also in Seongbuk District, a school facility expanded without any accompanying administrative boundary change, creating a beopjeongdong boundary that cut directly through the school grounds. Between Suwon and Yongin in Gyeonggi Province, an apartment complex built during a new town development in 1994 was incorporated in a way that did not align with the administrative boundary; this inconsistency was only resolved in 2019, through an exchange of land parcels between the two cities.

Such boundary inconsistencies are cited as a structural problem causing inconvenience across a wide range of administrative services, including the exercise of property rights, tax assessment, school assignment, and emergency response. In a survey of 133 cadastral and administrative officials, 63% of respondents agreed that administrative boundary changes were necessary, while procedural complexity and the reluctance of responsible agencies to take initiative were identified as the main factors delaying actual boundary adjustments.

== Boundary change procedures ==
The procedure for changing an administrative district boundary, including a beopjeongdong boundary, differs depending on whether the change involves a non-autonomous district, town, township, or dong, or whether it involves a province, metropolitan city, city, county, or autonomous district.

Boundary changes between non-autonomous districts, towns, townships, and dong are based on Article 7 of the Local Autonomy Act and Article 9-2 of the Rules on the Handling of Administrative District Adjustment Affairs. When a development or redevelopment project site spans two or more administrative districts, the local government carries out the adjustment procedure upon application by the project operator.

Boundary changes between provinces, metropolitan cities, cities, counties, and autonomous districts are based on Articles 5 and 6 of the Local Autonomy Act and Article 4 of its enforcement decree. The head of a local government may apply to the Minister of the Interior and Safety for boundary adjustment when there is significant resident inconvenience caused by a mismatch between the jurisdictional boundary and the actual living area, and such an application requires the consent of at least two-thirds of the sitting members of the local council. The adjustment procedure proceeds through a field survey of the target area, consent of the local council, notification and public announcement by the Ministry of the Interior and Safety, and the formation of a voluntary boundary-adjustment consultative body; if the parties fail to reach agreement, the Minister of the Interior and Safety may request deliberation by the Central Dispute Mediation Committee. Between 1979 and 2023, only 45 boundary changes were carried out through this process, an outcome cited as evidence that, although the legal framework exists, its actual application remains limited.

== Examples of usage ==
1. Umyeon-dong is a beopjeongdong in Seocho District, Seoul, administered by the administrative dong of Yangjae 1-dong.
2. Daemyeong-dong is a beopjeongdong in Nam District, Daegu, administered separately by the administrative dong units Daemyeong 1-dong through Daemyeong 6-dong, Daemyeong 9-dong, Daemyeong 10-dong, and Daemyeong 11-dong.
3. Mia-dong is a beopjeongdong in Gangbuk District, Seoul, administered separately by the administrative dong units Samyang-dong, Mia-dong, Songjung-dong, Songcheon-dong, and Samgaksan-dong.
4. The administrative dong of Bumin-dong in Seo District, Busan administers the beopjeongdong units Bumin-dong 1-ga, 2-ga, and 3-ga, and Buyong-dong 1-ga and 2-ga.
5. The administrative dong of Sinpo-dong in Jung District, Incheon administers beopjeongdong units including Jungang-dong 1-ga through 4-ga, Haean-dong 1-ga through 4-ga, Gwan-dong 1-ga through 3-ga, Hang-dong 1-ga through 7-ga, Songhak-dong 1-ga through 3-ga, Sa-dong, Sinsaeng-dong, Sinpo-dong, and Dap-dong.
6. The administrative dong of Dongbaek-dong in Giheung District, Yongin, Gyeonggi Province, administers the beopjeongdong units Jung-dong and Dongbaek-dong.

== See also ==
- Dong (administrative division)
- Administrative dong
- Addresses in South Korea

== Bibliography ==
- Korean Society for Cultural and Historical Geography (2008). The Geography of Place Names: Advances in Building a Place Name Database [지명의 지리학]. Pureungil. pp. 406–414.
- Choi, Ik-Soo; Seo, Yong-Su (December 2025). "An Empirical Study on the Readjustment of Administrative District Boundaries: Focusing on the Analysis of Boundary Inconsistencies in Legal Dong Areas Based on Cadastral Information". Journal of the Korean Cadastre Information Association. 27 (3): 304–321. doi:10.46416/JKCIA.2025.12.27.3.304.
- "Nationwide Legal Dong (전국 법정동)". Public Data Portal. Ministry of Land, Infrastructure and Transport.
- "Korean Standard Classification of Administrative Areas". Statistical Classification Portal. Statistics Korea.
- "Resident Registration Population Statistics". Ministry of the Interior and Safety.
- "Registration of Real Estate Rules (부동산등기규칙)". Korean Law Information Center. Ministry of Government Legislation.
