= Dong (administrative division) =

Administrative unit of districts throughout Korea

- Neighborhood
- Hangul: 동
- Hanja: 洞
- RR: dong
- MR: tong

Administrative neighborhood
- Hangul: 행정동
- Hanja: 行政洞
- RR: haengjeongdong
- MR: haengjŏngdong

Legal-status neighborhood
- Hangul: 법정동
- Hanja: 法定洞
- RR: beopjeongdong
- MR: pŏpchŏngdong

A dong (Korean: 동; IPA: [to̞ŋ]) or neighborhood is a submunicipal level administrative unit of a city and of those cities which are not divided into wards throughout Korea. The unit is often translated as neighborhood and has been used in administrative divisions of both North Korea and South Korea.

== In South Korea ==
A dong is, usually, the smallest level of urban-area division to have its own office and staff in South Korea. There are two types of dong: beopjeongdong, legal-status neighborhood (법정동) and administrative neighborhood (행정동).

For land property and (old) address, legal-status neighborhood is mainly used. Unlike what the name indicates, they are not defined by any written law. Instead, most of names are came from customary law, which indicates historical names. "Administrative neighborhood", however, is defined by local governments to make an office (community center). Community centers provide some administrative services such as residential/birth registration or death notification, to relieve service pressure of local government. Also, electoral districts are based on administrative neighborhood.

In usual cases, an administrative neighborhood is set by population of the area to match demands for the civil services. Because legal-status neighborhood uses historical name, recently developed (populated) area can be grouped as a single legal-status neighborhood. In such places, it can be divided into several administrative neighborhoods. Sillim-dong is a typical example for this case. For the same reason, there are some inverse cases, i.e. a single administrative neighborhood holding multiple legal-status neighborhoods. Such cases contain an undeveloped suburban area, or a recently declining area.

The primary division of a dong is the tong (통/統), but divisions at this level and below are used rarely in daily life. Cases using tong contain school districts or military services. Some dong are subdivided into ga (가/街), which are not a separate level of government but only exist for use in addresses. Many major thoroughfares in Seoul, Busan, and other cities are also subdivided into ga.

The widest legal-status dong is Unseo-dong in Jung District, Incheon Metropolitan City, with an area of 51.56 km^{2} (19.91 sq mi). Incheon International Airport occupies most of the area. This is wider than Anyang City, with an area of 58.46 km^{2} (22.57 sq mi), and Gyeryong City, with an area of 60.7 km^{2} (23.4 sq mi). The narrowest legal-status dong is Sangdeok-dong in Jung District, Daegu Metropolitan City, with an area of 2,971 m^{2} (0.003 km^{2}).

== In popular culture ==
The YouTuber iGoBart has produced a YouTube series that covers each of Seoul's dong.

== See also ==
- Administrative divisions of North Korea
- Administrative divisions of South Korea
- Barangay, a similar subdivision of Philippines
