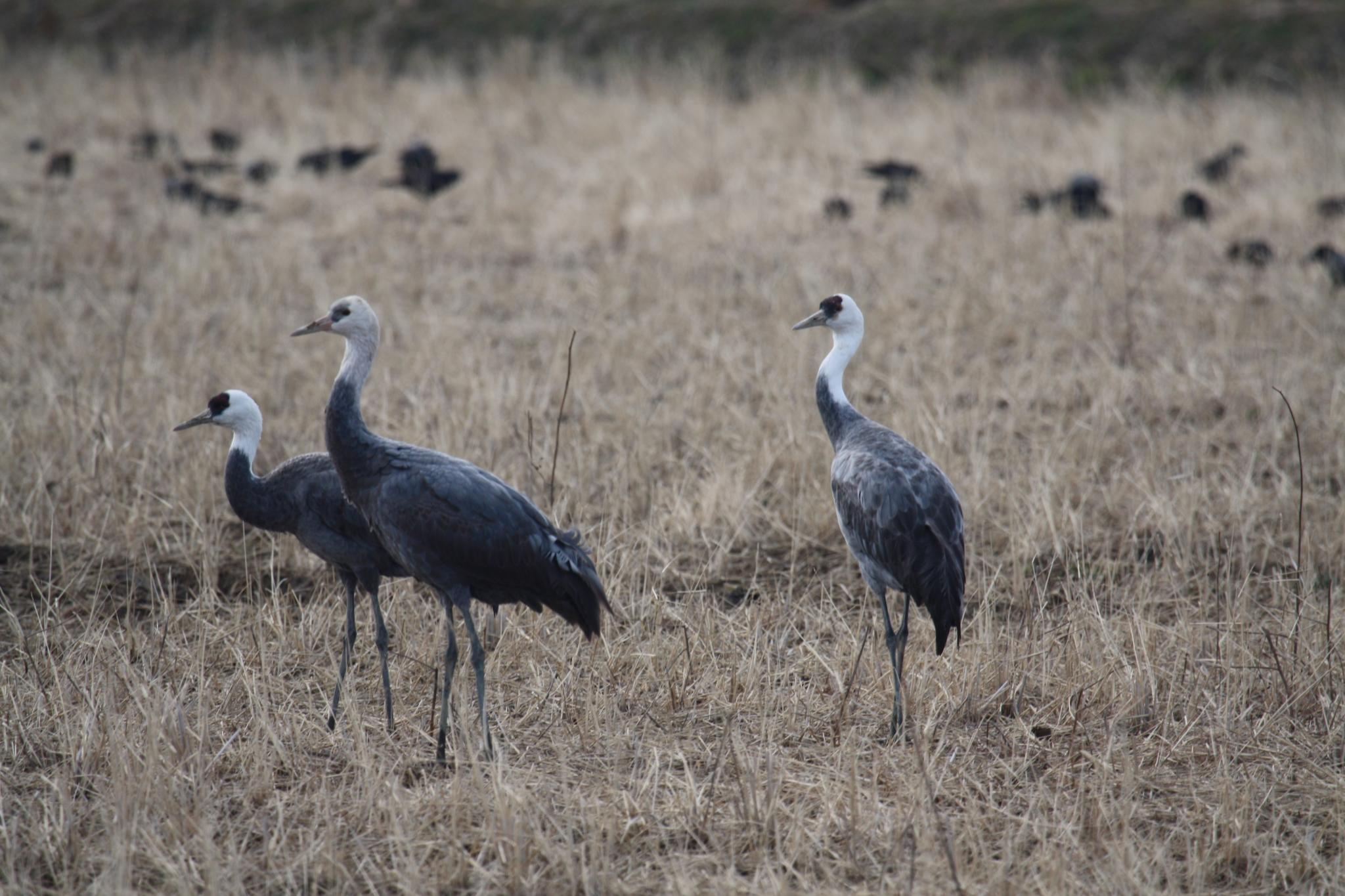
- Wintering in Kyushu, Japan

Conservation status
- Vulnerable (IUCN 3.1)
- CITES Appendix I

Scientific classification
- Kingdom: Animalia
- Phylum: Chordata
- Class: Aves
- Order: Gruiformes
- Family: Gruidae
- Genus: Grus
- Species: G. monacha

Binomial name
- Grus monacha Temminck, 1835
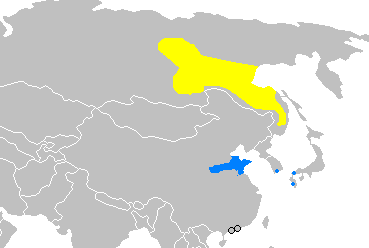
- Hooded crane distribution Yellow: breeding range Blue: wintering range

= Hooded crane =

Species of large bird from Asia

The hooded crane (Grus monacha) is a small, migratory crane native to East Asia, breeding in Siberia, Russia and the Heilongjiang province of China and wintering in South Korea, south-eastern China, Mongolia, and Japan, with the latter's Izumi Feeding Station, located on the island of Kyushu, housing over 80% of the world’s population during winter. It is classified as Vulnerable under the IUCN Red list, with an estimated population of 19300. It is mostly grey, with a white head and neck and an exposed, bristle-covered crown.

== Description ==
Hooded cranes have a slate grey body, with black primaries, secondaries, tails, and tail coverts. The neck and head are white, with the front part of the crown featherless and covered in black bristles. A small patch of black feathers are present between the beak and eyes. It is on the smaller side of crane species, weighing on average 3.93 kg (males) and 3.54 kg (females), with a height of approximately 100cm and a wingspan of 187 cm. The legs and feet are black, the bill a tan yellow and the eyes are hazel to brown. There is no sexual dimorphism in plumage. Juveniles are similar in color, with white and black feathers on the crown during their first year, and a slight yellow or brown tinge on head and neck feathers.

== Distribution ==
As a migratory bird, the hooded crane splits time between breeding zones, located in Siberia, Russia and Heilongjiang, and wintering zones, located in South Korea, south-eastern China and Japan.

=== Breeding season ===
During the breeding season, they occupy marshlands (primarily bogs) in forested areas in the Russian taiga. Breeding habitat is highly dispersed, with individual bogs each occupied by a single pair, and spread across the basins of the Middle Lena River, Upper Vilyui River, Middle Aldan River, Chara River, Makharchan River, Middle and Lower Amur River, Bikin River and Iman River. Some cranes also breed in China, where they use wetlands located in mountain valleys throughout the Lesser Khingan Mountains. Breeding has not been recorded in Mongolia, though it may happen.

=== Non-breeding season ===
When not breeding, they spend most of their time in rice paddies, fields and rivers. The largest wintering site is located at the Izumi Feeding Station, in Kyushu, Japan, where the 2017-2018 survey counted 14 000 individuals. Other sites include the Suncheon Bay in Korea, where recent counts have put the group at 1 700 individuals, up from the 1996 number of 200, and throughout parts of the Yangtze River, with an estimated 1000 to 1 00 individuals.

=== Migration ===
During migration, large groups gather at staging grounds in Russia, with the Zeya-Bureya Plain, located in the Amur province, receiving over 3 000 individuals in 2016. Two main migrations pathways exist. The first, which is taken by the majority of hooded cranes, travels through the Korean peninsula along the west coast or through the Nakdong River. This is the pathway taken by the Izumi colony. The second pathway passes through northern China and eastern Mongolia, heading down to the Yangtze River, where they winter at the many lakes present across the basin.

== Taxonomy ==
A monotypic species, the hooded crane is part of the genus Grus, which itself is a part of the Gruidae family. It is one of 15 in this family. It was originally described by Dutch zoologist Coenraad Jacob Temminck, during his time as director of the National Museum of Natural History in Leiden. He assigned it the binomial name Grus monacha, which stands to this day. Occasionally, it has been called Grus monachus. This name is derived from the latin word for nun (monacha) and references the “hood” of the crane. In french, it bears the name grue moine, which translate to monk crane, and in Japanese it is known as ナベヅル (nabezuru) meaning cooking pot crane, a reference to its grey plumage. Despite being genetically most closely related to the Black-Necked Crane, Hooded and Eurasian Crane hybrids have been spotted in Japan and Russia.

== Behavior ==
=== Diet ===
The hooded crane is an omnivorous, opportunistic forager, eating many types of berries (such as cranberries and bilberries) and aquatic plants (such as Vallisneria and Potamogeton), as well as occasionally eating vertebrates, including amphibians and fish, and many species of insects. During winter, they will consume mostly rice and grains at the various feeding stations put out for them, including the famous Izumi Feeding Station. Those overwintering outside of feeding stations (such as those in the Yangtze River basin) will eat mostly aquatic plants.

=== Reproduction ===
Hooded cranes reach sexual maturity once they hit the age of 3, but may only breed later in life once a pair has been formed. Like many other cranes, hooded cranes form monogamous pairs and mate for life, but will recouple if a mate dies. The breeding season runs from April until August, with eggs being laid in April or May, and the family group leaving the nest in August.

The nest itself is made of sphagnum as the base, with added chunks of peat and sedge rhizomes. The upper portion is a mixture of sedge stalks and leaves, and occasionally branches (birch or larch). The materials are taken from the directly surrounding environment, and this often turns the nest into a small island, possibly discouraging any predators. That being said, the potential predators are not well known. Hooded cranes are very discreet when nesting, making efforts to avoid detection while leaving and returning to the nest. This secretive nature makes it difficult to study tendencies, but leading theories are that the cranes return to the same nest over multiple years, with egg fragments up to 3 years old being found in some nests.

=== Vocalizations ===
==== Unison call ====
The hooded crane has a variety of calls for different purposes. The unison call, a duet performed between a mating pair, is usually paired with a dance. The female will let out a long call, and the male will answer with a shorter, disyllabic call. For each male call, the female responds with a short call. While the calling occurs, both the male and female throw their head upwards and raise their tertial feathers.

==== Other calls ====
A contact call is used to identify and locate each other, and is a soft, purring sound. An alarm call, consisting of a single short, sharp vocalization is made in case of danger.

== Threats ==
Despite a growing population, much of the hooded crane's breeding habitat is vulnerable to agriculture, with the draining of wetlands throughout its range causing a decline in suitable habitat. Daming, especially in areas of the Yangtze river, have also changed the local habitats of breeding sites.

The high concentration of individuals at feeding stations also pose an elevated risk for transmission of diseases such as avian influenza. This risk is further increased in Izumi, where poultry is a major driver of the local economy. Another study demonstrates that power lines may pose a risk, as they cause up to 46% of wing and leg fractures in cranes.

== Conservation ==
Conservation activities have been taken since 2008. Local universities, NGOs and communities are working together for a better and safer wintering location.

In South Korea, the hooded crane is designated a Natural Monument, which means it is protected under law. The city of Suncheon is making conservational efforts such as removing the power lines and providing them seed grains to feed on, and it has been successful. The wintering population of hooded cranes in Suncheon Bay is estimated to be around 7,600 individuals as for 2024, which has increased rapidly from only around 70 in the past.

The hooded crane is evaluated as Vulnerable on the IUCN Red List of Threatened Species. It is listed on Appendix I and II of CITES. A society, Grus monacha International Aid (白头鹤的故事), has been formed to find ways to protect the species.
