= Suncheon Bay =

Coastal wetland in South Korea

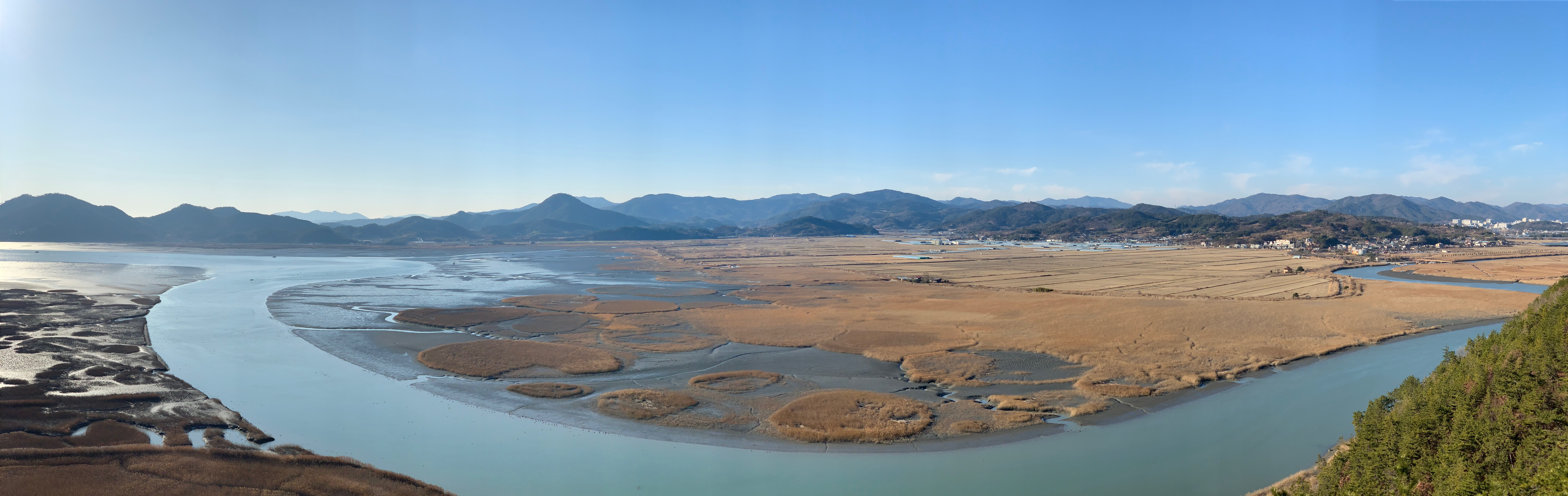
- Suncheon Bay view
- Interactive map of Suncheon Bay
- Location: Suncheon, South Jeolla Province, South Korea
- Coordinates: 34°48′N 127°24′E
- Area: 8,772 acres (35.50 km^{2})

Ramsar Wetland
- Designated: 20 January 2006
- Reference no.: 1594

Suncheon Bay is a coastal wetland in Suncheon, South Jeolla Province, South Korea. It is composed of a 3.5 km (2.2 mi) long stream, a 2,221 ha (5,490 acres) wide tideland and a 230 ha (570 acres) wide field of reeds. Due to its natural coast, it is the habitat of migratory birds, plants and animals. It is the first Korean coastal wetland, Suncheon Bay Ecological Park, to be registered on the list of The Ramsar Wetland on January 20, 2006.

== Characteristics ==
Suncheon Bay's wide tideland, field of reeds, and salt swamp have their natural scenes undamaged. The salt swamp functions in water pollution prevention and purification, keeping Suncheon Bay clean and undamaged. The shallow tideland at the river mouth has reasonable salt content, abundant organisms, and healthy water quality. These characteristics make Suncheon Bay a spawning ground for fish, crabs, shellfish, etc.

== Organisms ==
Animals hypothetically present

- Otter (Lutra lutra)
- Small-eared cat (Felis bengalensis manchurica)
- Raccoon dog (Nyctereutes procyonoides)
- Weasel (Mustela sibirica coreana)

Birds

- Hooded crane (Grus monacha)
- Eurasian spoonbill (Platalea leucorodia)
- Whooper swan (Cygnus cygnus)
- Chinese egret (Egretta eulophotes)

Plants

- Reed (Phragmites communis)
- Aster tripolium
- Plantago major for. yezomaritima

== Gallery ==
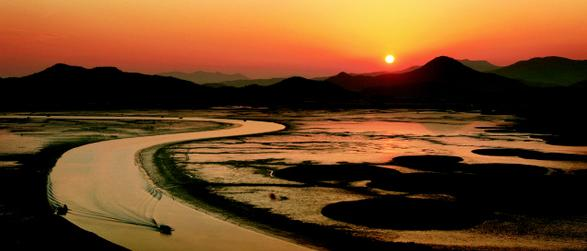
A view of the bay at dusk (2008)

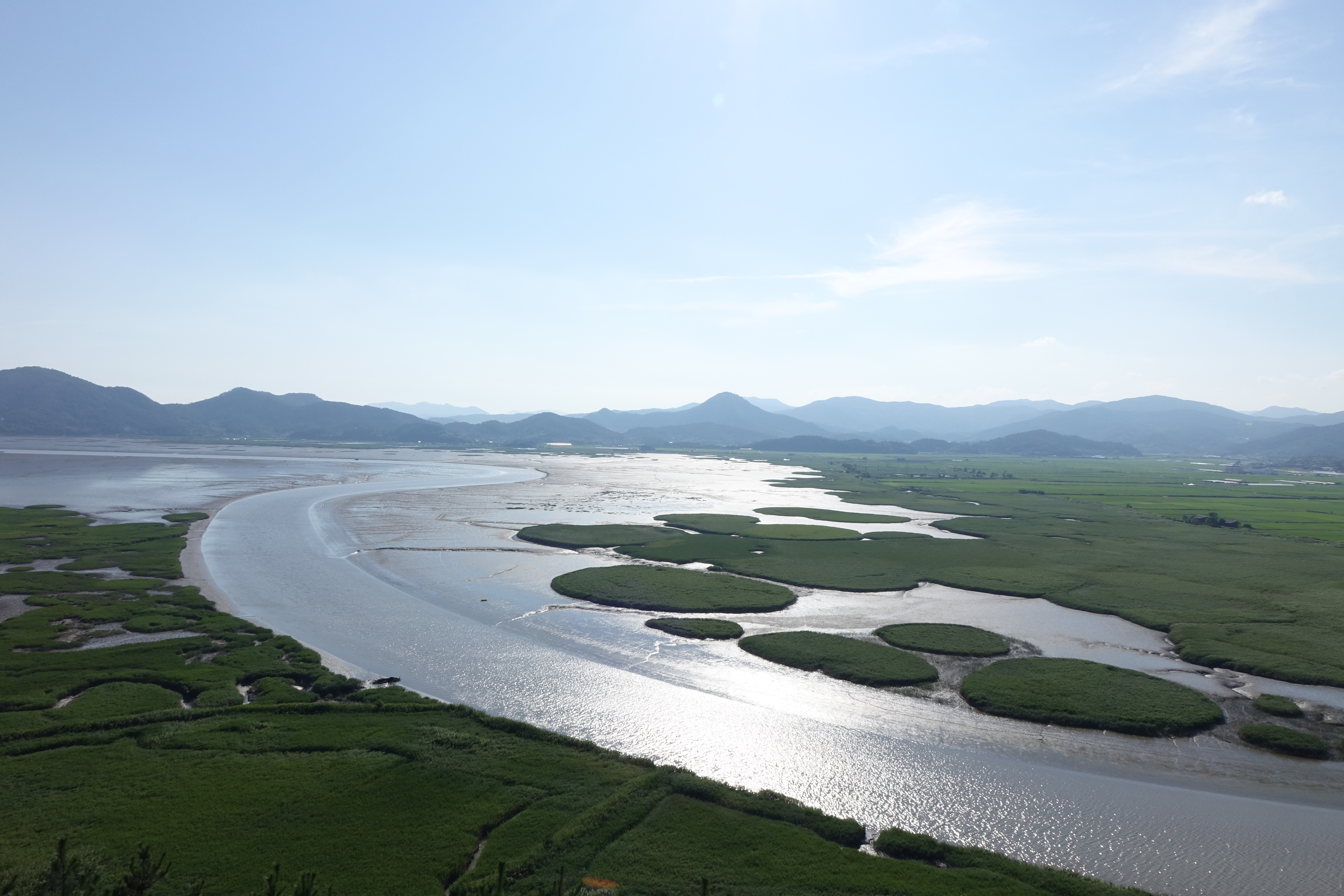
The plants in bloom (August 2015)

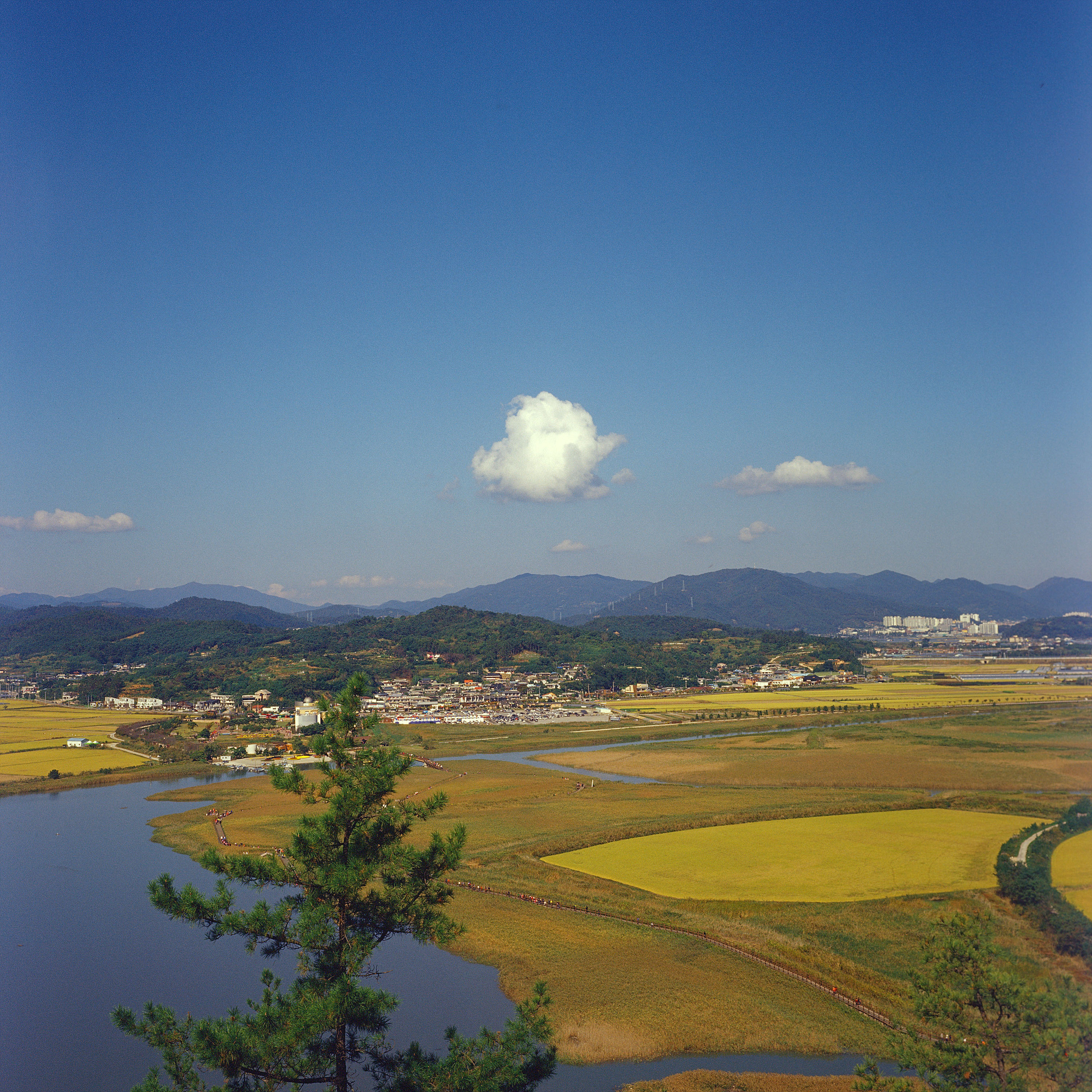
A nearby town (2013)

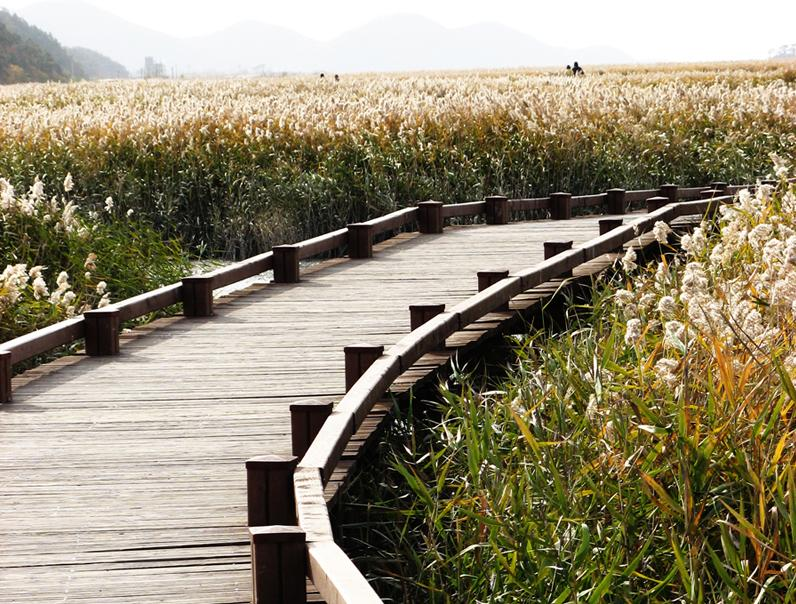
Walking path in the park (2008)
