= Suncheon =

City in Jeonnam-Gwangju, South Korea

- Municipal city
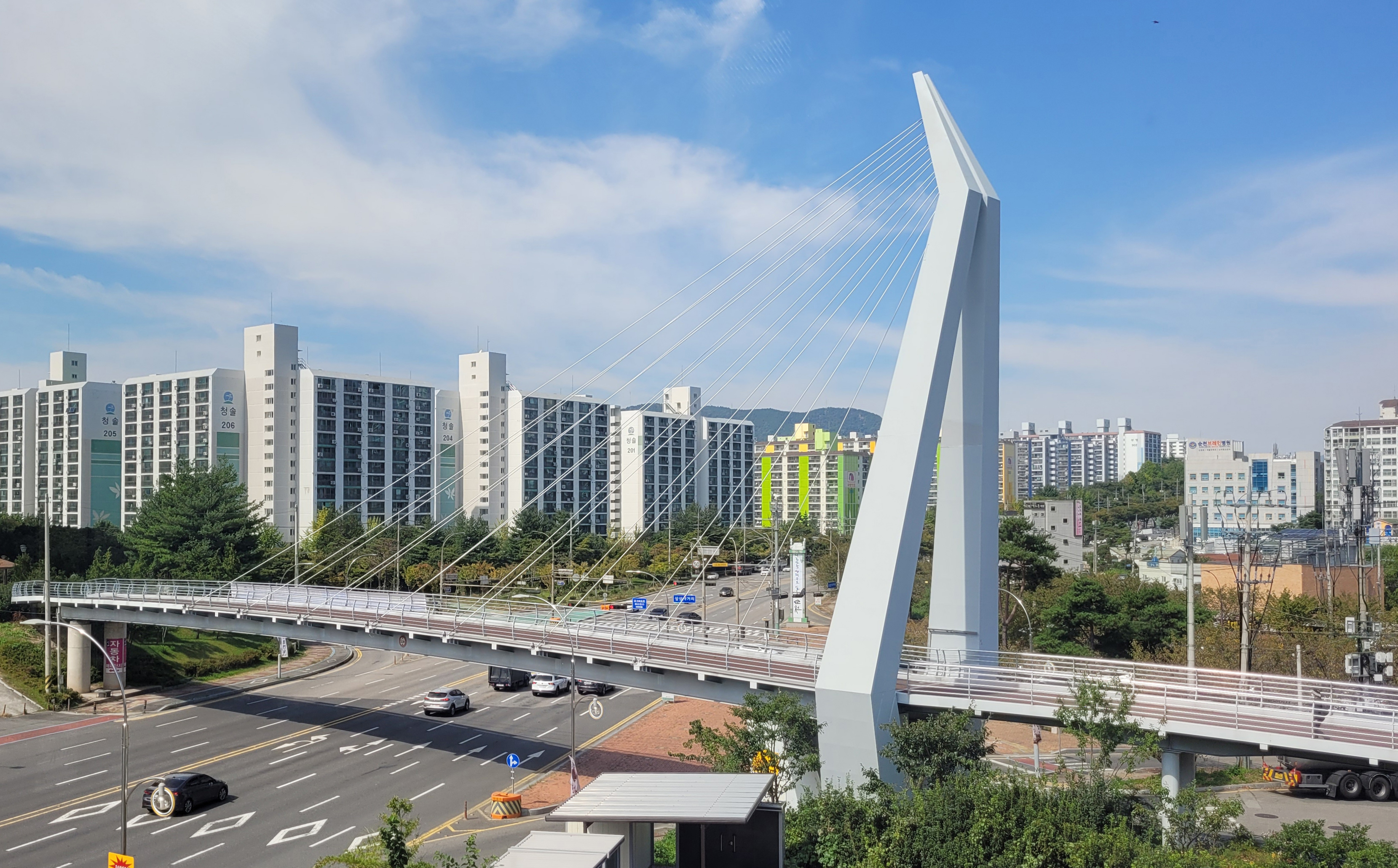
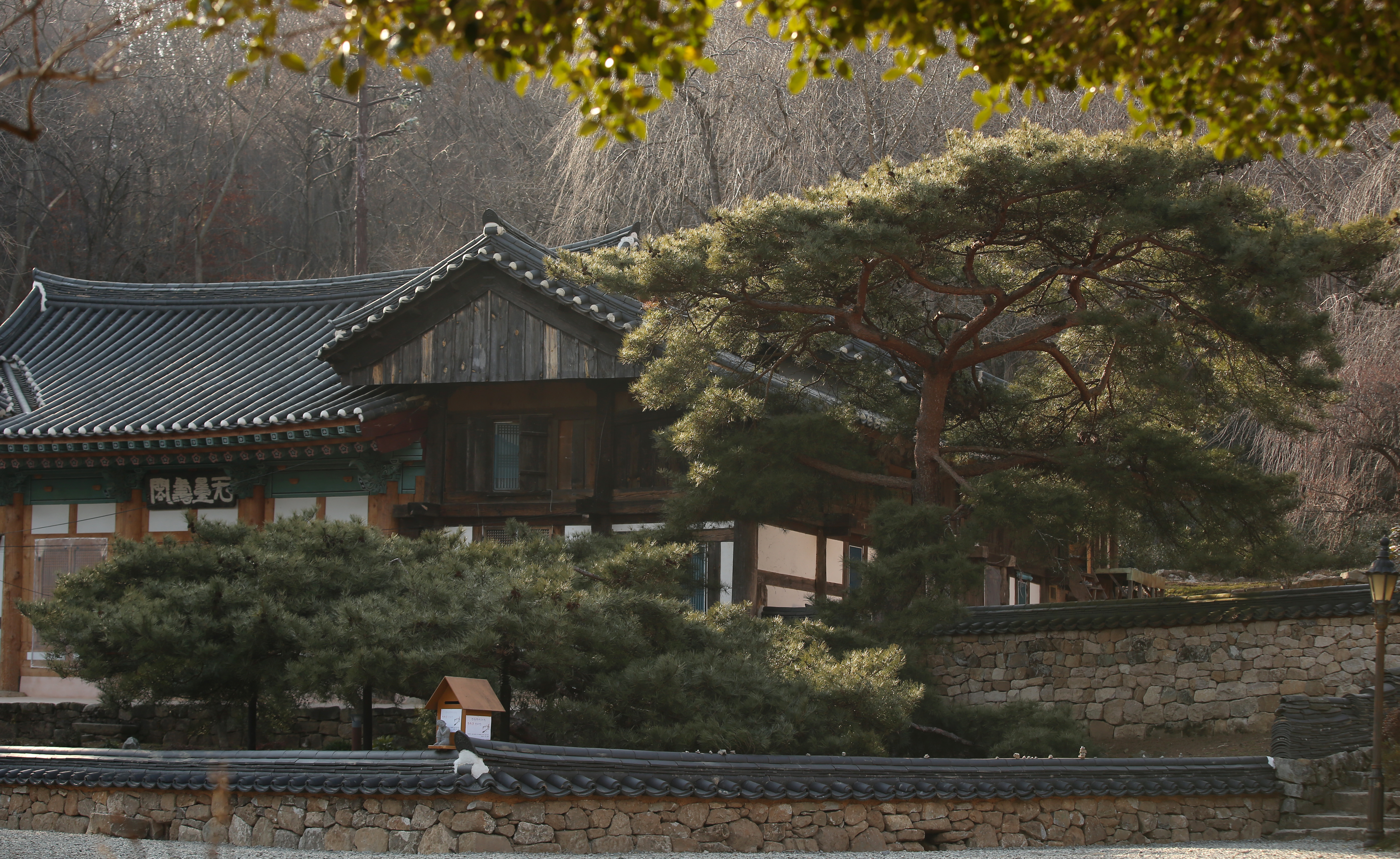
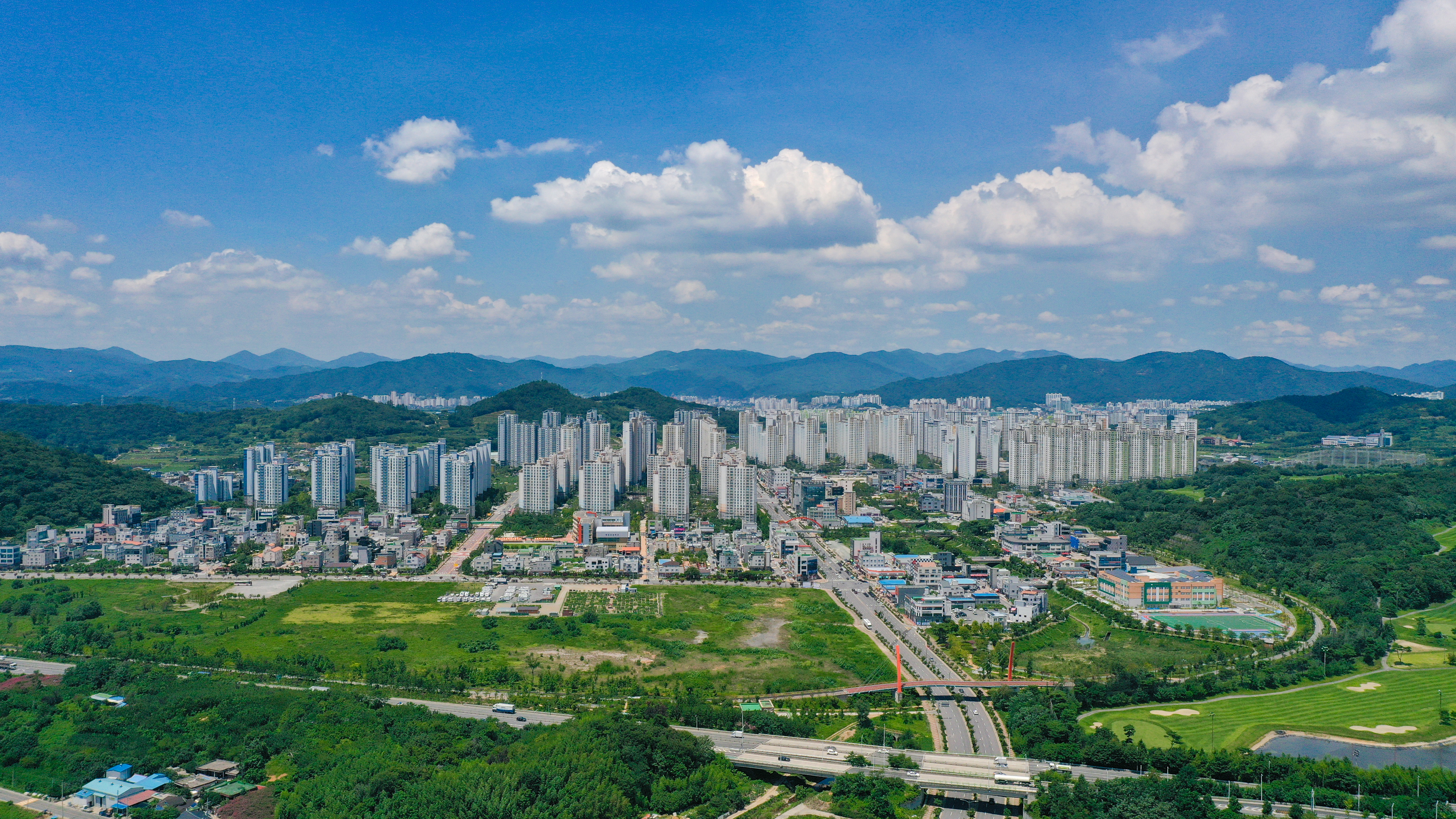
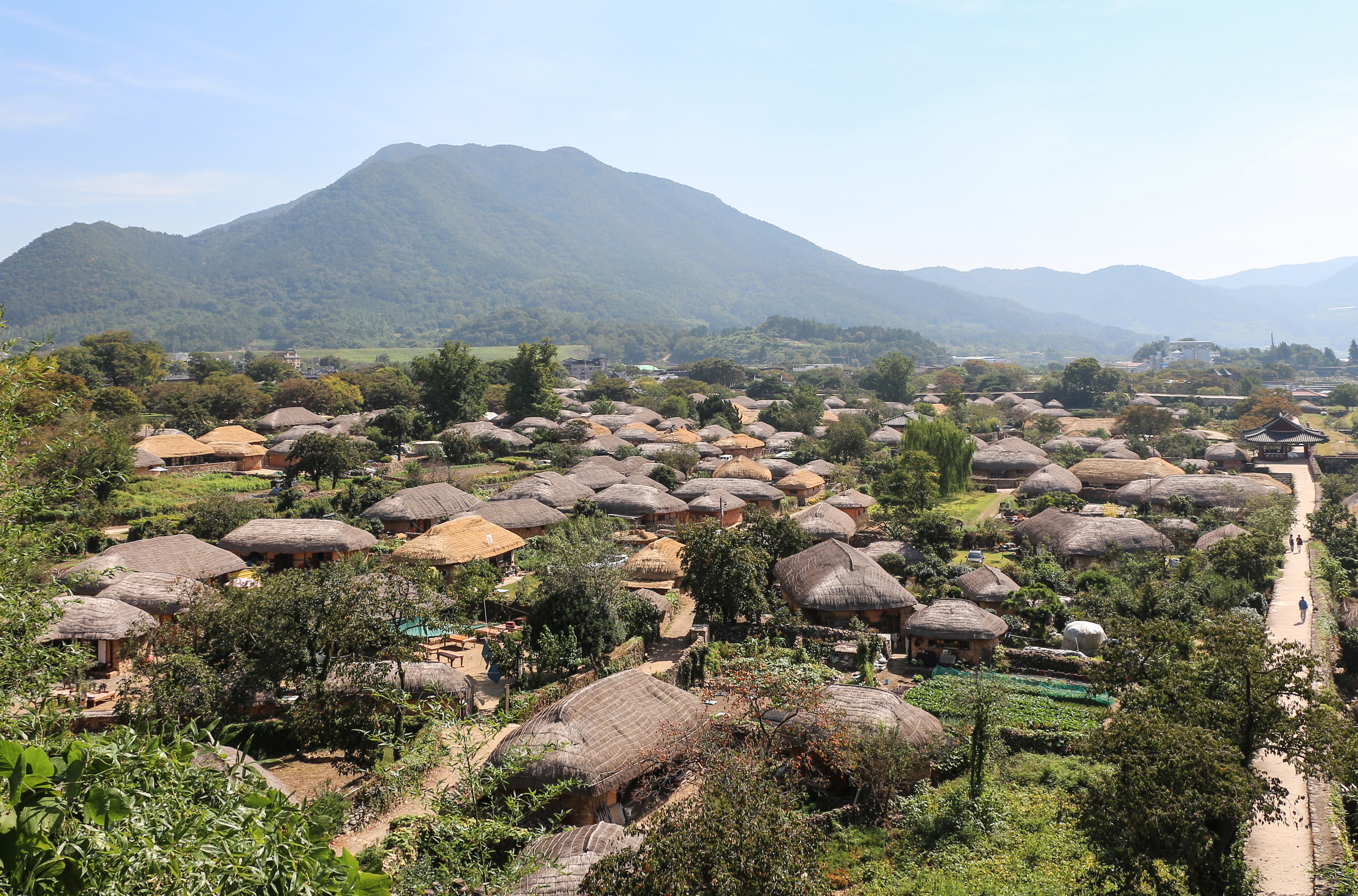
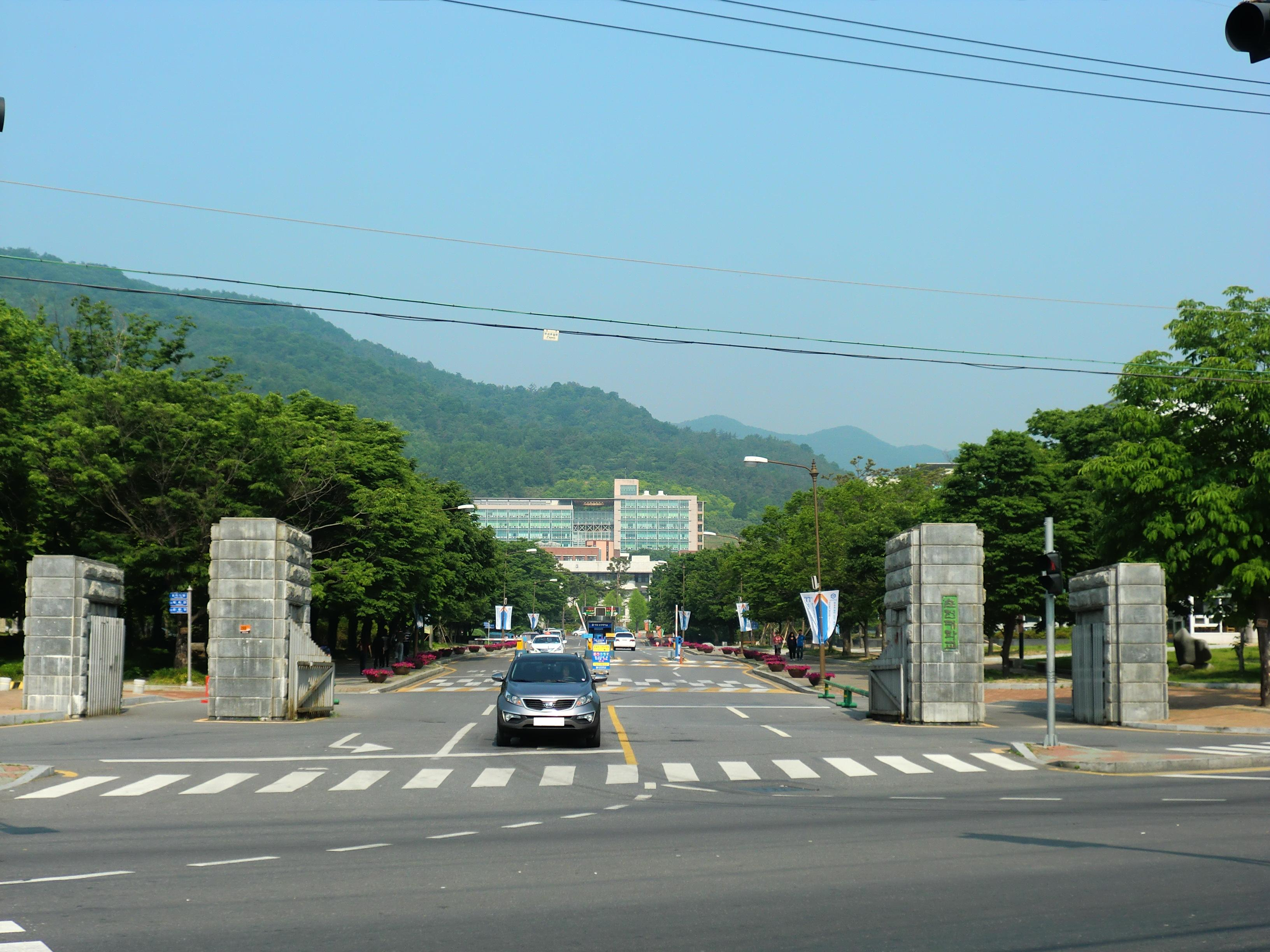
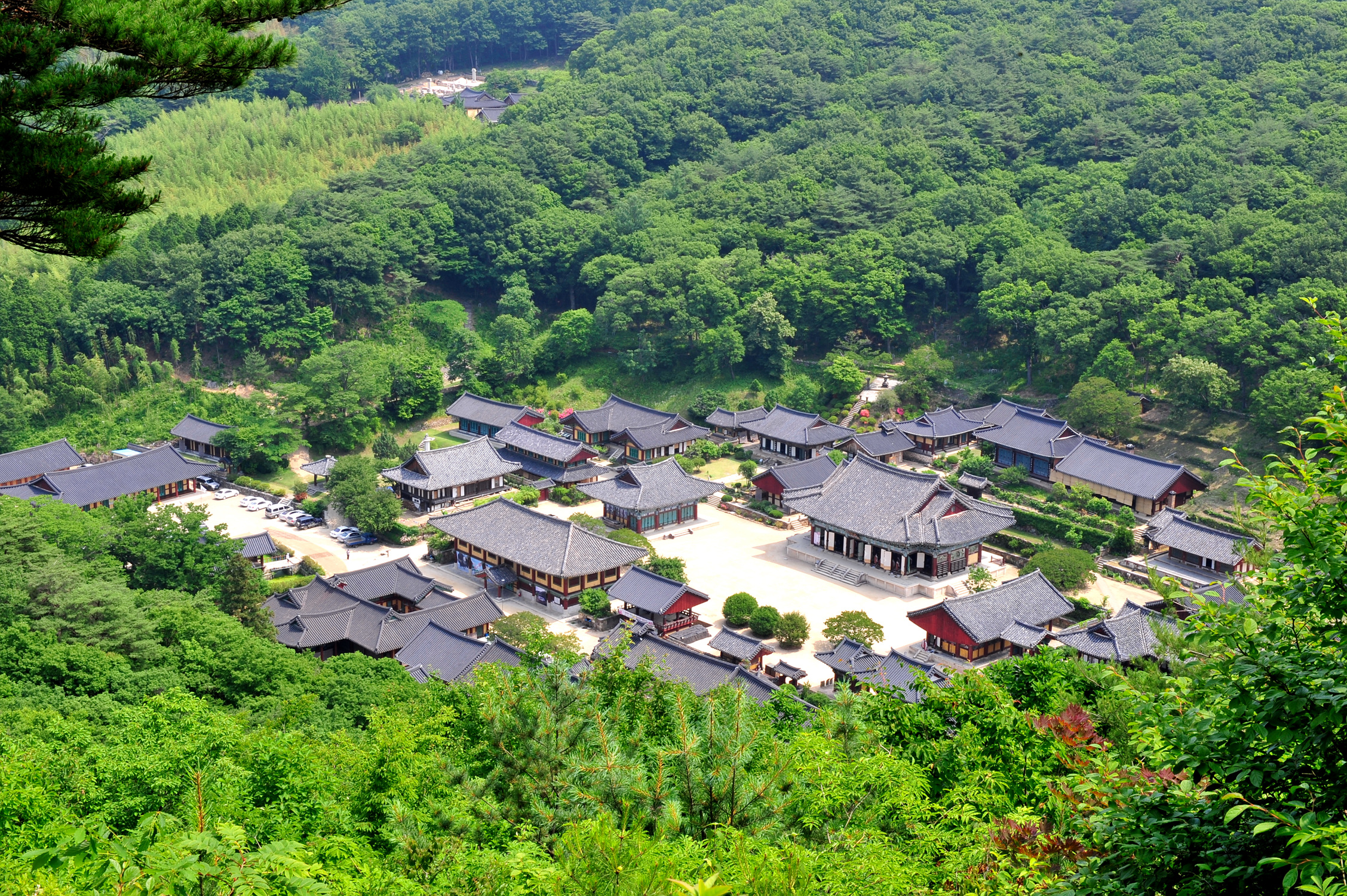
- View of Suncheon Seonamsa Sindae Complex Naganeupseong Sunchon National University Songgwangsa

- Flag

- Location in South Korea
- Coordinates: 34°57′02″N 127°29′15″E
- Country: South Korea
- Region: Honam
- Special metropolitan city: Jeonnam-Gwangju
- Administrative divisions: 1 eup, 10 myeon, 13 dong

Government
  - Mayor: Son Hoon-mo (손훈모)

Area
  - Total: 910.82 km^{2} (351.67 sq mi)

Population (September 2026)
  - Total: 273,175
  - Density: 299.92/km^{2} (776.79/sq mi)
  - Dialect: Jeolla
- Time zone: UTC+9 (Korea Standard Time)
- Area code: +82-61

Korean name
- Hangul: 순천시
- Hanja: 順天市
- RR: Suncheon-si
- MR: Sunch'ŏn-si

Suncheon (Korean: 순천; Korean pronunciation: [sʰun.tɕʰʌn]) is a city in Jeonnam-Gwangju, South Korea, with a registered population of 273,175 as of September 2026. It is located in the southeast of the region and is a scenic agricultural and industrial city, known for tourist attractions, such as Suncheon Bay. The port city of Yeosu is around forty minutes south of Suncheon and Gwangyang twenty minutes to the east of the city.

Part of Suncheon lies within the Gwangyang Bay Free Economic Zone, which includes the Shindeok development district in Suncheon and neighbouring Gwangyang. A proposed merger of Yeosu, Suncheon and Gwangyang was announced in 2007, but the cities remained separate municipalities.

The city was once part of South Jeolla Province, but on July 1, 2026, that province was dissolved and merged with Gwangju into the provincial-level city of Jeonnam-Gwangju. Now, the city is directly managed under Jeonnam-Gwangju.

== History ==
During the Samhan period, the area of present-day Suncheon belonged to the Mahan confederacy. Under Baekje, it was known as Gampyeong-gun, also recorded as Sapyeong or Mupyeong. In 757, during Unified Silla, it was renamed Seungpyeong-gun.

During the Goryeo period, the district was renamed Seungju in 940 and became Seungju-mok in 983. It reverted to Seungpyeong-gun in 1036, was raised again to Seungju-mok in 1309, and was reorganised as Suncheon-bu in 1310. The name Suncheon was first used in this period.

Under the Joseon dynasty, Suncheon became a dohobu (administrative prefecture) in 1413, during the reign of Taejong of Joseon. It was reorganised as Suncheon-gun in 1895. Following Japan's annexation of Korea in 1910, the area was administered within Zenranan Province. On 1 November 1931, Suncheon-myeon was elevated to the status of eup (town).

On 13 August 1949, nine ri of Dosa-myeon and parts of Haeryong-myeon, including Wangji, Jorye and Yeonhyang, were incorporated into Suncheon. The enlarged town became a city on 15 August 1949, while the remaining surrounding areas formed Seungju-gun. On 1 January 1995, the city and Seungju-gun merged to form the present municipality of Suncheon.

On 1 July 2026, South Jeolla Province merged with Gwangju to form Jeonnam-Gwangju, bringing Suncheon under the administration of the new special metropolitan city.

=== Yeosu–Suncheon rebellion ===
On 19 October 1948, soldiers of the South Korean 14th Regiment stationed in Yeosu refused orders to suppress the Jeju uprising and launched a rebellion that spread to Suncheon and surrounding areas. Government forces regained control of the main towns within about a week. Numerous civilians were killed during the fighting and subsequent counterinsurgency operations. South Korean legislation provides for investigation of the events and recognition of victims, covering the period from 19 October 1948 to 1 April 1955.

== Tourism ==
=== 2013 Suncheon Garden Exposition ===
- 2013 Suncheon Garden Expo Korea: The 2013 Suncheon Garden Expo Korea was the first of its kind to be held in Korea. The Expo focused on green industry development such as solar energy, sustainable garden development and electronic transportation. It showcased green technologies, international garden exhibits, and wetland conservation. The Expo grounds, its permanent gardens, arboretum, wetland center, and connecting monorail to Suncheon Bay are maintained for continued tourism. Suncheon hosted the 2023 Suncheonman International Garden Expo from 1 April to 31 October 2023, attracting approximately 9.8 million visitors.

=== Temples ===
- Songgwang Temple: It is one of the Three Jewel Temples of Korea and a popular place for Jinul. The temple is located in Sinpyeong-ri, Songgwang-myeon. It is one of the Sambosachal along with Haein temple of Habcheon and Tongdo Temple of Yangsan. Jinul strived here to renew the tradition of Buddhism 800 years ago. The temple bore 16 state monks in the past. Today, the temple is home for monks from overseas and is a place to study the Buddhist culture of Korea. The temple was first built at the end of Silla Kingdom and named Gilsang Temple. It was then renamed in the Goryeo dynasty under the reign of Myeongjong, to Songgwang Temple. Reconstructions were done after it was burnt down in the Joseon period, but was severely damaged again in 1948 and 1951. At present, 33 complexes have been restored after 8 reconstruction projects from 1984 to 1988. The temple has a total of 26 cultural assets, including 17 national cultural assets and 9 local ones.
- Seonamsa: Seonamsa of Mount Jogye is located in Jukak-ri, Seungju-eup, Suncheon. In the Baekje Kingdom, Adohwasang had first built a small temple in the mountain and named it Biroam of Cheongnyangsan Mountain. The temple was named Seonamsa later in the Silla Kingdom by state monk Doseon. Seonamsa is known to be a mixture of the various sects of Buddhism of the Goryeo dynasty. Cheontaejong was established here 900 years ago by Ui Cheon and the monk's heirs have been carried down to the present age. Seonamsa, like Songgwangsa, is a library for studies of Korean Buddhist culture. A total of 18 cultural assets are found here, including 7 treasures and 11 local cultural assets.
- Cheonjaam, Ssanghyangsu: Belongs to the Chinese juniper family, and is technically named Juniperus Chinensi Limme. The height is 12.5 m and the circumference is 3.98m. The tree is about 700 years old. According to the legend, the cane used by a Buddhist on his way back from China had grown into the tree. The tree is uniquely twisted form.
- Natural monument No, 88 (designated on December 3, 1962).
- Ieub-ri, Songgwang-myeon (Songgwang Temple).
- Area 600 pyeong (approximately 1,983 m^{2}).

=== Castles ===
- Nagan Castle, a Joseon-era walled town in the former South Jeolla Province. It is well preserved and has many festivals like the Namdo food festival.
- Suncheon Japanese Castle, a Japanese castle built during the Japanese invasions of Korea.

=== Mountains ===
- Jogyesan: The mountain where Songgwang Temple and Seonamsa are located.
- Geumjeonsan: Surrounding north of Nagan Castle.
- Bonghwasan: The nearest mountain from the center of the city. There's Jukdobong Park having a lookout pavilion.

=== Parks ===
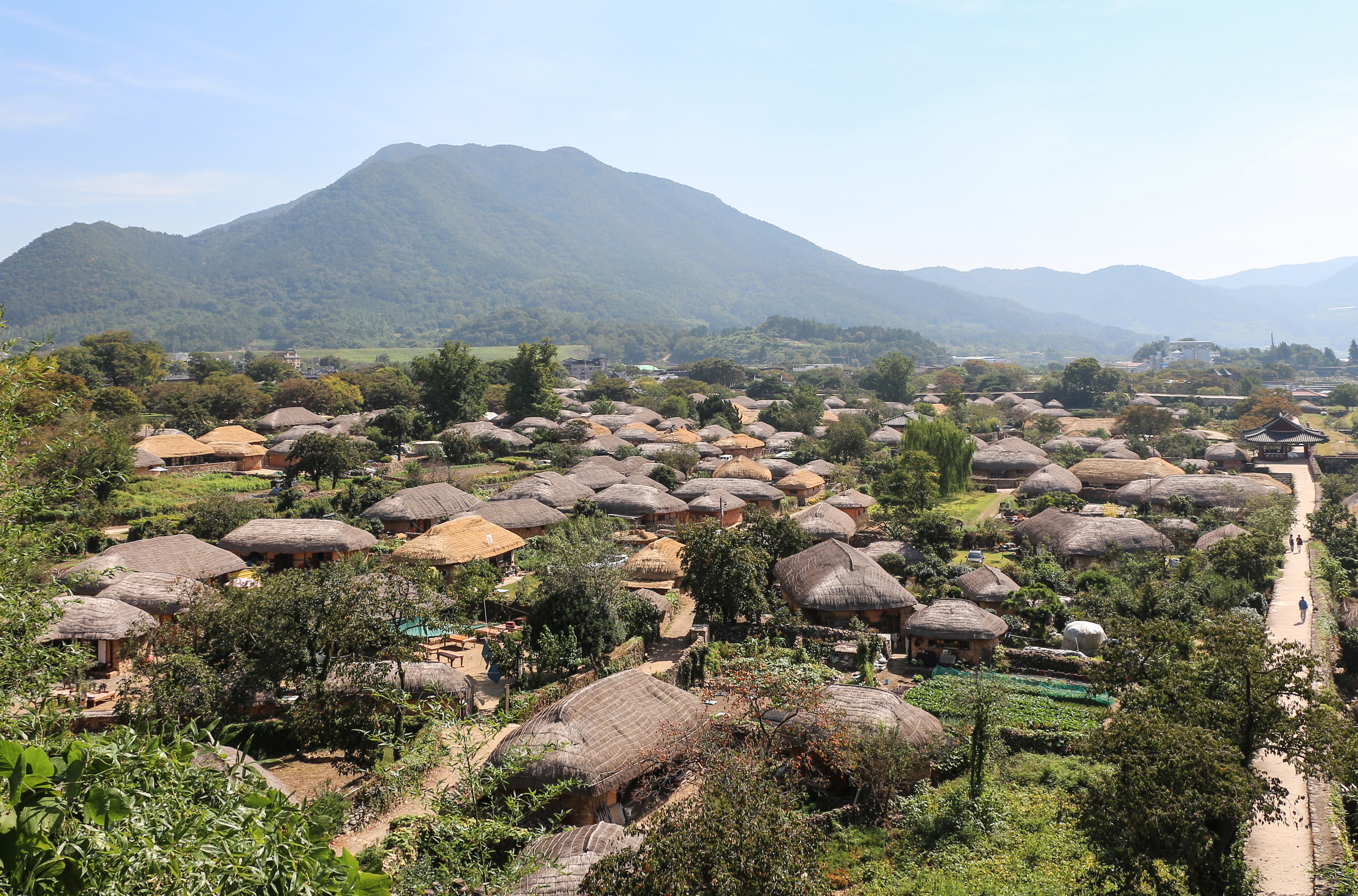
Naganeupseong Folk Village

- Suncheon Bay Ecological Park: The world's fifth biggest tideland, featuring reed beds and there many types of birds. The reserve was designated as a preservation zone by the Ministry of Oceans and Fisheries in 2003.
- Suncheonman Bay National Garden: This garden is home to over 790,000 trees and was stablished on a plot of 1.112 km^{2} (0.429 sq mi) to help protect Suncheon Bay.
- Goindol Park, a dolmen park in Hwasun, Suncheon: Gochang, Hwasun and Ganghwa Dolmen Sites were designated as a World Heritage Site by UNESCO in 2000.
- Suncheon Open Film Location: Drama film set located in the neighborhood of Jorye-dong. This set was created to film movies and dramas in 2006. The village is split in three eras: 1950s Suncheon, 1960s Seoul Bongcheong-dong Village and 1970s Seoul suburb.
- Naganeupseong Folk Village: a historic village representing the traditional lifestyle and cultural landscape in the Joseon Dynasty. It was originally and administrative town and has preserved traditional elements such as a fortress, government buildings and private houses.

=== Museums ===
- The Deep-Rooted Tree Museum (순천시립 뿌리깊은나무 박물관) is located close to Naganeupseong Walled Town. A collection of Korean famous magazine's founder, Han Chang-gi; as well as artifacts from the Bronze Age to the present era are displayed. The museum also features 6,500 articles including Korean vintage literature books, folk arts, ceramics, and traditional items of clothing from the Three Kingdoms era, in which visitors could sense the ancient-modern Korean culture and lifestyles.

=== Filming locations ===
- Jorye-dong, which is located in Suncheon is the largest filming site in Korea that preserves the 60s and 80s buildings. Visitors could experience vintage village life in the 1960s and 1980s, as there are 200 houses with 39,669.6 m². A remake drama written by Kim Soo-Hyeon <Love & Ambition> starring actor Lee Byung-hun and actress Soo-ae was filmed in Jorye-dong, Suncheon. Other hit movies and dramas such as <You are far Away> (2008) and <Giant> (2010) were also shot in the same city.
- In 2021, the Korea Tourism Organization released a music video in collaboration with Korea's famous hip-hop label AOMG and Higher Music to produce a soundtrack to highlight the attractions and cultural heritage in Korea. The clips of the music video were filmed in Suncheon, which demonstrates the coexistence of tradition and contemporary lifestyles In Korea.

== Slogans ==
On its website, Suncheon is dubbed by its city council as the City of Beautiful People, and its slogan is "Aha! Suncheon."

== Twin towns – sister cities ==
Suncheon is twinned with:

- Antalya, Turkey
- Columbia, United States
- Izumi, Japan
- Kragujevac, Serbia
- Nantes, France
- Taiyuan, China

== Notable people from Suncheon ==
- Kai (Real Name: Kim Jong-in, 김종인), singer, rapper, dancer, actor, model and K-pop idol, member of K-pop boygroup Exo, the sub unit Exo-K and the K-pop Superboygroup SuperM
- Lee Seul-bi (이슬비), South Korean actress
- Kim Ok-vin, South Korean actress
- Hyunseung (Real Name: Jang Hyun-seung, 장현승), singer, dancer and K-pop idol, former member of K-pop boygroup Beast.
- Gongchan (Real Name: Gong Chan-sik, 공찬식), singer, dancer, model, actor, MC and K-pop idol, member of K-pop boygroup B1A4
- Haseul (Real Name: Cho Ha-seul, 조하슬), singer, dancer and K-pop idol, member of K-pop girlgroups Loona, Loona 1/3, and Artms
- Chaeyeon (Real Name: Jung Chae-yeon, 정채연), singer, dancer, model, actress and K-pop idol, former member of the K-pop girlgroups DIA and I.O.I
- Yoon Shi-yoon (Real Name: Yoon Dong-gu, 윤동구), South Korean actor
- Miryo (Real Name: Jo Mi-hye, 조미혜), singer-songwriter, rapper, dancer, record producer and K-pop idol, member of K-pop girlgroup Brown Eyed Girls
- Eyedi (Real name: Nam Yujin, 남유진), singer, songwriter, and actress under Bace Camp Studios, former contestant on Mixnine
- Dex (Real name: Kim Jin-young, 김진영), entertainer, actor, YouTuber and former ROKN UDT soldier.

== Schools ==
- Korea Baduk High School
- Suncheon Hyocheon High School

== See also ==
- List of cities in South Korea
- Geography of South Korea
