= Janggundo =

Island in Yeosu Bay, Yeosu, South Korea

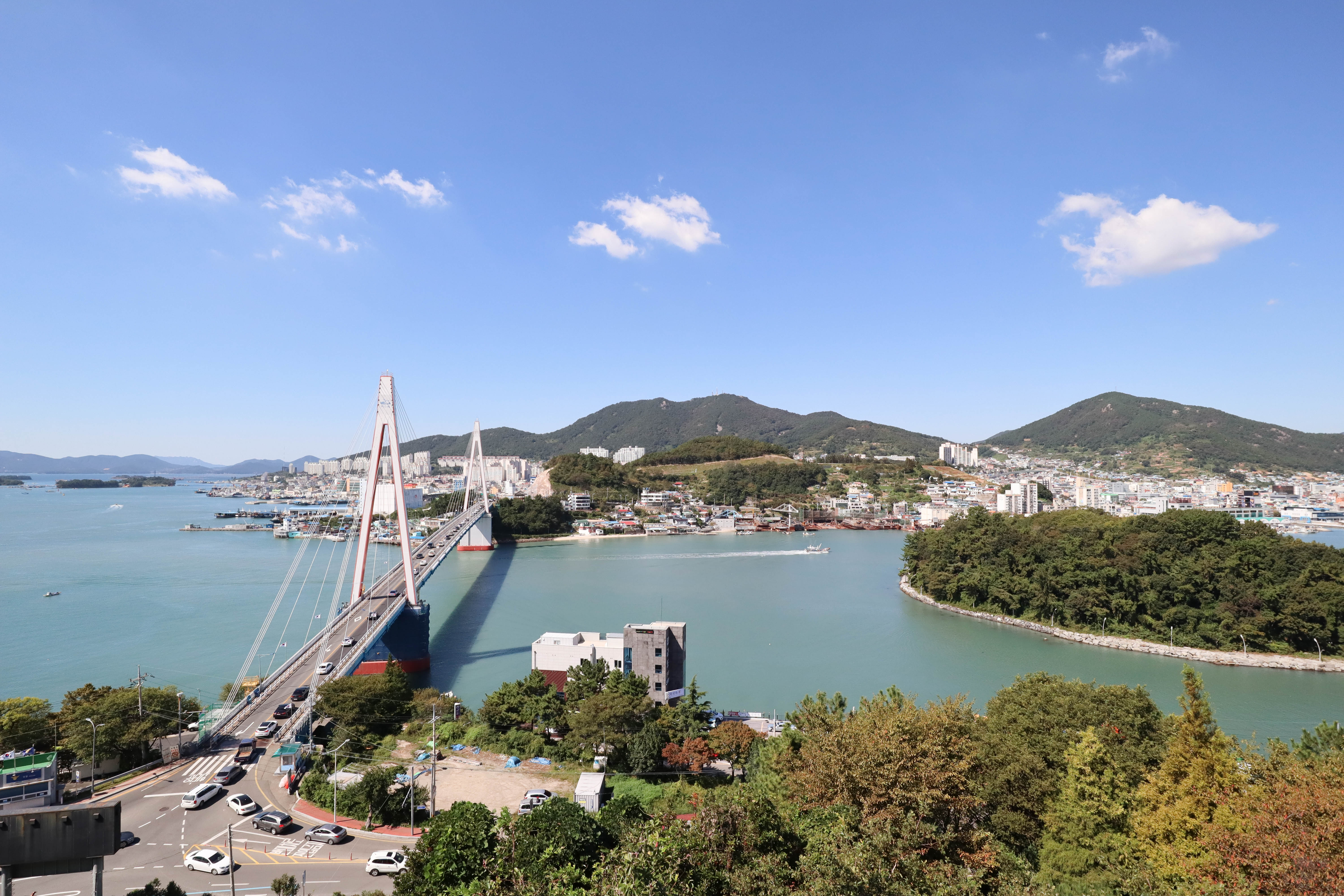
- The island (right, 2018)
- Interactive map of Janggundo
- Other names: Chamgyeongdo, Daeseom

Geography
- Coordinates: 34°44′00″N 127°44′09″E
- Area: 17,851 m^{2} (192,150 sq ft)
- Coastline: 600 m (2000 ft)

Janggundo (Korean: 장군도; Hanja: 將軍島; lit. 'General Island') is a small uninhabited island located in the middle of Yeosu Harbor in Jungang-dong, Yeosu, Jeonnam-Gwangju, South Korea. The island has also gone by the name Chamgyeongdo (참경도; 斬鯨島) and Daeseom (대섬; lit. 'bamboo island'). It is roughly circular, and has a coastline of 600 meters (2,000 ft) and area of 17,851 m^{2} (192,150 ft^{2}).

While the island is uninhabited, fishermen occasionally ride their boats to the island, and ferries have sometimes moved people over there for sightseeing. However, all ferry services to the island were discontinued in 2015, making the island difficult to access for people who do not own a boat.

The island gets its name from a naval officer who was associated with the island. He built defensive barriers on and around the island for protection against wokou (Japanese pirates) around 1497. There is a legend that three dragons are constantly fighting over ownership of the island. Each dragon is represented by nearby geographical features: the mountain Yeamsan, the island Dolsando, and the island Gyeonghodo.

The area was being gradually eroded due to fast currents. To slow this process, the city built a stone wall around its coast in 2005.

== Gallery ==
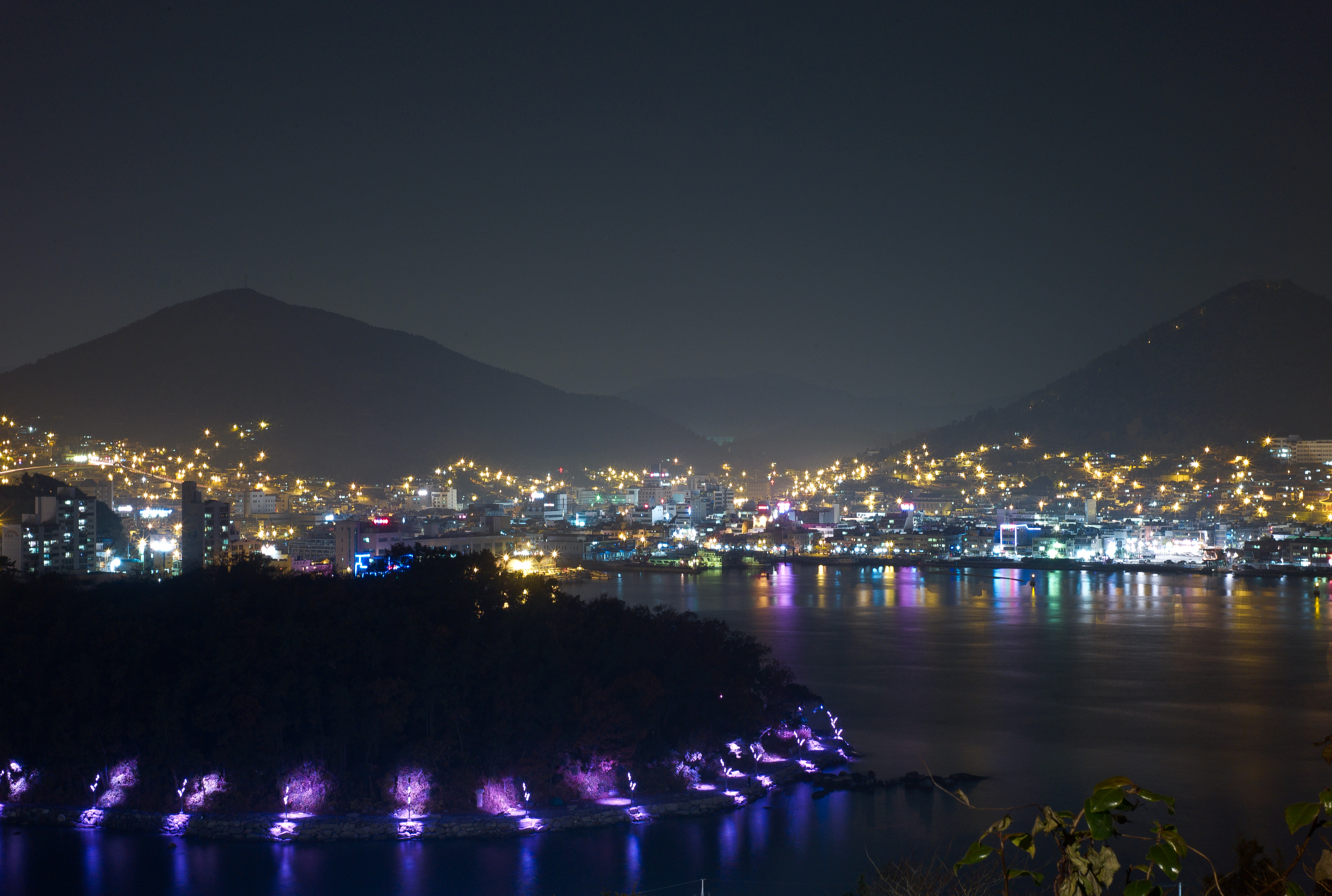
The island, lit up at night (2010)

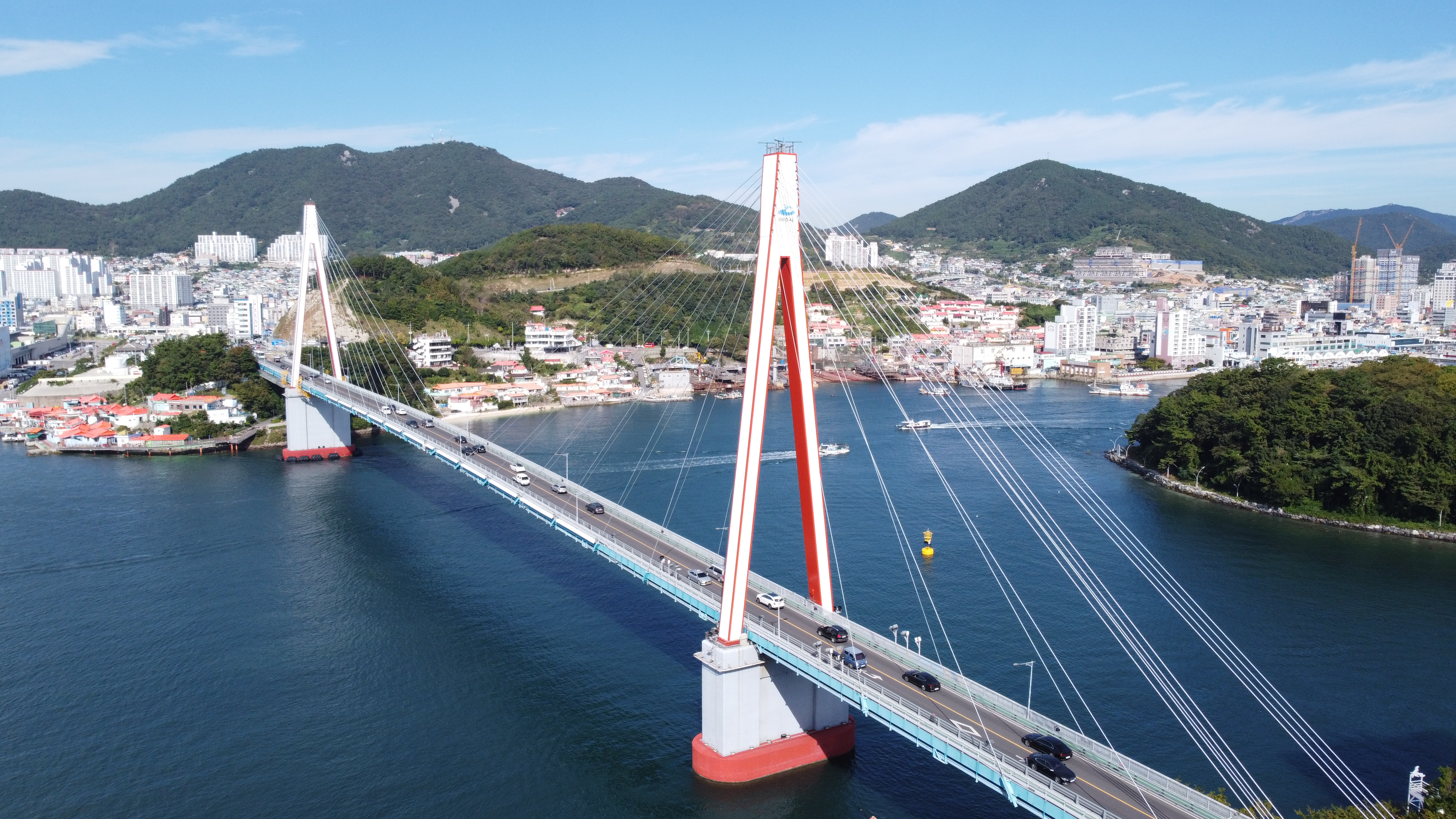
The Dolsan Bridge, with Janggundo visible in the background (2022)

== See also ==
- Odongdo – another island in Yeosu, although with a park and bridge
- Jangdo – another park island with a bridge
