= Dolsan =

Town in Yeosu, South Korea

Coordinates: 34°38′16″N 127°45′43″E

- Hangul: 돌산읍
- Hanja: 突山邑
- RR: Dolsan-eup
- MR: Tolsan-ŭp

Dolsan-eup (Korean: 돌산읍) is a town in the Yeosu city in South Korea. It is located on the island Dolsando.

Dolsan Park is located in this area. From the park, one can ride the Yeosu Maritime Cable Car over to the mainland.

== Villages ==
The following villages are listed as administrative divisions:

| English name | Korean name | Notes |
|---|---|---|
| Gunnae-ri | 군내리 | Town office |
| Geumbong-ri | 금봉리 | |
| Geumseong-ri | 금성리 | |
| Dunjeon-ri | 둔전리 | |
| Seodeok-ri | 서덕리 | |
| Sinbok-ri | 신복리 | |
| Udu-ri | 우두리 | 3rd city hall |
| Yullim-ri | 율림리 | |
| Jukpo-ri | 죽포리 | |
| Pyeongsa-ri | 평사리 | |

== Transportation ==
Dolsan town has no expressways and two national highways, No. 17 and No. 77.

It has 3 bridges: Dolsan Bridge, Geobukseon Bridge, and Hwatae Bridge.
