= Ansan Neighborhood Park =

Public park in Yeosu, South Korea

- Type: Public park
- Location: Hak-dong, Yeosu, South Jeolla Province, South Korea
- Coordinates: 34.75939°N 127.65855°E
- Area: 4.5097 hectares (11.144 acres)

Ansan Neighborhood Park (Korean: 안산근린공원; Hanja: 安山近鄰公園) is a public park in Hak-dong, Yeosu, South Jeolla Province, South Korea. It first opened to the public on June 25, 2019. It has an area of 45,097 square meters (485,420 sq ft).

The land the park occupies is on a hill. The land had actually been set aside for the park since April 11, 1977, but development stalled on converting it into a park for around 40 years. Finally, in 2014, plans were approved to begin work on the park. Construction began on June 25, 2018, and was completed by May in the following year. The project cost a total of 4.8 billion won, and resulted in 800 m (2,600 ft) of walking paths, two public squares, two rest areas, five parking lots with 89 spaces, exercise equipment, and a pavilion. Work began in December 2020 to increase the number of parking spaces to 126.
