= Geobukseon Park =

Park in Yeosu, South Korea

- Location: Hak-dong, Yeosu, South Jeolla Province, South Korea
- Coordinates: 34.76137°N 127.66695°E
- Area: 4.863 hectares (12.02 acres)
- Established: 1992
- Website: VisitKorea.or.kr (in Korean)

Geobukseon Park (Korean: 거북선공원; lit. Turtle Ship Park) is a public park in Hak-dong, Yeosu, South Jeolla Province, South Korea. It was founded in 1992, and has an area of 48,630 square meters (523,400 sq ft).

There is an artificial lake in the center of the park that is in the shape of a turtle. There is a fountain in the lake. In the spring, cherry blossom trees bloom in the park. There is an outdoor stage for performances, as well as a turtle ship sculpture and a dolmen. There is also a gym in the park, with various sports facilities.
