= Hyangiram =

Buddhist temple in Yeosu, South Korea

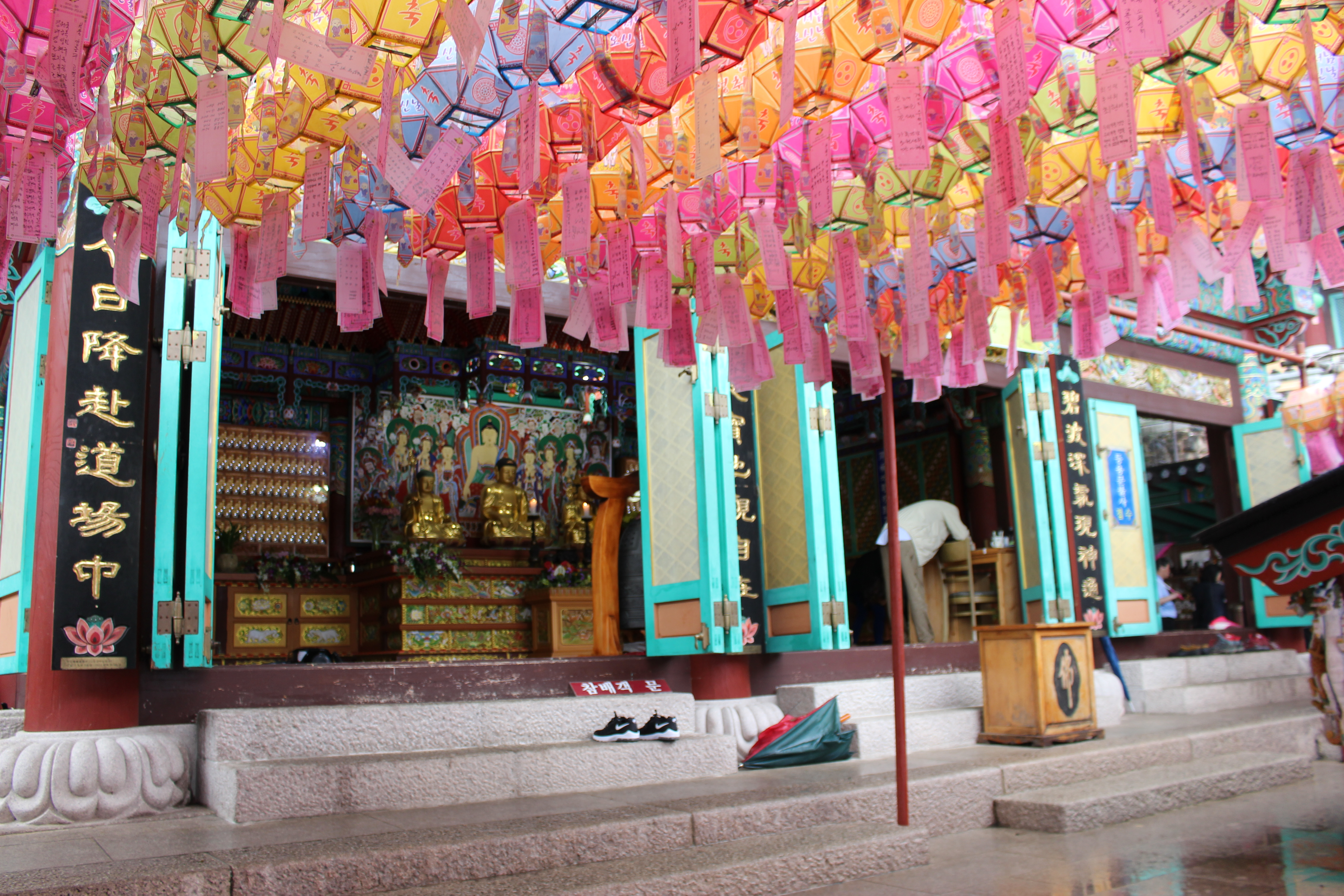
- Wontongbojeon, one of the buildings in the temple complex (2017)

Religion
- Affiliation: Korean Buddhism
- Province: South Jeolla Province

Location
- Country: South Korea
- Interactive map of Hyangiram
- Coordinates: 34.59160°N 127.80391°E

Architecture
- Founder: Wonhyo
- Established: 644

Hyangiram (Korean: 향일암; Hanja: 向日庵) is a hermitage and Buddhist temple in Yeosu, South Jeolla Province, South Korea. It was built in 644 during the Baekje period, by the notable Buddhist monk Wonhyo. It is Cultural Asset No. 40 of South Jeolla Province.

It is one of four Buddhist hermitages on the peninsula. It was originally named Wontongam (원통암; 圓通庵).

== Gallery ==
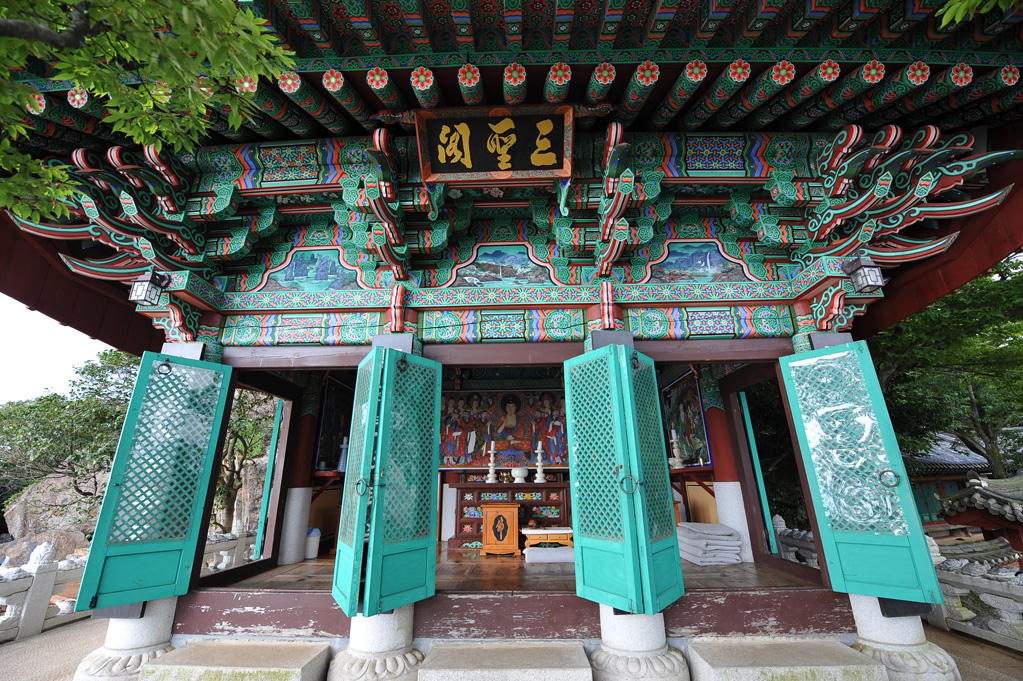
Another building (2010)

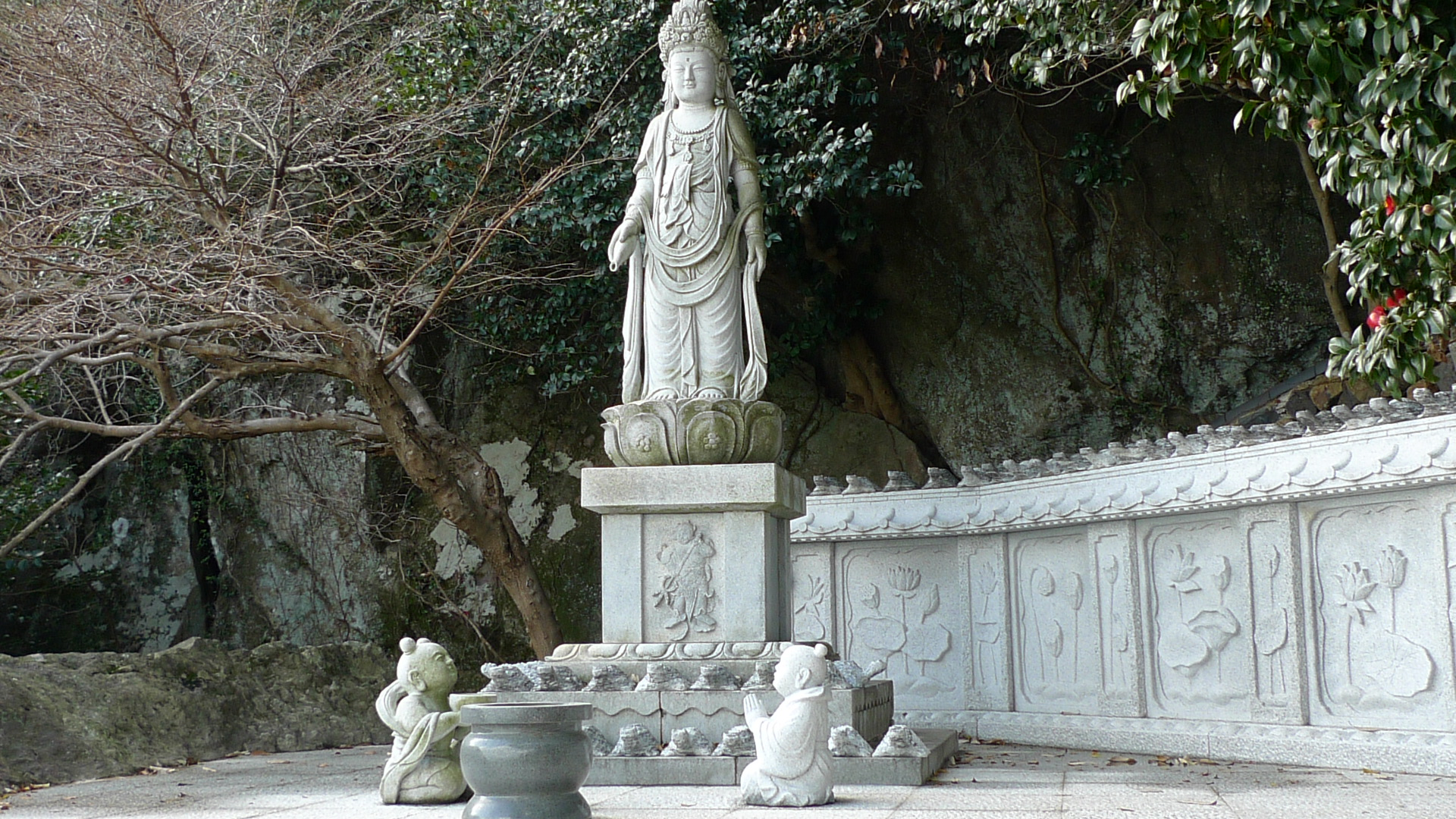
Statue (2009)

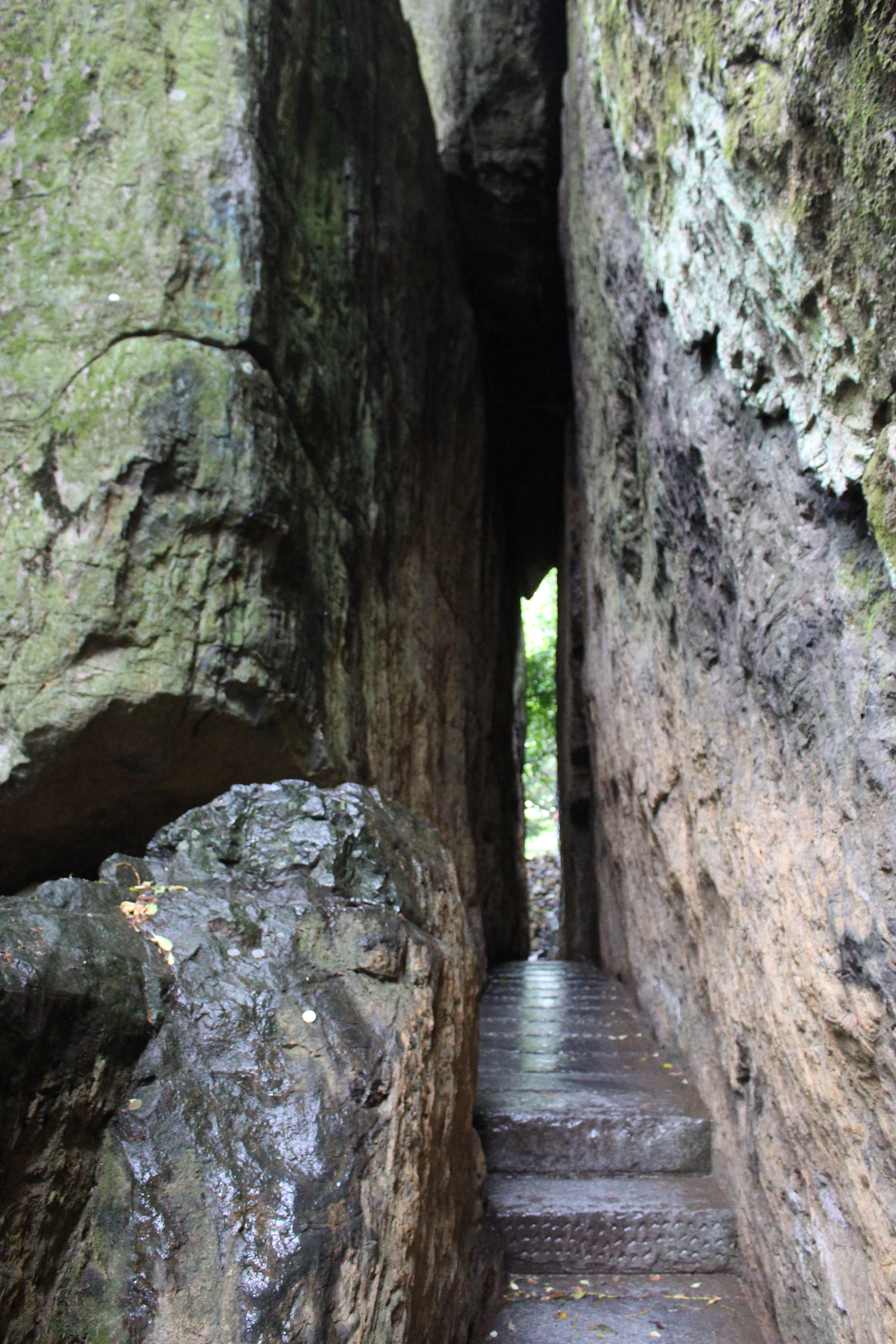
Haetalmun, a narrow walkway one must pass to reach the temple (2017)

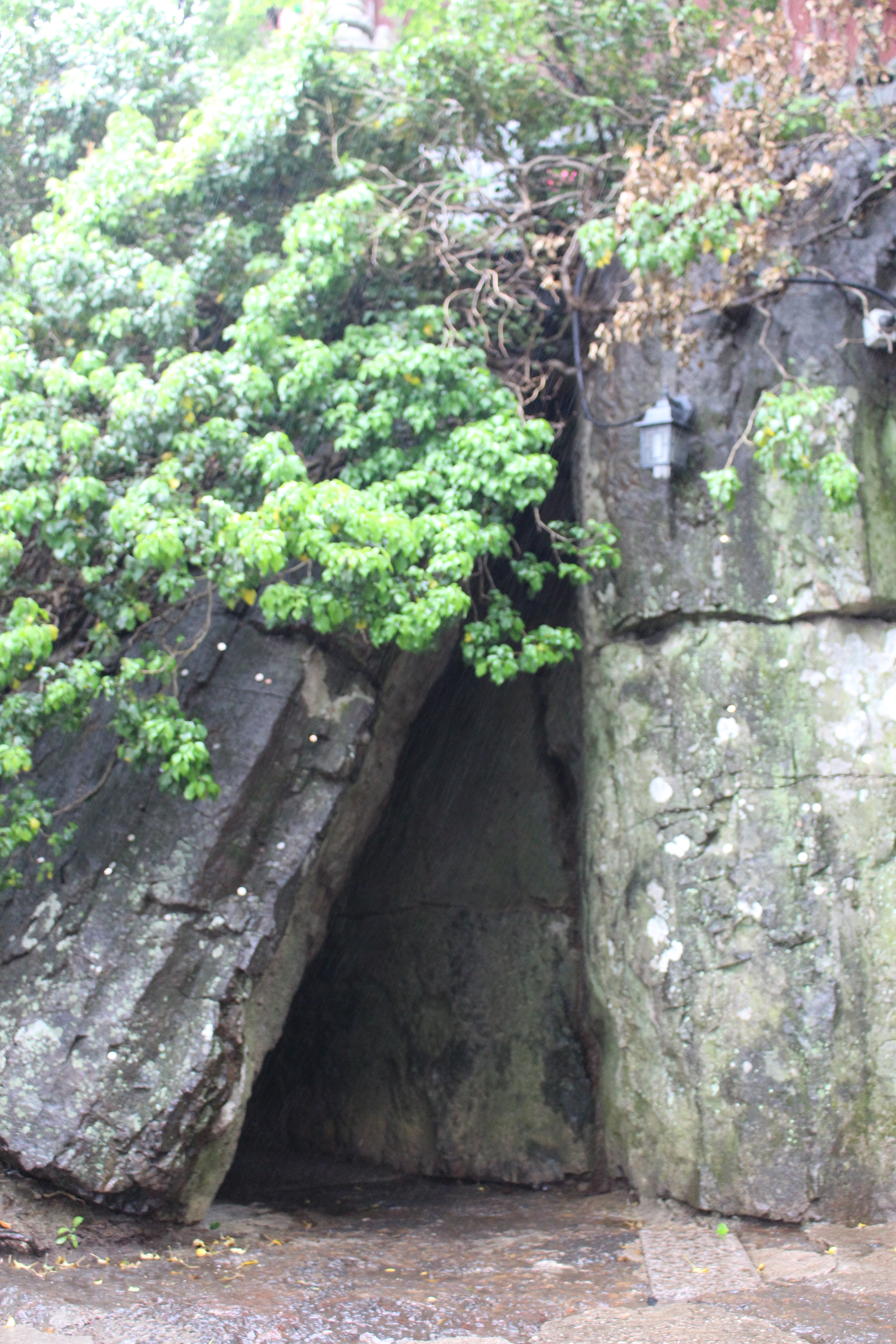
Banyamun, another narrow walkway (2017)

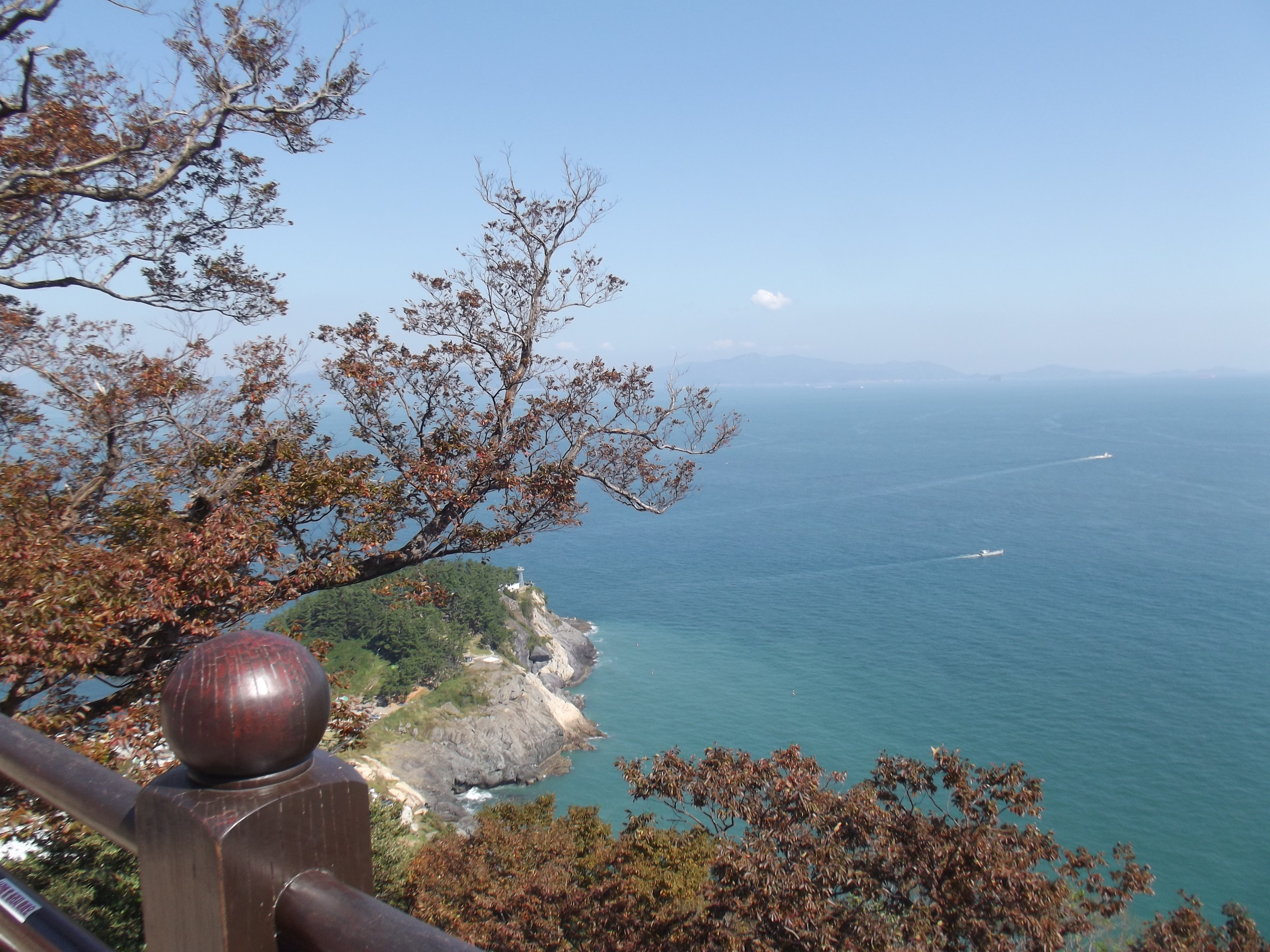
View from the temple (2014)

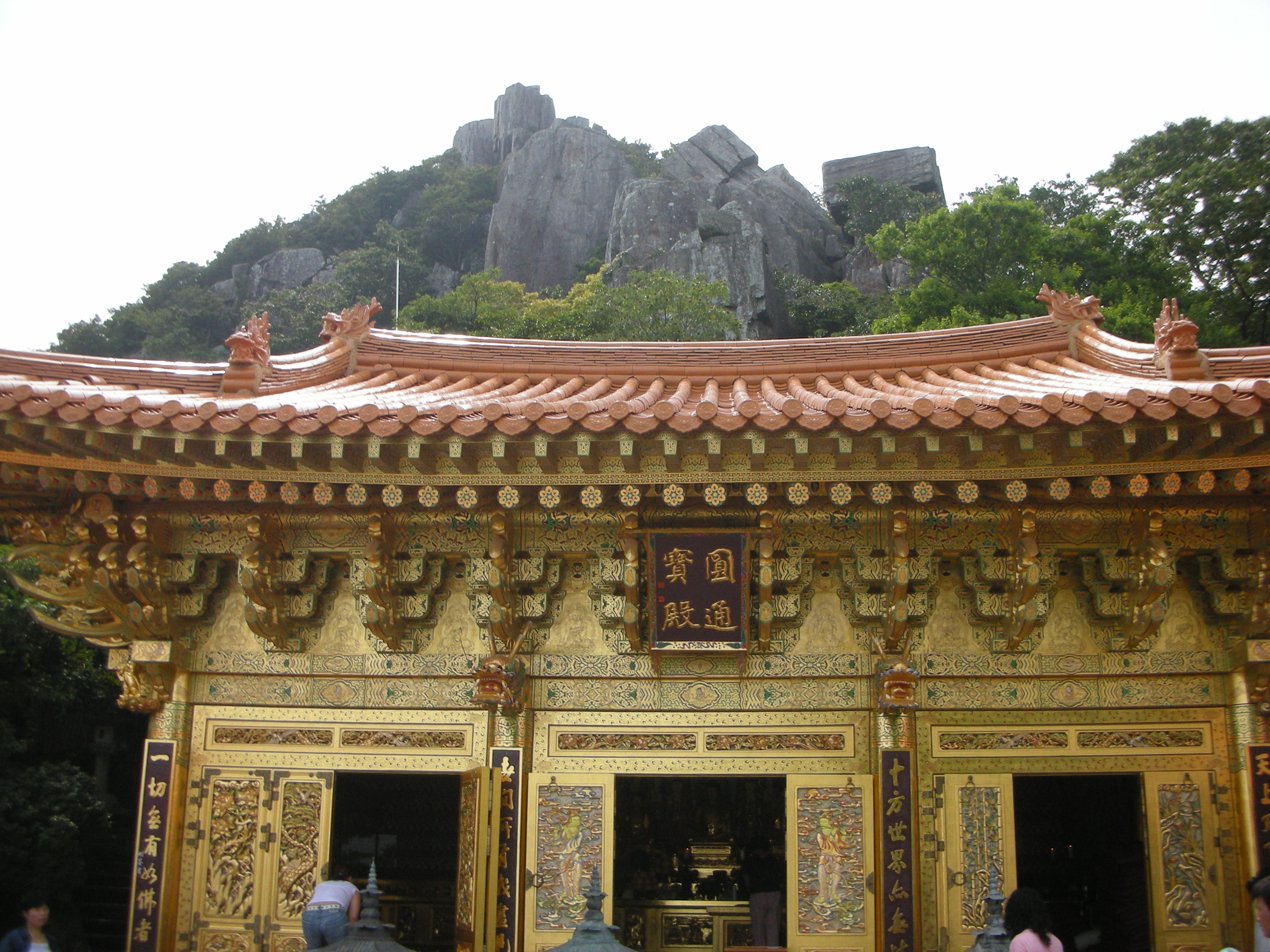
A golden building in the temple (2009)
