= Odongdo =

Island in Yeosu, South Korea

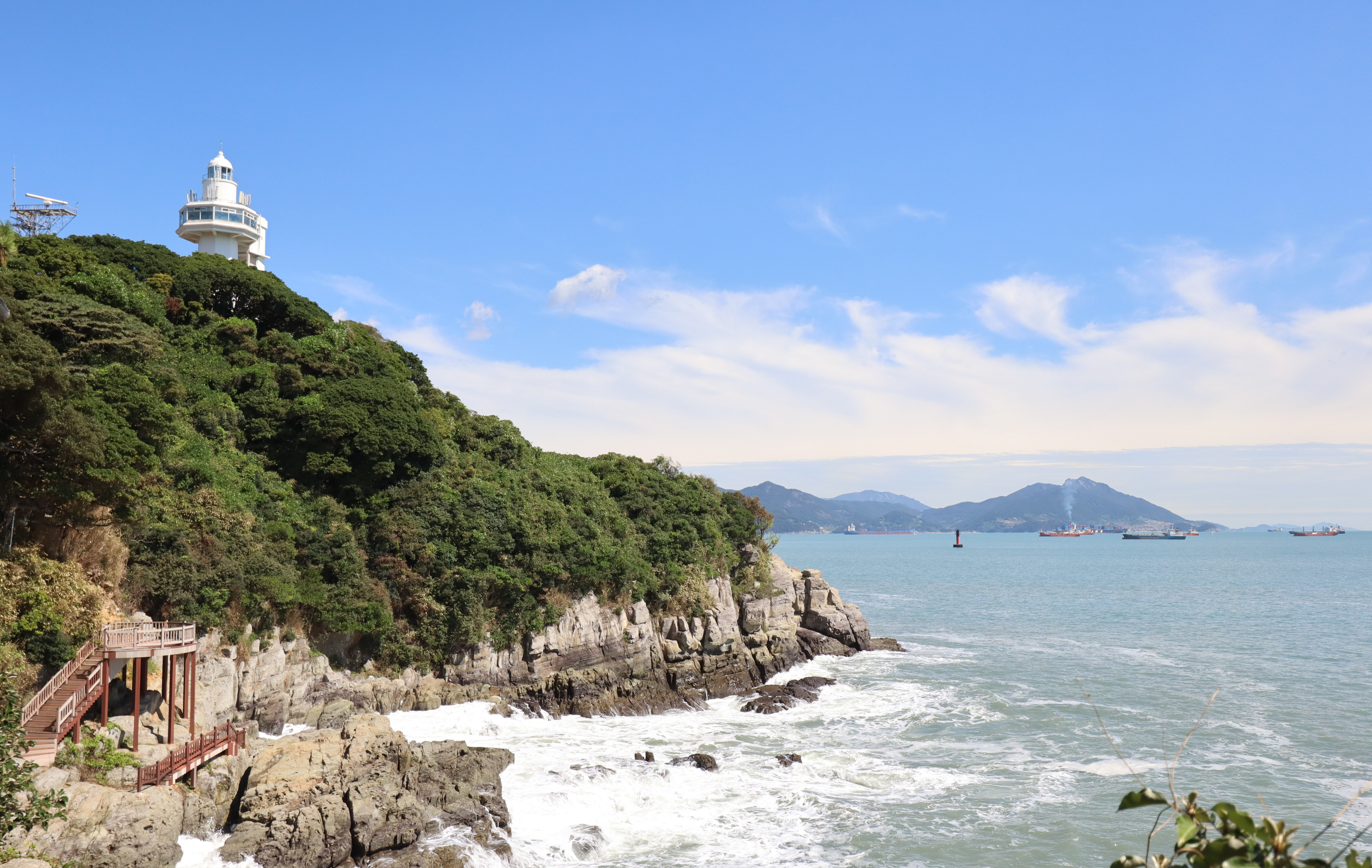
- Part of the island's coastline (2018)
- Interactive map of Odongdo

Geography
- Location: Yeosu, Jeonnam-Gwangju, South Korea
- Coordinates: 34.74485°N 127.76633°E
- Area: 0.13 km^{2} (0.050 sq mi)
- Coastline: 14 km (8.7 mi)

Odongdo (Korean: 오동도; Hanja: 梧桐島) is an island in Sujeong-dong, Yeosu, Jeonnam-Gwangju, South Korea. The island is a part of the Hallyeohaesang National Park. It is located 1 kilometer (0.62 mi) away from the mainland. There is a bridge that goes from the mainland to the island.

The island has an area of 0.13 km^{2} (0.050 mi^{2}), and a coastline of 14 km (8.7 mi). The island is a popular tourist spot, as it is host to a large number of varied plants, and has numerous scenic cliffs and caves.

The bridge was built in 1935, during the Japanese colonial period. It is 768 m (2,520 ft) long.

== Gallery ==
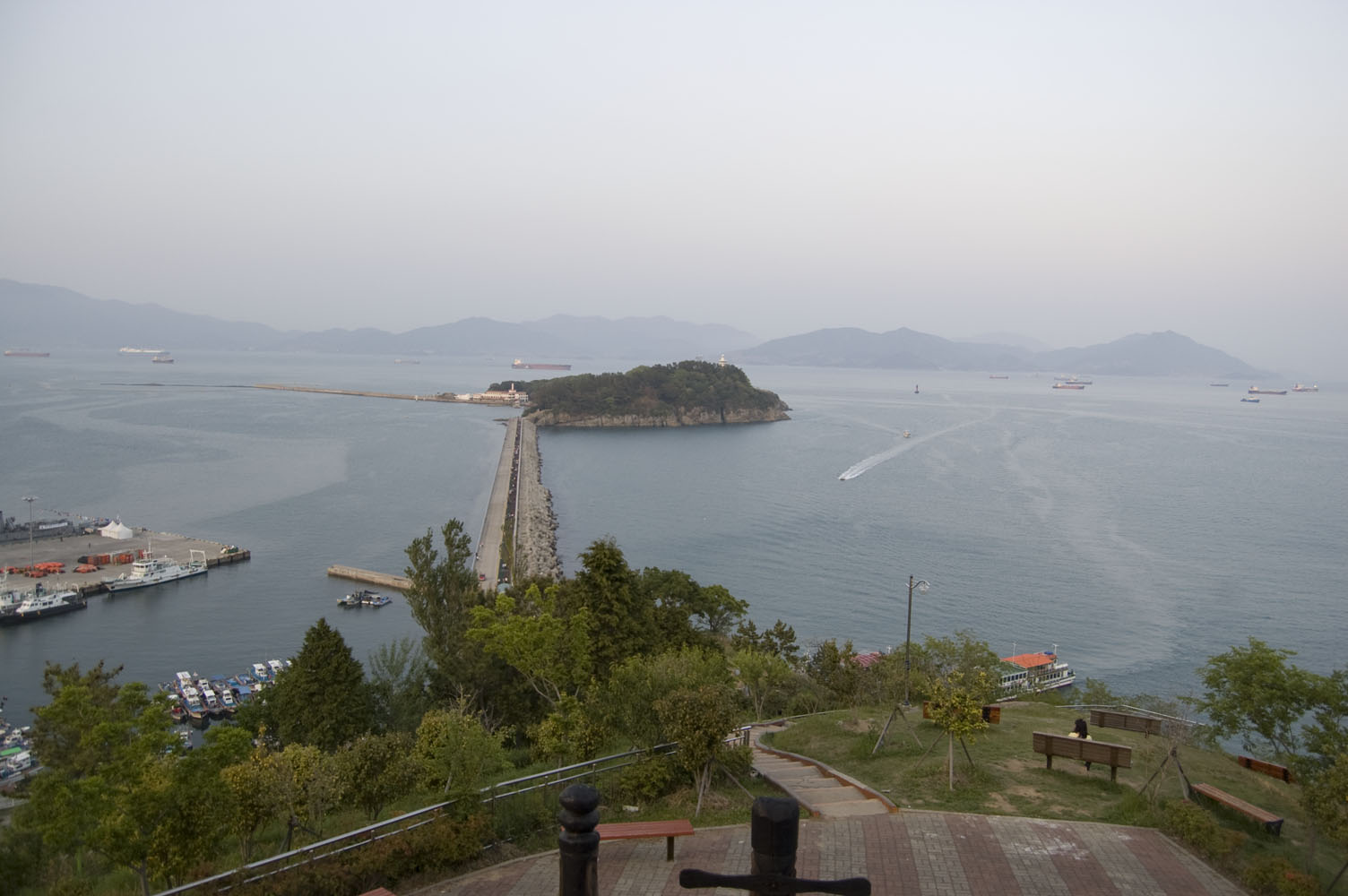
View of the island and bridge from the mainland (2009)

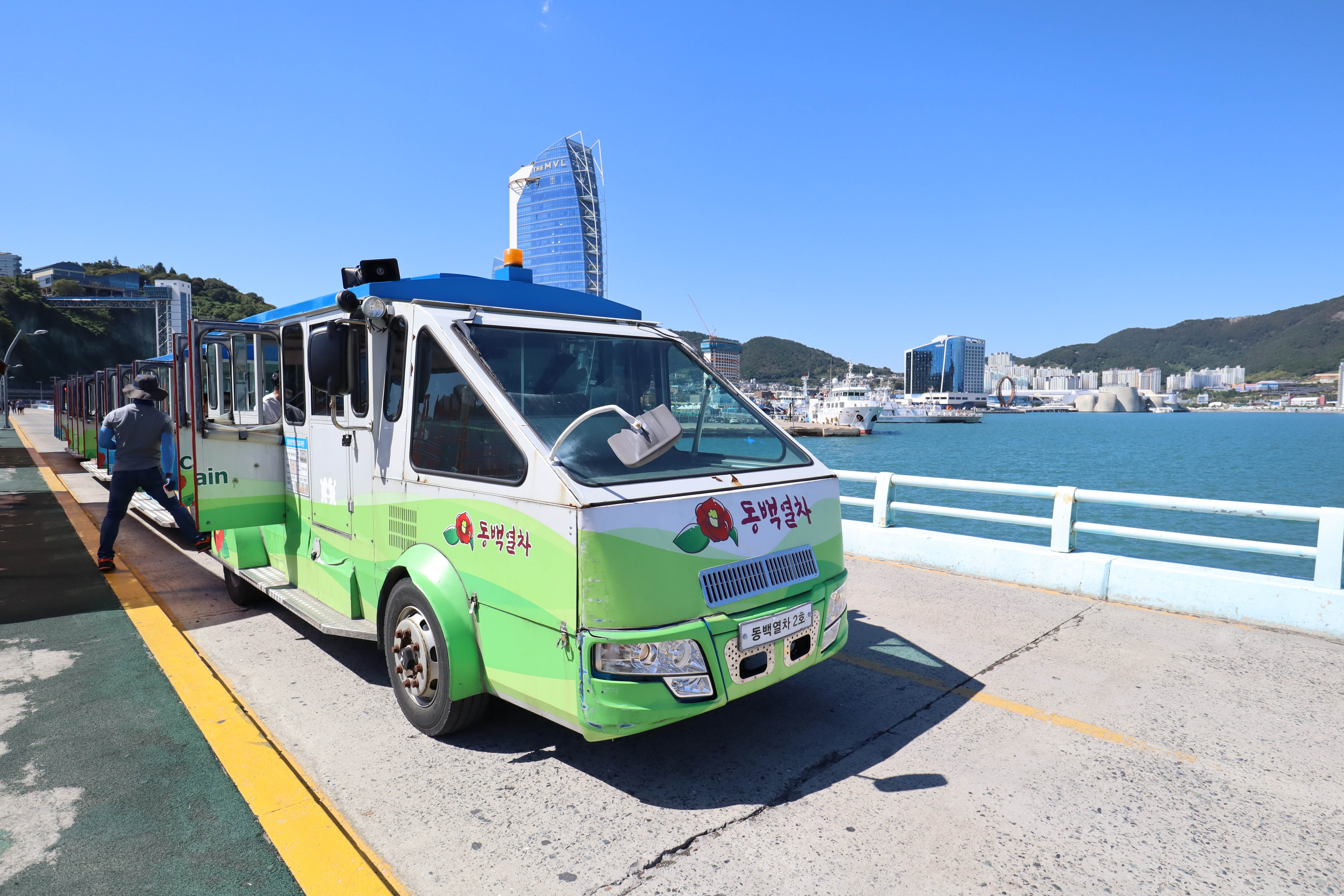
An optional paid train-like bus used to move passengers along the 768 meter bridge (2018)

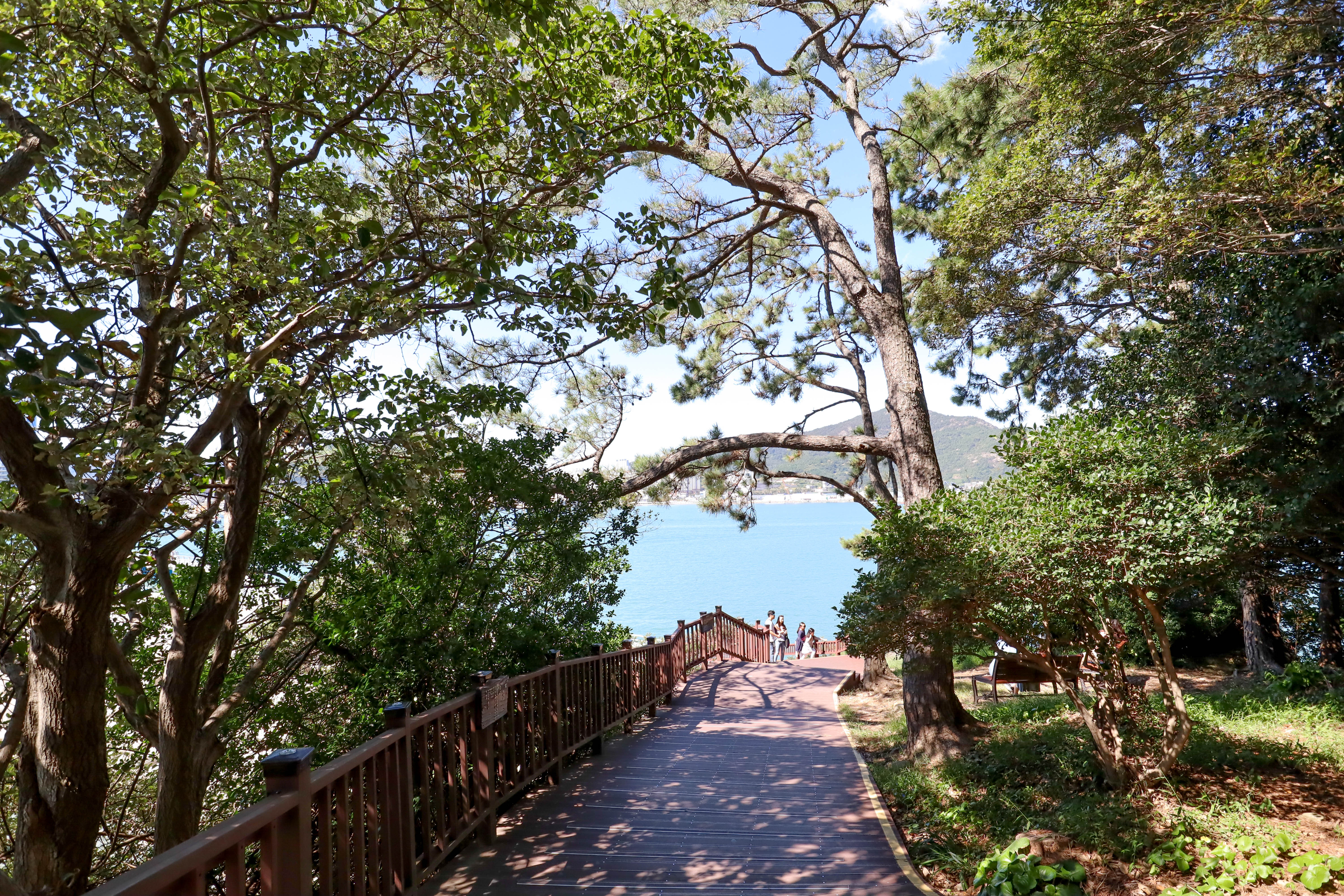
A walking path in the park (2018)

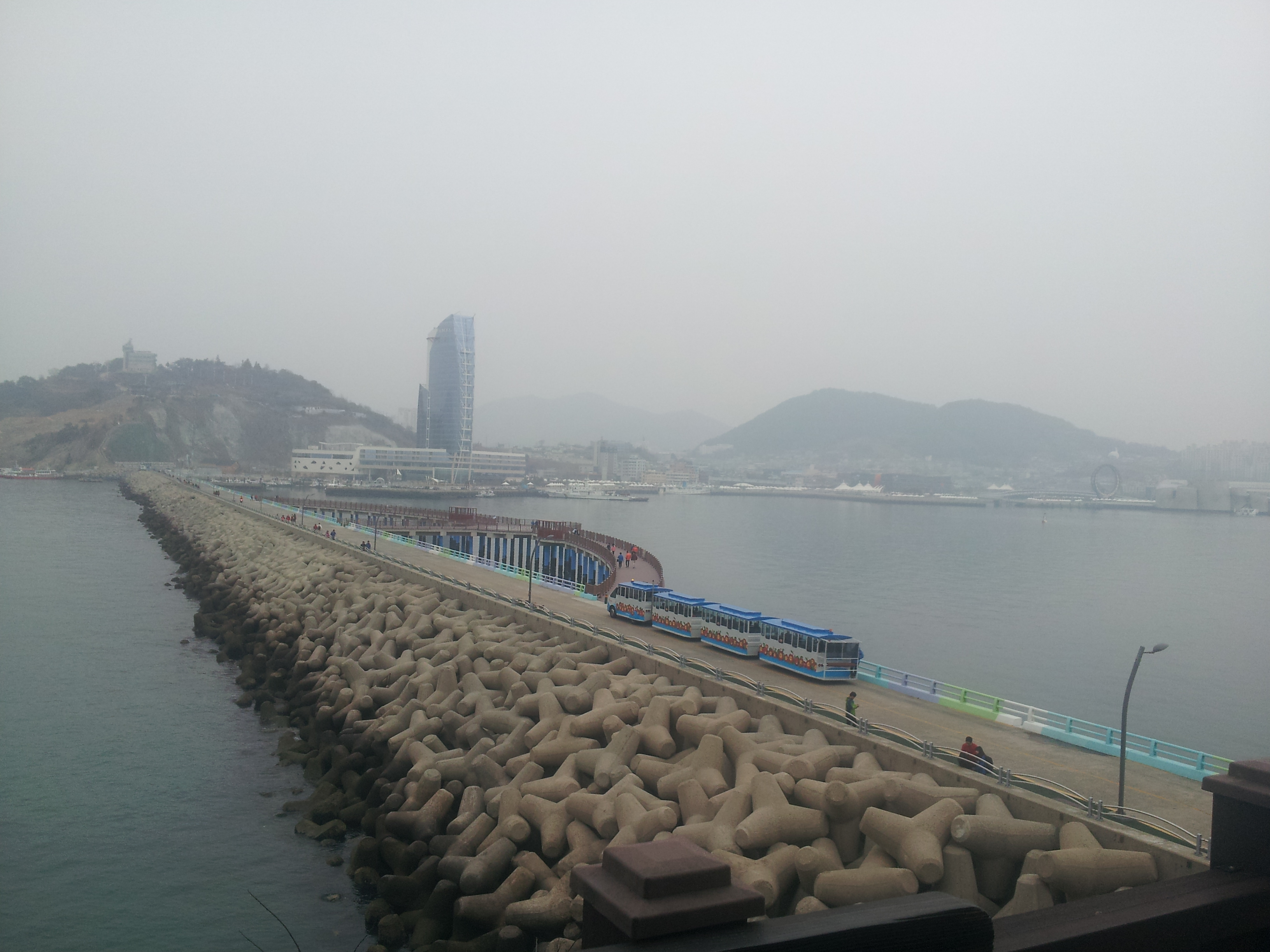
The bridge (facing the mainland) on a foggy day (2014)

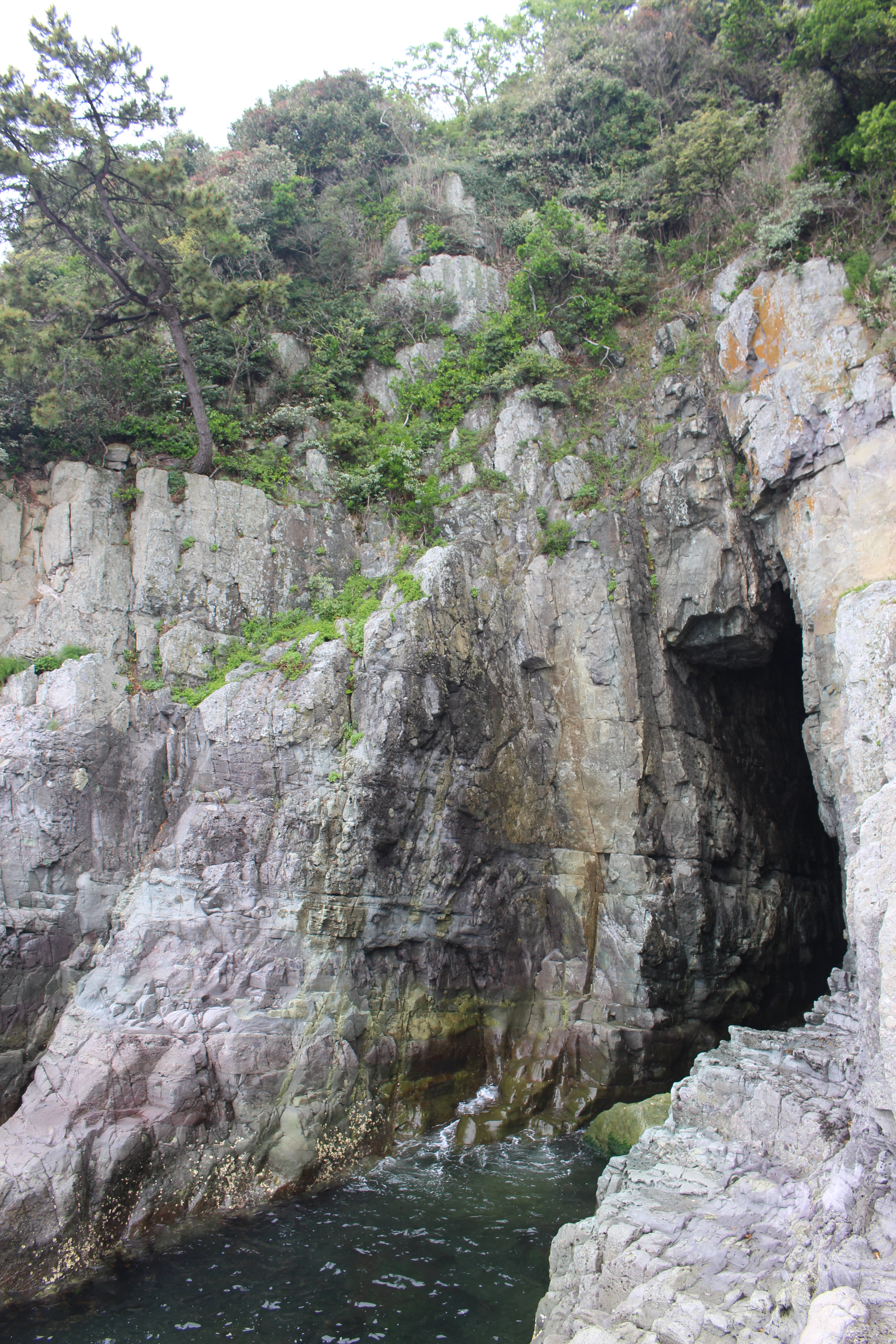
Yonggul, a cave on the island that a dragon is believed to live in (2017)
