= Dolsando =

Island in Yeosu, South Korea

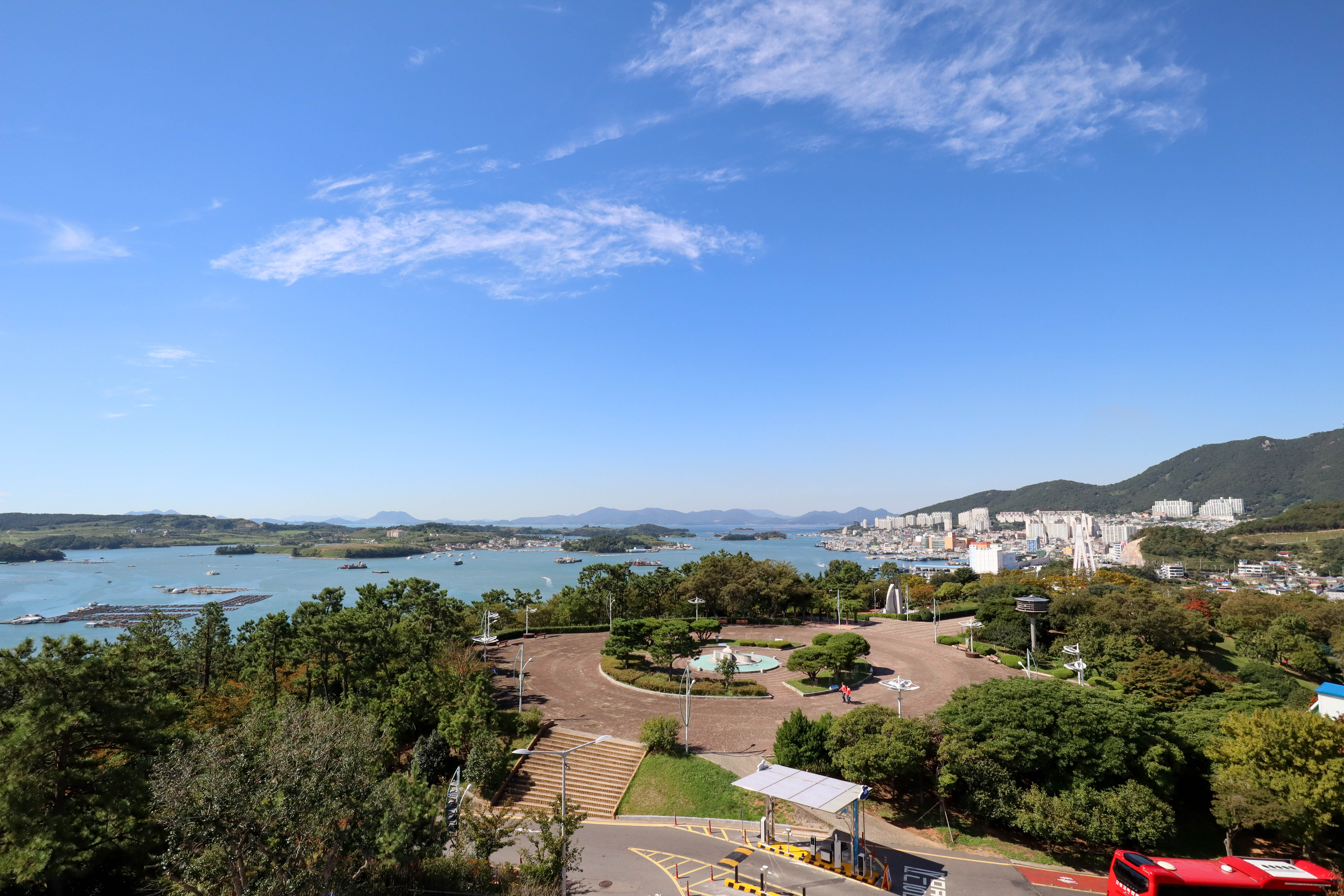
- Dolsan Park on the island (2018)
- Interactive map of Dolsando

Geography
- Location: South Sea
- Coordinates: 34°39′0″N 127°45′0″E
- Area: 70.31 km^{2} (27.15 sq mi)
- Highest elevation: 460.3 m (1510.2 ft)
- Highest point: Bonghwang

Administration
- South Korea
- Provincial-level cities: Jeonnam-Gwangju
- City: Yeosu
- Town: Dolsan
- Largest settlement: Yeosu

Demographics
- Ethnic groups: Korean

Korean name
- Hangul: 돌산도
- Hanja: 突山島
- RR: Dolsando
- MR: Tolsando

Dolsando (Korean: 돌산도) or Dolsan Island is an island in Yeosu, Jeonnam-Gwangju, South Korea.

The island has eight mountains: Daemisan, Bonghwangsan, Geumosan, Cheonwangsan, Dusan, Somisan, Cheonmasan, and Sujuksan. These mountains are rocky, which has led to a local belief that the island's name refers to the rocks (돌; dol) found there. Much of the island is covered with trees. Its economy is largely based on agriculture, fishing, and tourism.

The island is connected to the mainland and the rest of Yeosu by the Dolsan Bridge, which opened in 1984.

== See also ==
- Islands of South Korea
- Geography of South Korea
