= Dolsan Bridge =

Road bridge in Yeosu, South Korea

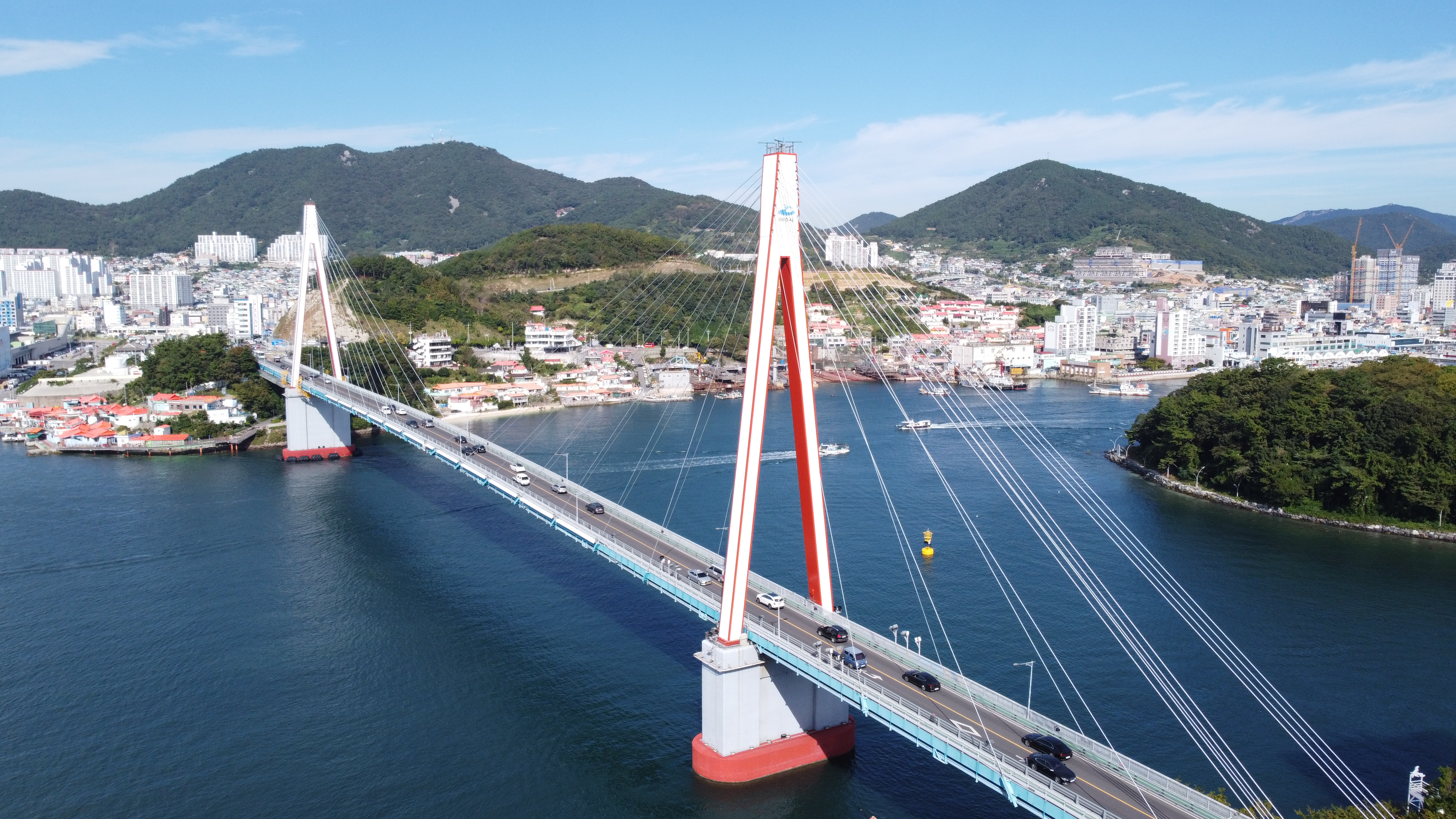
- The bridge, with Janggundo in the background (2022)
- Coordinates: 34°43′51″N 127°44′04″E
- Locale: Yeosu, South Jeolla Province, South Korea

Characteristics
- Design: cable stayed bridge
- Total length: 450 meters (1,480 ft)
- Width: 11.7 m (38 ft)
- No. of lanes: 2

History
- Opened: December 15, 1984

The Dolsan Bridge (Korean: 돌산대교; Hanja: 突山大橋; lit. Dolsan Great Bridge) is a bridge in Yeosu, South Jeolla Province, South Korea that connects the island Dolsando with the mainland. Construction on it began in 1980, and the bridge was opened on December 15, 1984. It has a length of 450 meters (1,480 ft) and a width of 11.7 m (38 ft).

== Gallery ==
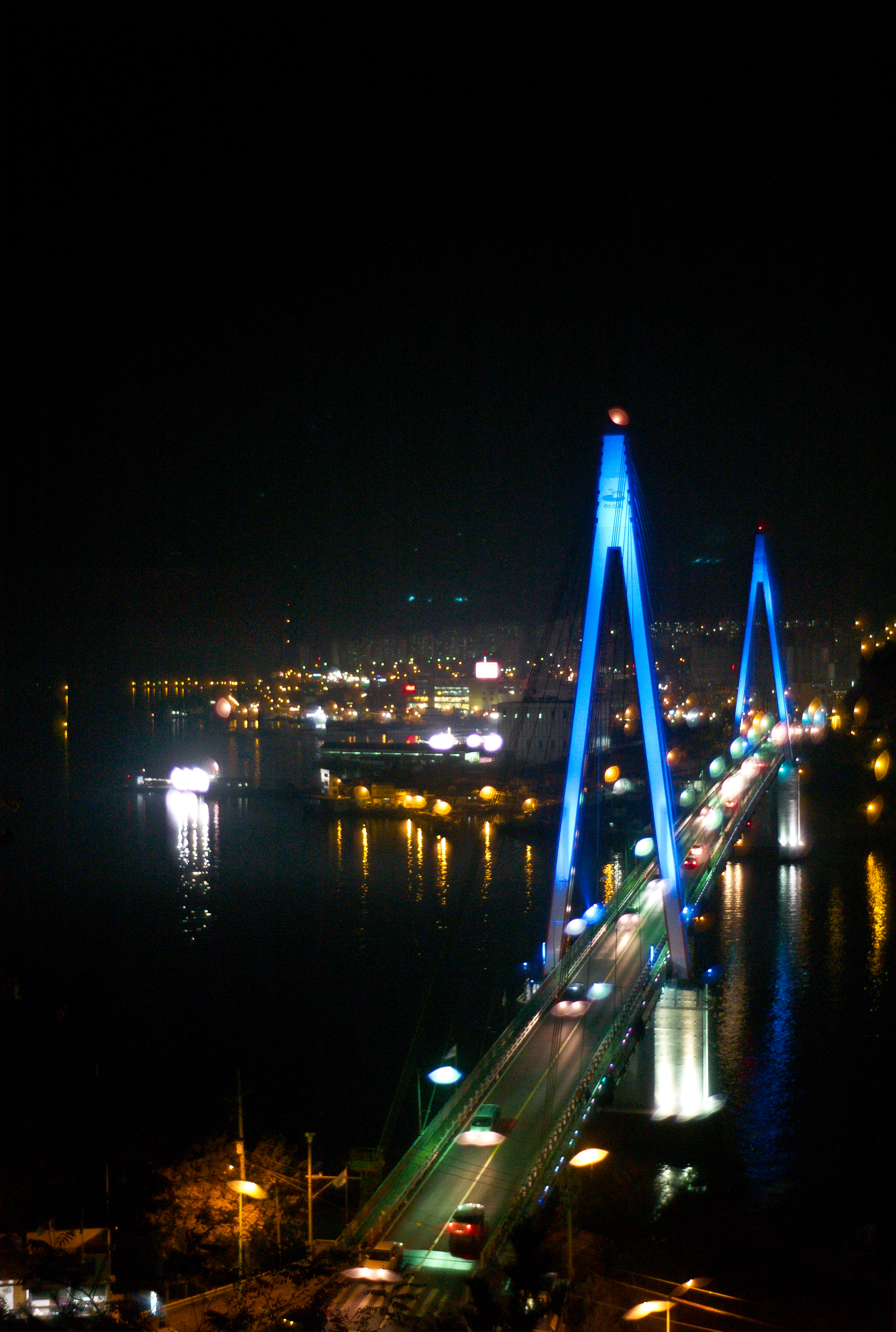
The bridge at night (2010)

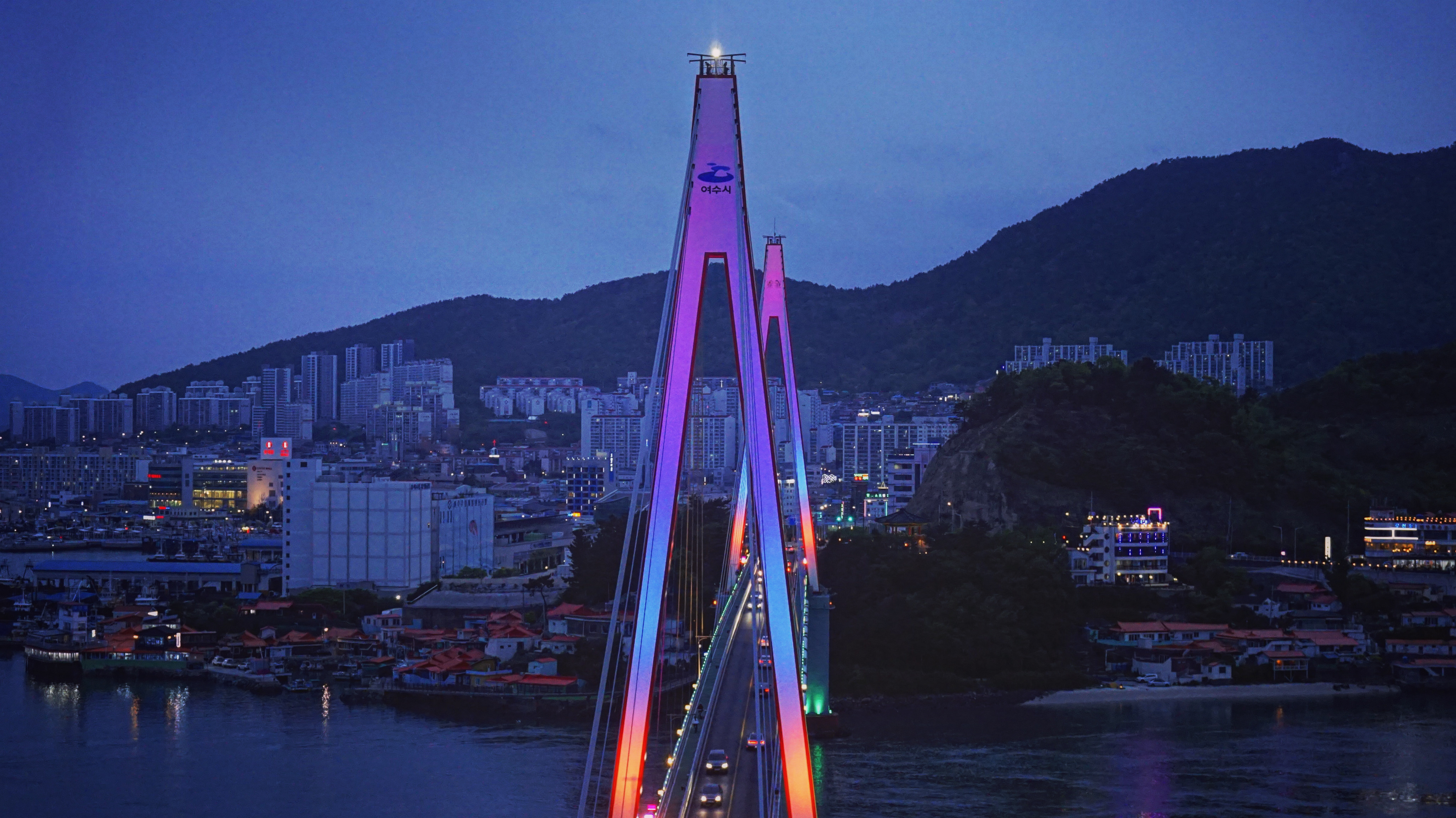
The bridge at dusk (2023)

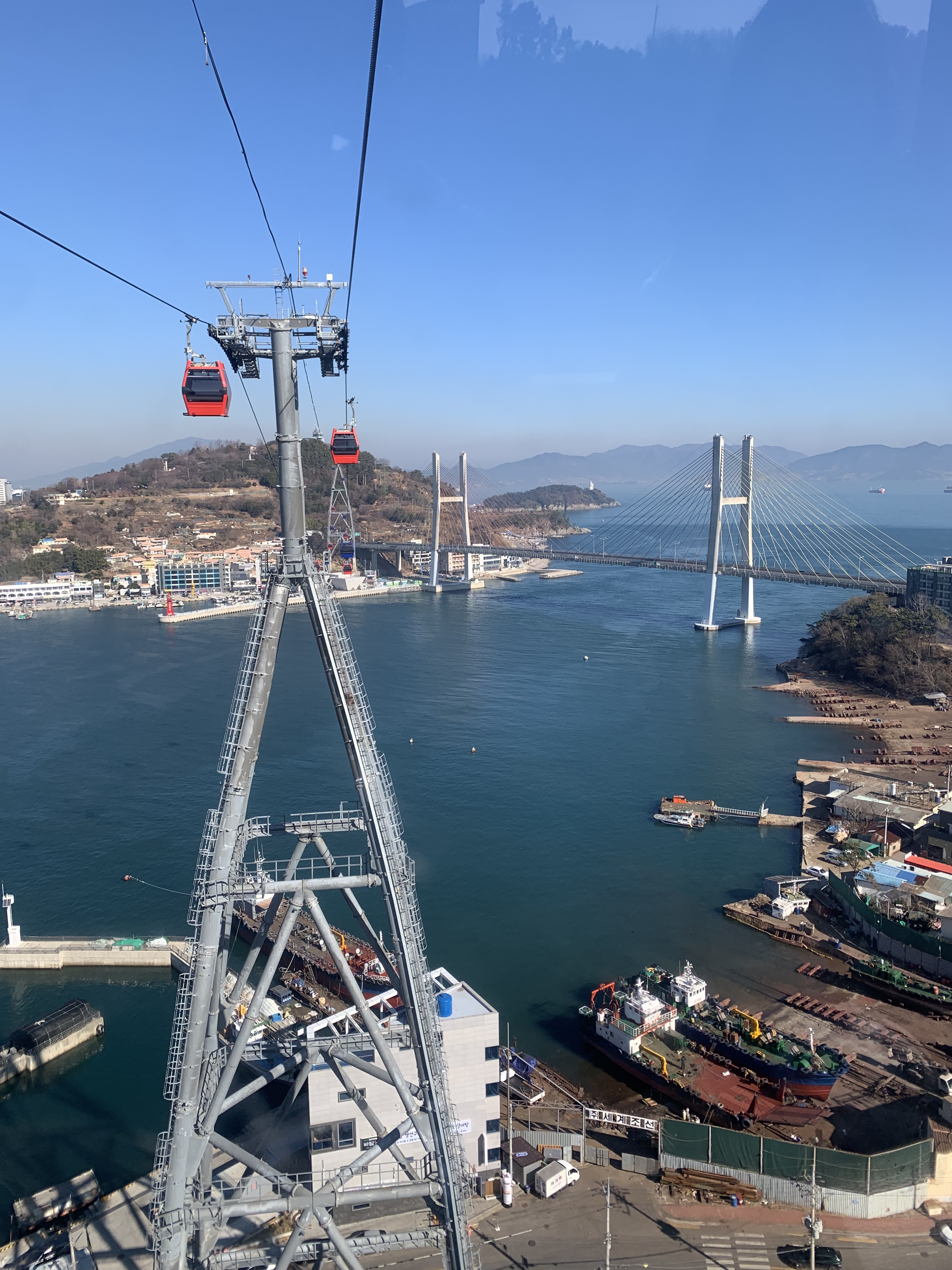
The bridge, as seen from the Yeosu Maritime Cable Car (2022)

== See also ==
- Yi Sun-sin Bridge – Another bridge in Yeosu
- Geobukseon Bridge – Another bridge in Yeosu
