= Yeosu =

City in Jeonnam-Gwangju, South Korea

Coordinates: 34°44′N 127°44′E

- Municipal city
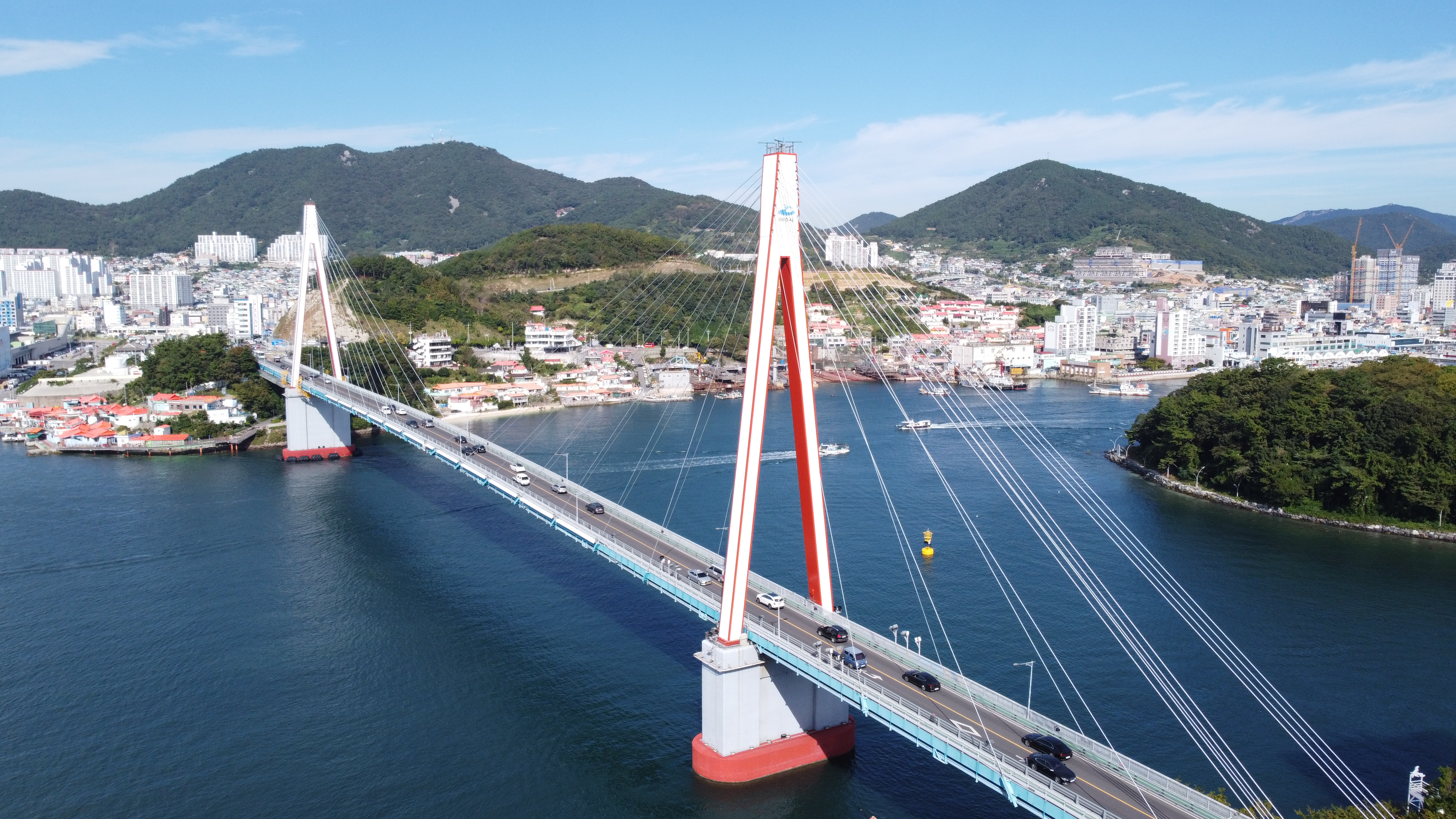
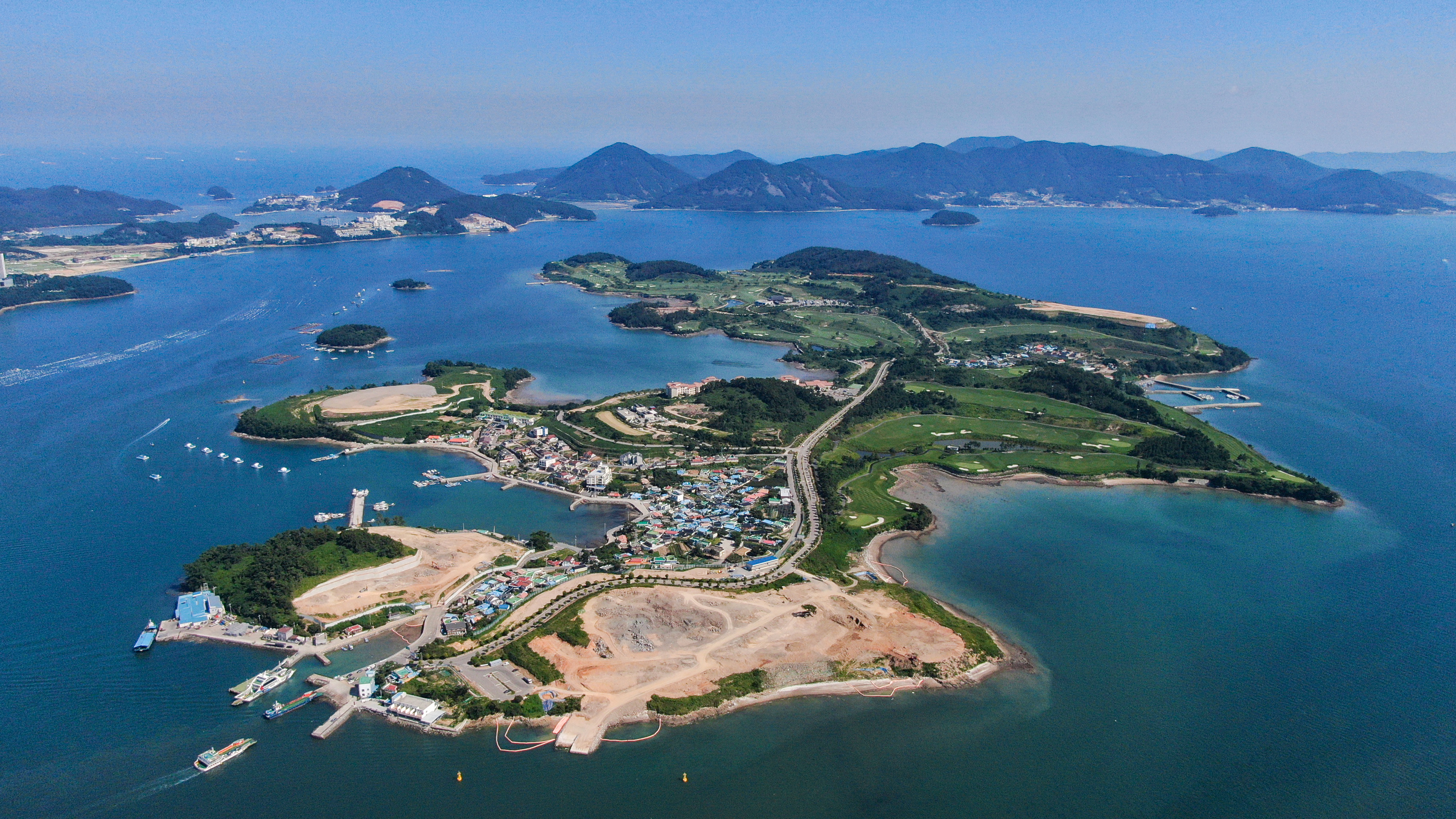
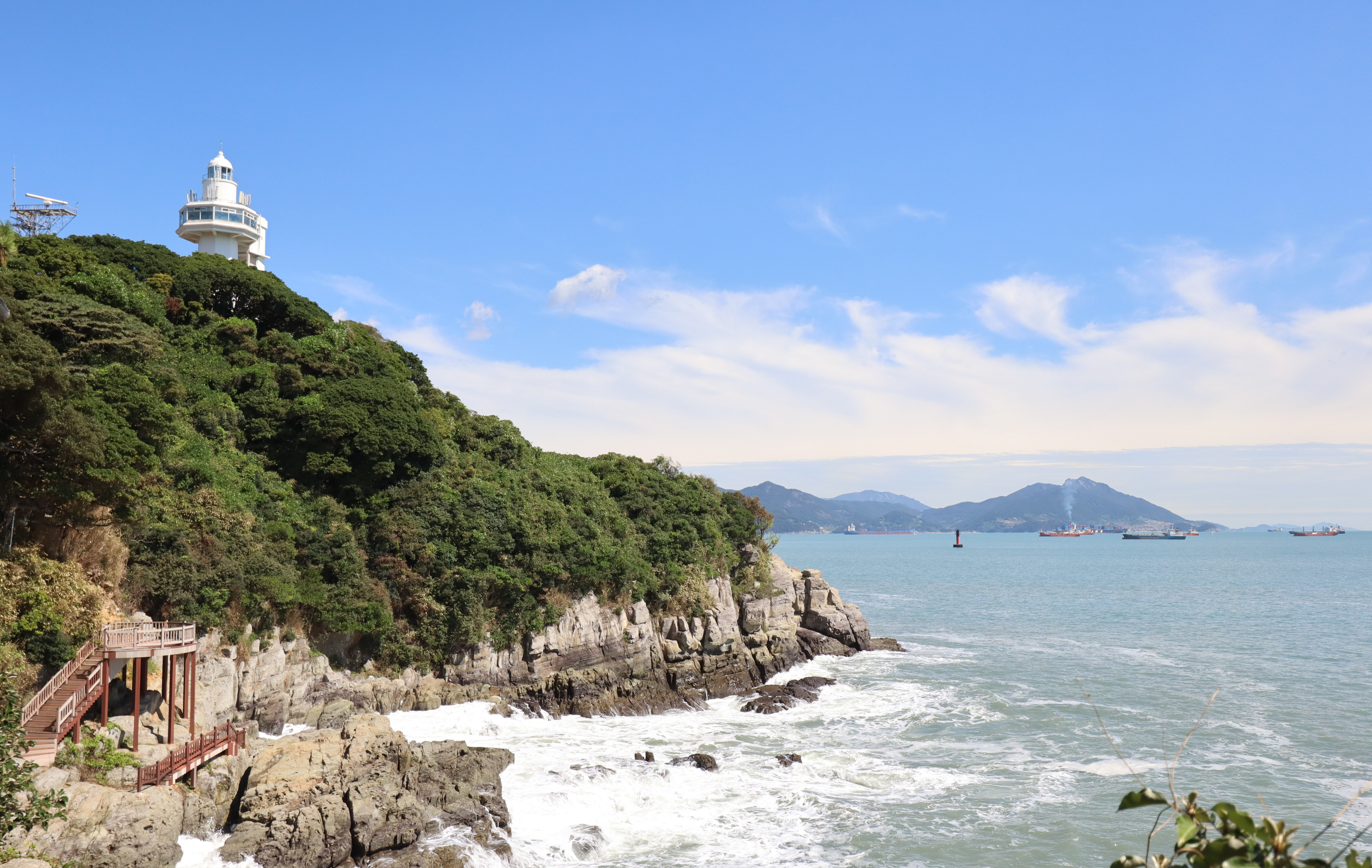
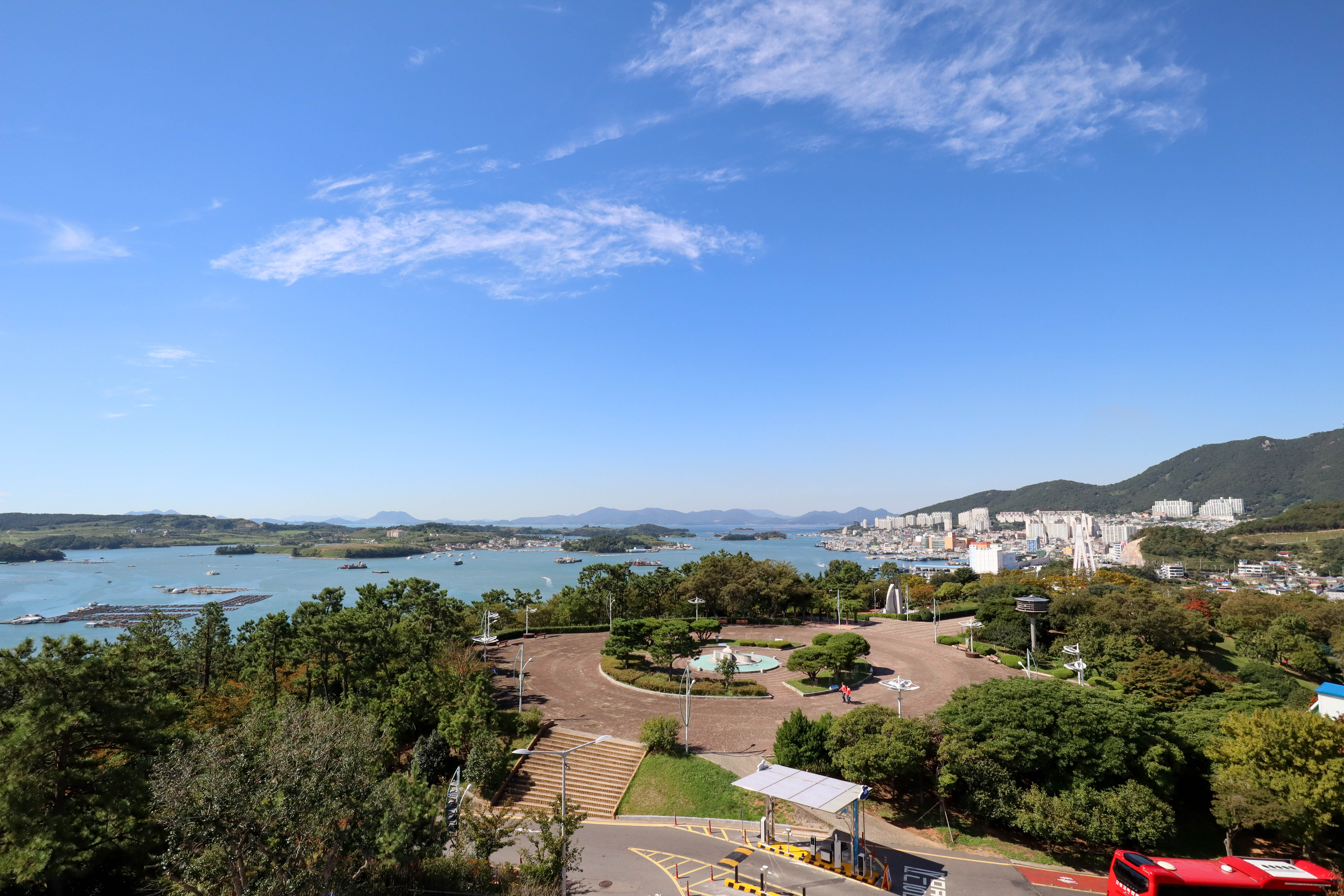
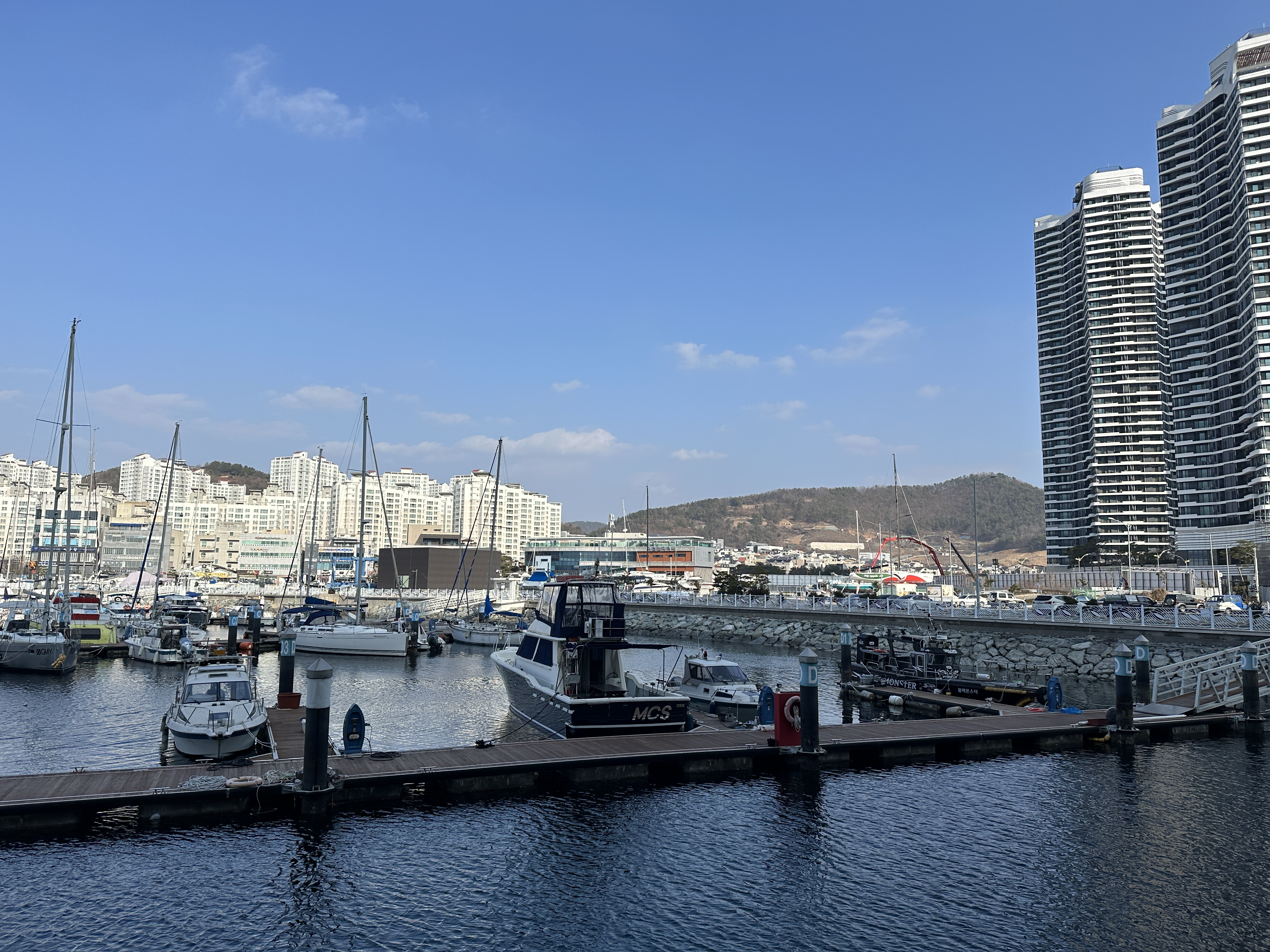
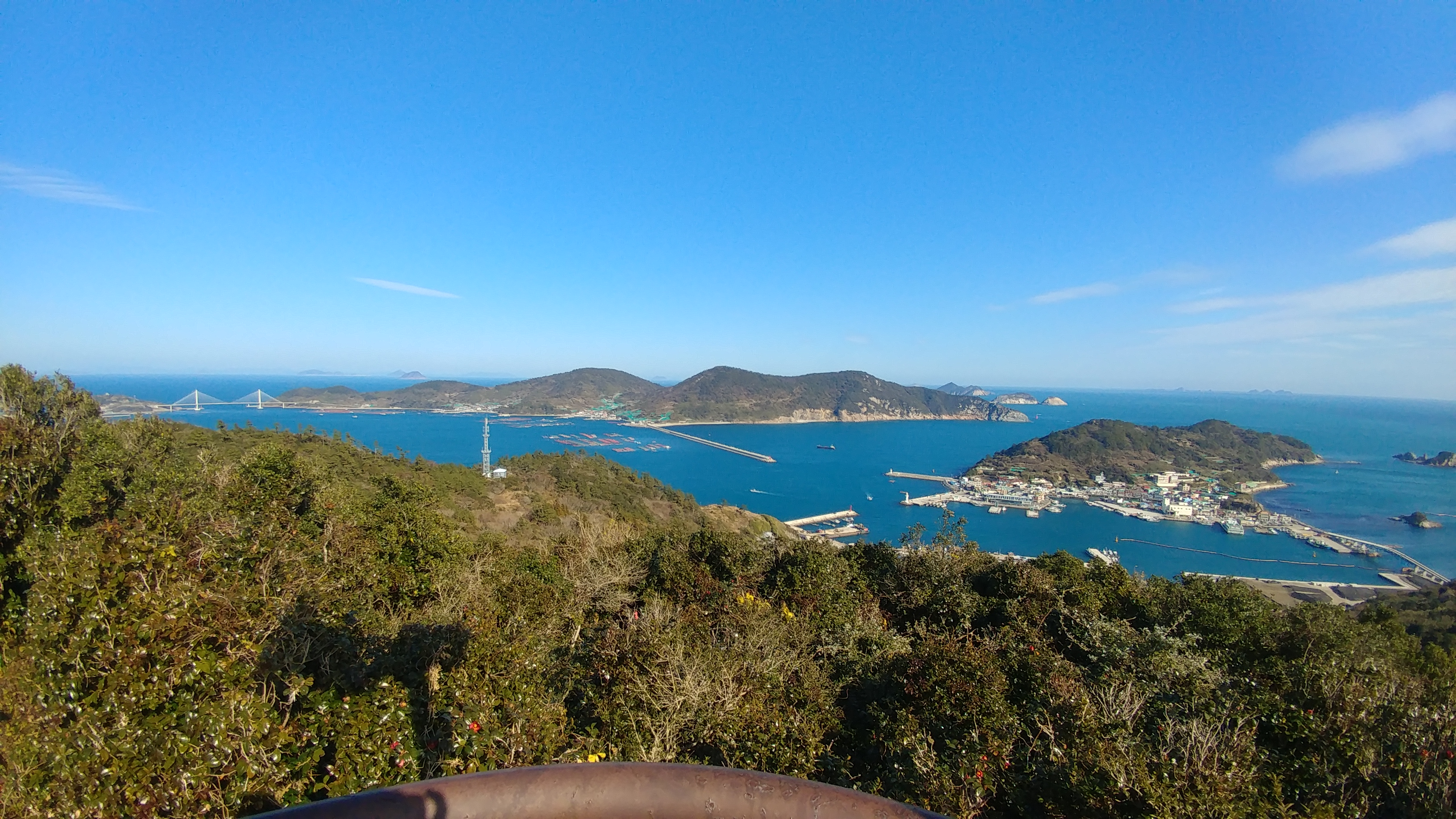
- Yeosu and the Dolsan Bridge Gyeongdo Island Odongdo Dolsan Park Yi Sun-sin Marina Bultanbong

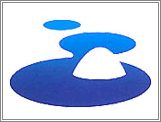
- Flag Emblem of Yeosu

- Location in South Korea
- Country: South Korea
- Region: Honam
- Provincial-level city: Jeonnam-Gwangju
- Administrative divisions: 1 eup, 6 myeon, 20 dong

Government
  - Mayor: Seo Young-Hak (서영학)

Area
  - Total: 503.33 km^{2} (194.34 sq mi)

Population (September 2024)
  - Total: 268,823
  - Density: 534.09/km^{2} (1,383.3/sq mi)
  - Dialect: Jeolla
- Time zone: UTC+9 (Korea Standard Time)
- Area code: +82-61-6xx

Korean name
- Hangul: 여수시
- Hanja: 麗水市
- RR: Yeosu-si
- MR: Yŏsu-si

Yeosu (Korean: 여수; Korean pronunciation: [jʌ.sʰu]; formerly romanized as Yŏsu) is a coastal city located in Jeonnam-Gwangju, South Korea. It has a population of 268,823.

In 1998, the old city of Yeosu, the city of Yeocheon, and Yeocheon County were merged to form the current city.

The city was once part of South Jeolla Province, but on July 1, 2026, that province was dissolved and merged with Gwangju into the provincial-level city of Jeonnam-Gwangju. Now, the city is directly managed under Jeonnam-Gwangju.

== Etymology ==
The place name "Yeosu" first appears in the Samguk Sagi Jiriji with the record: "Haeeup-hyeon (海邑縣) was originally Baekje's Wonzon-hyeon (猿村縣), but King Gyeongdeok changed its name. It is now Yeosu-hyeon (麗水縣) in Goryeo." In both Dongramdo (part of Donggukyeojiseungram) and Dongyeobigo (Jeollado's part), the name "Suyoung" (水營) is noted on the southern peninsula south of Suncheon and Gwangyang. This is believed to be because Jeollado's Jwasuyoung (Joseon Dynasty's Naval Headquarters for eastern sector of Jeolla Province) was established in this region starting in 1479 (the 10th year of King Seongjong's reign). Subsequently, most old maps depict it as "Yeosu" (呂水), written differently from the current Hanja. Specifically, in the Haedongdo (Suncheon) map, Jwasuyoung appears south of Yeosumyeon (呂水面).

== History ==
=== Neolithic period ===
The Neolithic sites in Yeosu were excavated and investigated by the National Gwangju Museum from 1989 to 1990. The artifacts unearthed include various types of pottery such as Yunggimong pottery, Apinmung pottery, Chimsunmung pottery, Jeomnyeolmung pottery, Juchil pottery, and Mummun pottery, as well as stone tools including milgae (hammerstones), jjikkgae (flint tools), jargegae (sickles), geukkeogae (scraping tools), saegigae (engraving tools), doggi (axes), galdol (grinding stones), and suttol (whetstones). Additionally, two residential sites were investigated.

The residential sites were constructed by compacting clay over shell layers, with diameters ranging from 460 to 540 centimeters, and featured a circular, flat layout equipped with round kilns. Notably, at the first residential site, a set of tools including a moru-dol (grindstone), galpan (grinding plate), and another galdol (grinding stone) were found near the kiln area. These tools allowed for the crushing or grinding of materials to produce powder, which drew significant attention. The radiocarbon dating of the Songdo shell mound indicated an age of 4285±195 BP and 4270±200 B.C.

In 1992 and 1993, surface surveys were conducted in the islands of Yeosu, leading to the additional investigation of 22 Neolithic shell mounds and 3 artifact dispersal sites. This revealed that the island regions of Yeosu, along with the coastal areas of South Gyeongsang Province, were cultural centers of the Neolithic period. The site locations were predominantly situated in bays suitable for various shellfish habitats, being safe from sea winds and featuring well-developed shell pits. The collected artifacts were similar to those unearthed from the Songdo shell mound, and a considerable number of Yunggimong pottery, which is dated to a relatively early period, were excavated.

=== Proto Three Kingdoms Period ===
In the Yeosu region during the Proto Three Kingdoms Period period, there appears to have been Wonji-guk (爰池國), one of the Mahan confederations. However, in the late 4th century, as Baekje expanded its power, several small states located in the present-day South Jeolla region came under Baekje's influence. Baekje did not immediately reorganize these small states into counties (郡縣) or dispatch local governors. Instead, Baekje recognized the authority of the chieftains of these small states and exercised indirect control through them by collecting tributes. It is believed that the Yeosu region was incorporated into Baekje under such circumstances.

=== Three Kingdoms Period ===
In the mid-5th century, Baekje's national power was significantly weakened due to Goguryeo's southward expansion. Additionally, as the Gaya Kingdom advanced into the lower regions of the Namyun and Seomjin rivers, the eastern part of South Jeolla was temporarily incorporated into Daegaya (Great Gaya). In 538, Baekje moved its capital to Sabi-seong and divided the entire country into five regions (五方) centered around the central, eastern, western, southern, and northern areas. In each region, Baekje established Bangseong (方城) and governed through these large and small fortresses, managing them as counties (郡) or prefectures (縣). In the southern region, now corresponding to Suncheon, Yeosu, and Gwangyang areas, Sapyeong-gun (歃平郡) was established.

Within Sapyeong-gun, there were three counties: Wonzon (猿村), Maro (馬老), and Dolsan (突山). Wonzon-hyeon (猿村縣) covered the Yeosu Peninsula, while Dolsan-hyeon (突山縣) included Dolsan-do and nearby islands. From this time, the Yeosu region saw the first establishment of counties named Wonzon and Dolsan.

Representative Baekje-era relics remaining in Yeosu include mountain fortresses such as Woram Mountain Fortress located in Dolsan Pyeongsari, Temi Mountain Fortress in Seonwon-dong, Jasan Mountain Fortress in Olim-dong, Gorak Mountain Fortress in Munsu-dong, and Jukpo-ri Bon Mountain Fortress in Dolsan. However, in 660, Baekje was defeated by Silla, and the Yeosu region was incorporated into Silla's territory.

=== Unified Silla Period ===
After the unification of the Three Kingdoms, Silla reorganized its local administrative structures to govern the expanded territories. The reorganization began around 677 (the 17th year of King Munmu's reign), after expelling the Tang forces, and continued through 687 (the 7th year of King Sinmun's reign), culminating in the establishment of the Nine Provinces and Five Subordinate Capitals (九州五小京) system. This system allowed Silla to directly control both the former territories of Baekje and Goguryeo and its own territories from the central government by dispatching administrators to the regions. In December 757 (the 16th year of King Gyeongdeok's reign), the names of the nine provinces and their counties were changed to Hanja names.

Silla's land was divided into provinces (주/ju/州), counties (군/gun/郡), and prefectures (현/hyun/縣), establishing a pyramid-shaped administrative structure with nine provinces. Each province contained counties under them, which were further divided into prefectures. To manage the ruling elites of the conquered regions during the unification process, the provinces were divided into three sub-provinces each, forming a nine-province administration system. Among these, one of the provinces, Muju (武州, also known as Mujinju), governed the present-day South Jeolla region. Seungpyeong-gun (昇平郡) within Muju consisted of three hyeon (郡縣), maintaining the same names as in Baekje: Haeeup-hyeon (海邑縣, Yeosu), Yeosan-hyeon (廬山縣, Dolsan), and Heeyang-hyeon (晞陽縣, Gwangyang). Consequently, during the Unified Silla period, the Yeosu region, excluding Samsan-myeon, consisted of Haeeup-hyeon (Yeosu) and Yeosan-hyeon (Dolsan).

Meanwhile, in the Gohung-gun area, Bunchagun (分領郡) was renamed to Bunryeong-gun (分領郡), Jojo-rye-hyeon (조조례縣) was renamed to Chungnyeol-hyeon (忠烈縣), Duhi-hyeon (두힐縣) was renamed to Gangwon-hyeon (薑原縣), and Bisa-hyeon (比史縣) was renamed to Baekju-hyeon. As a result, Samsan-myeon became Gangwon-hyeon (薑原縣).

In 892 (the 6th year of Queen Jinseong's reign), during the chaotic end of the Unified Silla period, Gyeon Hwon established his kingdom with Mujinju as his base, thereby bringing it under the influence of Later Baekje. Around this time, local Yeosu hojoks (호족/korean quasi nobility-gentry), such as Kim Chong (金摠), joined the Later Baekje forces. Conversely, the Dolsan area was under the control of Wang Bongkyu (王逢規) of Gangju (康州).

=== Goryeo dynasty ===
In 940 (the 23rd year of King Taejo's reign), the national administrative divisions were again reorganized into (주, ju),(부, bu),(군, gun), and (현, hyeon)-the addition of 부/bu. As a result, the Yeosu region, which was previously known as Haeeup-hyeon (海邑縣, Yeosu) and Yeosan-hyeon (廬山縣, Dolsan) during the Unified Silla period, was renamed to Yeosu-hyeon (麗水縣) and Dolsan-hyeon (突山縣) respectively. Although the name Yeosu (麗水) appeared for the first time at this point, both areas were still under the jurisdiction of Seungpyeong-gun (昇平郡, Suncheon).

Even in the early Goryeo period, remnants of militarized local powers remained in the regions. By the time of King Seongjong, the entire country had transitioned into a centralized governance system. Prior to this centralization, except for the western capital Seogyeong(modern day Pyongyang), Daedohobus(대도호부/大都護府), 'jin' s (진), 'ju' s (주), 'bu' s (부), 'gun' s (군), and 'hyun' s (현) did not have residential governors dispatched from the central government. Instead, semi-autonomous organizations known as hyangho were entrusted with local administration, while central officers such as Geumyoo (금유/今有) and Jo-jang (조장/租藏), responsible for tax collection, and Jeonunsa (전운사/轉運使), responsible for delivering the collected taxes to the central government, were periodically dispatched to tour the regions.

Starting in 983 (the 2nd year of King Seongjong's reign), residential governors (목사/moksa/牧使) were officially dispatched following the establishment of twelve 'mok's (牧) in the regions. These moksas were assigned to twelve provinces: Gwangju (廣州), Yangju, Chungju, Cheongju, Gongju, Jinju, Sangju, Jeonju, Naju, Hwangju, and Haeju. Their role was to oversee their respective provinces and the local administrative units (hyangjip/鄕職) within the counties and districts. The exact boundaries and the number of hyangjip under each mok were not documented.

In the South Jeolla Province region, the province of Muju (武州, also known as Mujinju)—one of the nine provinces of Unified Silla—was dissolved and replaced by Naju and Seungju (昇州, Suncheon) as part of the twelve mok. At this time, Yeosu was under the jurisdiction of Seungju.

In 995 (the 14th year of King Seongjong's reign), the administrative divisions were reorganized once again. The nation was divided into four Daedohobus(대도호부/大都護府) and ten provinces (도/do). Additionally, the twelve mok were transformed into twelve joldo-sa (절도사)s. The ten provinces were Gwannae (관내; 关内), Jungwon (중원; 中原), Hanan (하남; 河南), Gangnam (강남; 江南), Haeyang (해양; 海陽), Yeongnam (영남; 嶺南), Yeongdong (영동; 嶺東), Sannam (산남; 山南), Sakbang (삭방; 朔方), and Paeseo (패서; 浿西). The South Jeolla region fell under Haeyang-do (海陽道), and Yeosu was governed by Seungju Joldo-sa (昇州節度使), overseeing Yeosu-hyeon (麗水縣) and Dolsan-hyeon (突山縣).

In 1018 (the 9th year of King Hyeonjong's reign), another reorganization took place, dividing the country into four Daedohobus(대도호부/大都護府), eight moks (8목; Gwangju, Chungju, Cheongju, Jinju, Sangju, Jeonju, Naju, Hwangju), fifty-six 'ji-gun-sa' s(56주지군사), twenty-eight 'jin-jang' s (28진장), and twenty 'hyun-young' s (20현령). This reorganization resulted in Naju becoming one of the eight moks. At this time, Yeosu-hyeon and Dolsan-hyeon were incorporated into Seungpyeong-gun (昇平郡) under Naju and continued to exist until the late Goryeo period. Dolsan-hyeon was temporarily abolished but was reestablished. In 1350 (the 2nd year of King Chungjeong's reign) it was promoted to Juyeop (주읍), separated from Suncheonbu (순천부) and became an independent administrative entity, continuing for 47 years until the early Joseon period in 1396 (the 5th year of King Taejo's reign). Additionally, during the Goryeo period, the Yeosu region included other areas such as Sam-ilpo-hyang, Jinrye-bugok, and Sora-po-bugok alongside Yeosu-hyeon and Dolsan-hyeon.

=== Joseon dynasty ===
Beginning in 1479, the Joseon Dynasty's Naval Headquarters for eastern sector of Jeolla Province was located there. As such, it was the first base where Admiral Yi Sun-sin's fleet was based during the Imjin War which used the Turtle Ship or 'Kobukseon' which was built in Seon-so.

=== Recent history ===
==== Yeosu Rebellion ====
In October 1948, the town of Yeosu was taken by South Korean soldiers who refused to take part in the suppression of the ongoing Jeju uprising.

==== Post-rebellion development ====
On 25 December 1920, Yeosu Station started to operate as a railway that connects Yeosu and Gwangju. On 1 October 2011, however, the station was relocated to Deokchung-dong and renamed Yeosu Expo station, as the venue served for Yeosu World Expo in 2012.

In the 142nd General Assembly of BIE, held in Paris on 26 November 2007, the global community selected Yeosu as the host city for the 2012 World Expo. This was Korea's second World Expo, following Daejeon's 1993 Fair.

On July 1, 2026, South Jeolla Province was dissolved and merged with Gwangju into the provincial-level city of Jeonnam-Gwangju. Yeosu became directly managed under Jeonnam-Gwangju.

== Characteristics ==
The city of Yeosu consists of the Yeosu peninsula as well as 365 islands (48 inhabited, 317 uninhabited). Being midway along the southern coast of South Korea, it is flanked by Namhae County in South Gyeongsang Province to the east with a natural waterway, and the Bay of Suncheon to the west and northwest, the city of Suncheon sprawling along its banks. On 1 April 1998, the cities of Yeosu and Yeocheon, along with Yeocheon County merged to form the unified city of Yeosu.

It has a number of islands in its jurisdiction, including the uninhabited Janggundo, Dolsando, and the park island Jangdo.

== Attractions ==
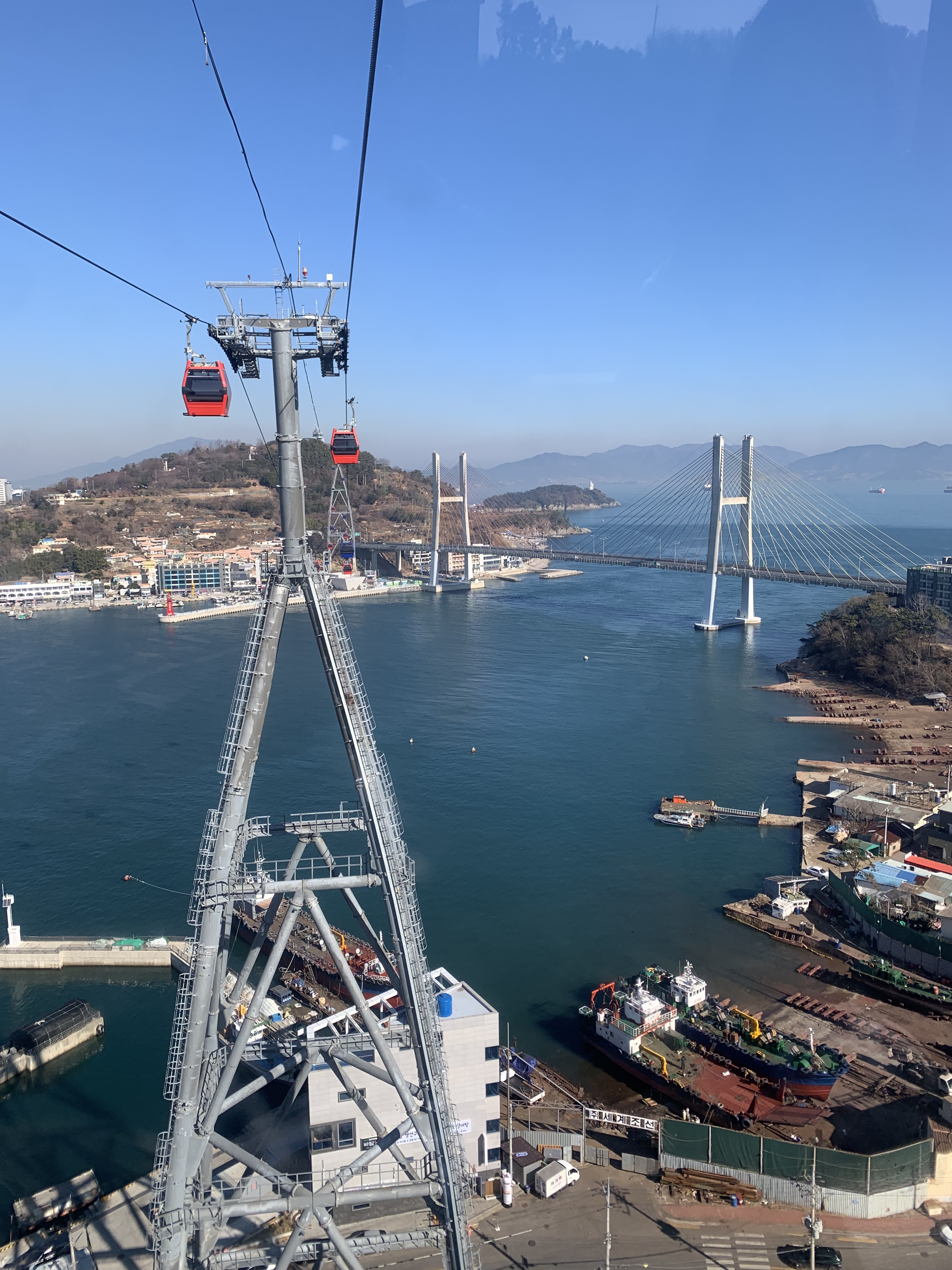
View from the Yeosu Maritime Cable Car, going south towards Dolsando (2022)

- Hyangiram Hermitage is a Buddhist temple that was first built by the monk Wonhyo in 644.
  - Hyangiram Sunrise Festival (여수향일암일출제) is an annual festival that begins on New Year's Eve. The festival consists of other activities and cultural events such as fireworks, folk street music, and lighting of wishes.
- The Yeosu Maritime Cable Car is an aerial tramway that goes between the island Dolsando and the mainland.
- Yeongchwisan is a culturally important mountain in the city. There are two Buddhist Temples on the mountain: Geumseongdae and Dosolam Hermitage, where ritual ceremonies and prayers were held during ancient days. Also known for its azalea flower blossoms, an azalea festival is held annually on the mountain in April during spring.

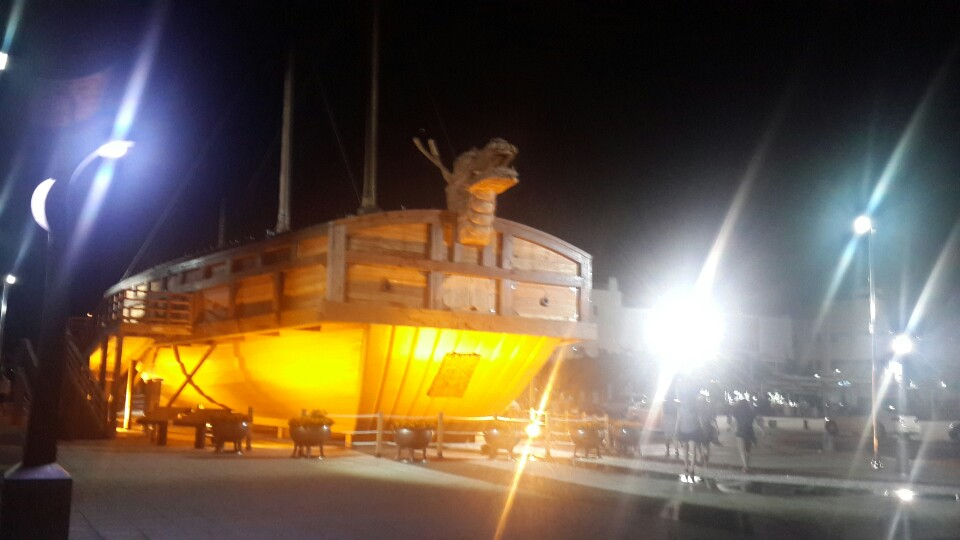
Model of a turtle ship

- In the harbour there is a full-size model of one of Admiral Yi's turtle ships, which are timber shelled vessels that were used with great success against the Japanese navy.
- Manseongri Beach near Yeosu has volcanic 'black' sand and is popular with Korean tourists. Recently, the famous Korean band Busker Busker made a song based on Manseongri Beach's night view. This popularised the site with Korean tourists. There are public showers and restrooms as well as on-duty lifeguards. Many restaurants located along the beach have beach-side tables and serve various seafood dishes. It is possible to take ferries to many of the local islands for an authentic taste of rural Korean food.
- Dolsan Bridge has changing lights at night. It is a 450-metre-long (1,480 ft) bridge connecting downtown Yeosu with Dolsan Island.
- A number of parks exist in the city, including Yi Sun-sin Park, Dolsan Park, and Geobukseon Park.
- The island Odongdo has many camellia flowers. There are 70 species of wild flowers there. A small population of local finless porpoises are present here.

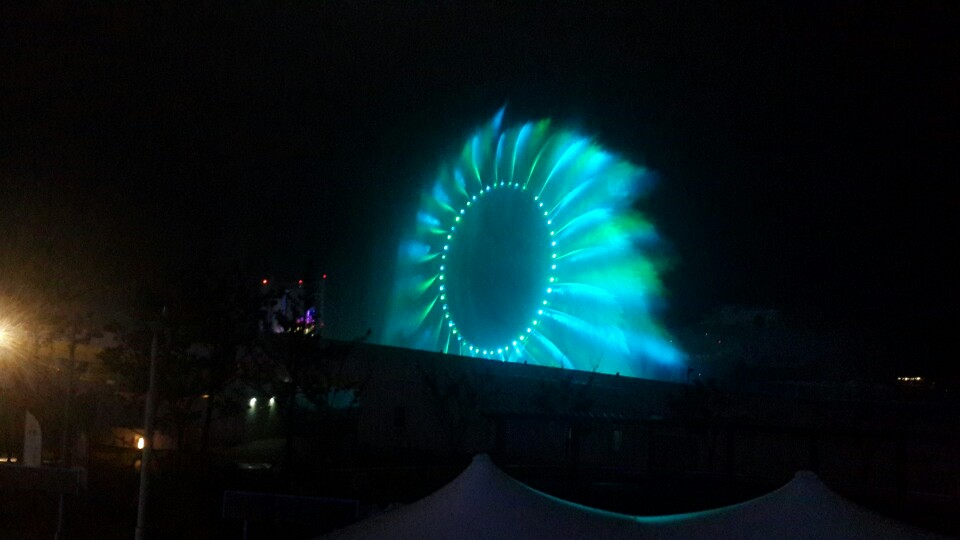
Colorful Big-O show

- Big-O show is a famous show in Yeosu which features an ocean fountain event and a hologram show. The show consists of three parts. The fountain spouts in accordance with classic and jazz music. Unique to this fountain is a large round steel frame at its centre.

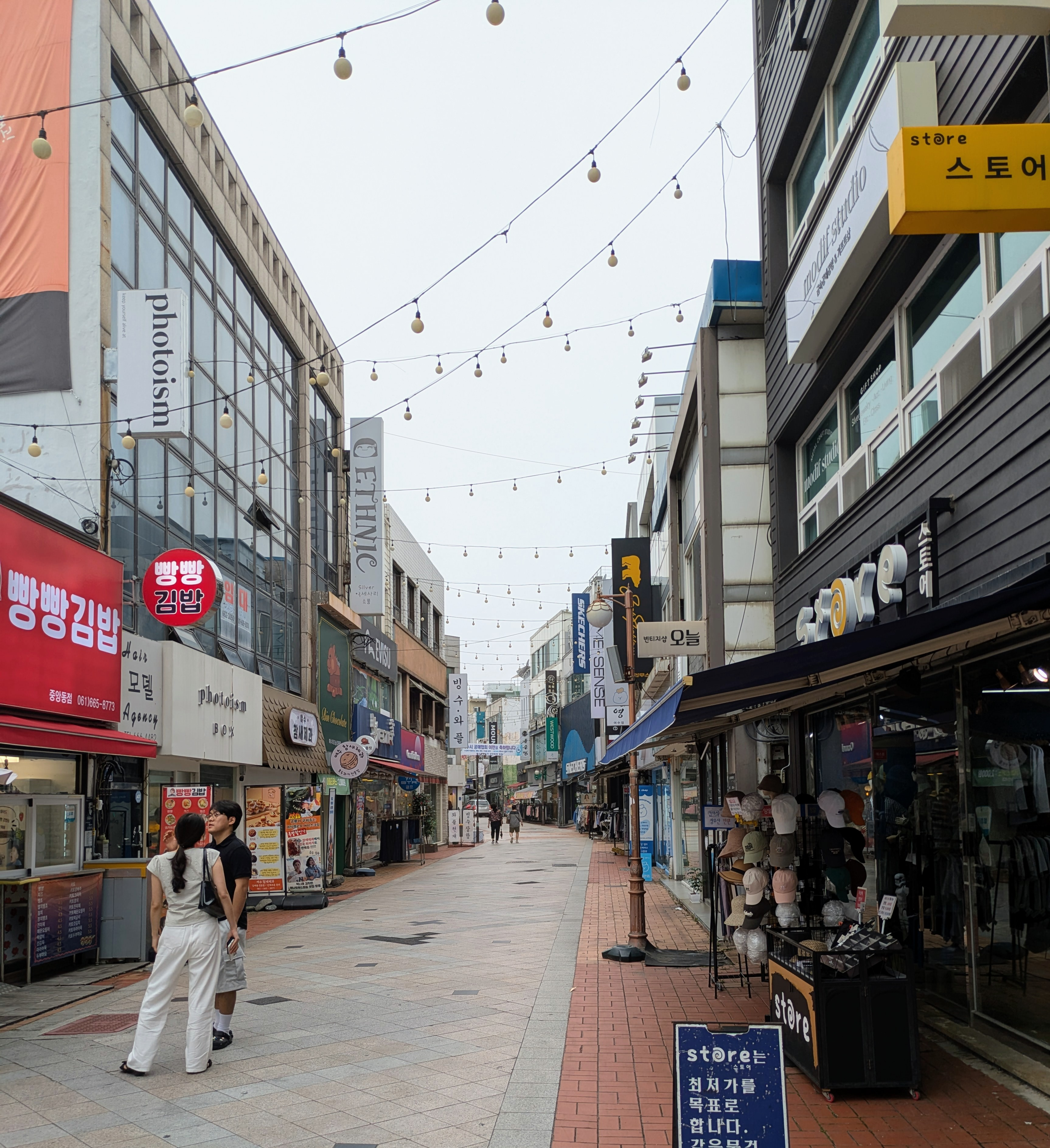
Shops along Jinnamsangga-gil

- The Ocean Resort is home to Yeosu's only waterpark. It offers condominium-style rooms and other facilities. Located in Soho-dong, the resort overlooks the yacht marina.
- Hanhwa Aqua Planet is a large aquarium.
- Ungcheon Beach Park allows both swimming and camping for much of the year.
- Yeosu Hamel Museum: In 1666, Hendrick Hamel wrote an account about his thirteen years spent in Korea titled "Hamel's Journal and a Description of the Kingdom of Korea 1653-1666." This was the first detailed account to introduce Korea to Europeans. A copy of the original handwritten journal is now on display in the museum.

== Local specialities ==
Gejang, or marinated raw crab is a representative speciality of Yeosu and a traditional Jeolla cuisine dish.

Yeosu is known for its Gat-kimchi, which is made from mustard greens, that was developed in the Yeosu town Dolsan.

== Climate ==
Yeosu has a humid subtropical climate (Köppen: Cwa) with very warm summers and cold winters. Rainfall is much heavier in the summer, with June to August recording over 200 millimetres (7.9 in) of rainfall per month. The highest temperature ever recorded is 37.1 °C (98.8 °F) on 20 July 1994 while the lowest temperature ever recorded is −12.6 °C (9.3 °F) on 16 February 1977.

Climate data for Yeosu (1991–2020 normals, extremes 1942–present)
| Month | Jan | Feb | Mar | Apr | May | Jun | Jul | Aug | Sep | Oct | Nov | Dec | Year |
|---|---|---|---|---|---|---|---|---|---|---|---|---|---|
| Record high °C (°F) | 17.4 (63.3) | 19.5 (67.1) | 22.0 (71.6) | 27.4 (81.3) | 33.5 (92.3) | 32.1 (89.8) | 37.1 (98.8) | 36.4 (97.5) | 33.9 (93.0) | 28.9 (84.0) | 27.9 (82.2) | 20.2 (68.4) | 37.1 (98.8) |
| Mean daily maximum °C (°F) | 6.6 (43.9) | 8.5 (47.3) | 12.4 (54.3) | 17.4 (63.3) | 21.7 (71.1) | 24.4 (75.9) | 27.3 (81.1) | 28.9 (84.0) | 25.8 (78.4) | 21.3 (70.3) | 15.1 (59.2) | 8.9 (48.0) | 18.2 (64.8) |
| Daily mean °C (°F) | 2.8 (37.0) | 4.4 (39.9) | 8.3 (46.9) | 13.3 (55.9) | 17.9 (64.2) | 21.2 (70.2) | 24.5 (76.1) | 26.0 (78.8) | 22.6 (72.7) | 17.5 (63.5) | 11.3 (52.3) | 5.1 (41.2) | 14.6 (58.3) |
| Mean daily minimum °C (°F) | −0.3 (31.5) | 0.9 (33.6) | 4.8 (40.6) | 9.9 (49.8) | 14.7 (58.5) | 18.8 (65.8) | 22.5 (72.5) | 23.8 (74.8) | 20.0 (68.0) | 14.5 (58.1) | 8.2 (46.8) | 2.0 (35.6) | 11.7 (53.1) |
| Record low °C (°F) | −11.9 (10.6) | −12.6 (9.3) | −8.8 (16.2) | −2.3 (27.9) | 6.8 (44.2) | 12.6 (54.7) | 14.3 (57.7) | 15.6 (60.1) | 11.6 (52.9) | 1.9 (35.4) | −5.3 (22.5) | −10.8 (12.6) | −12.6 (9.3) |
| Average precipitation mm (inches) | 24.5 (0.96) | 44.6 (1.76) | 83.9 (3.30) | 125.2 (4.93) | 143.5 (5.65) | 194.3 (7.65) | 276.8 (10.90) | 264.8 (10.43) | 151.7 (5.97) | 66.6 (2.62) | 46.8 (1.84) | 26.4 (1.04) | 1,449.1 (57.05) |
| Average precipitation days (≥ 0.1 mm) | 4.9 | 5.7 | 8.0 | 8.8 | 9.6 | 10.5 | 13.8 | 12.1 | 9.2 | 4.8 | 6.1 | 5.0 | 98.5 |
| Average snowy days | 3.1 | 2.4 | 0.8 | 0.0 | 0.0 | 0.0 | 0.0 | 0.0 | 0.0 | 0.0 | 0.4 | 2.7 | 9.4 |
| Average relative humidity (%) | 53.0 | 53.1 | 57.4 | 61.8 | 68.1 | 77.9 | 84.5 | 79.4 | 71.7 | 62.5 | 59.5 | 54.8 | 65.3 |
| Mean monthly sunshine hours | 193.3 | 191.6 | 209.8 | 215.4 | 227.7 | 175.1 | 163.0 | 197.4 | 181.1 | 219.2 | 189.8 | 197.8 | 2,361.2 |
| Percentage possible sunshine | 61.6 | 60.5 | 54.8 | 55.0 | 50.8 | 40.1 | 35.9 | 47.2 | 48.0 | 61.7 | 61.3 | 64.8 | 52.4 |
Source: Korea Meteorological Administration (percent sunshine 1981–2010)

Climate data for Geomundo, Yeosu (1993–2020 normals)
| Month | Jan | Feb | Mar | Apr | May | Jun | Jul | Aug | Sep | Oct | Nov | Dec | Year |
|---|---|---|---|---|---|---|---|---|---|---|---|---|---|
| Mean daily maximum °C (°F) | 7.5 (45.5) | 9.2 (48.6) | 12.6 (54.7) | 16.7 (62.1) | 20.6 (69.1) | 23.8 (74.8) | 27.4 (81.3) | 29.5 (85.1) | 26.0 (78.8) | 21.5 (70.7) | 15.6 (60.1) | 9.8 (49.6) | 18.4 (65.1) |
| Daily mean °C (°F) | 5.0 (41.0) | 6.1 (43.0) | 9.4 (48.9) | 13.5 (56.3) | 17.3 (63.1) | 20.7 (69.3) | 24.6 (76.3) | 26.7 (80.1) | 23.4 (74.1) | 18.7 (65.7) | 12.9 (55.2) | 7.3 (45.1) | 15.5 (59.9) |
| Mean daily minimum °C (°F) | 2.7 (36.9) | 3.7 (38.7) | 6.8 (44.2) | 11.0 (51.8) | 14.8 (58.6) | 18.6 (65.5) | 22.6 (72.7) | 24.7 (76.5) | 21.5 (70.7) | 16.8 (62.2) | 10.7 (51.3) | 5.0 (41.0) | 13.2 (55.8) |
| Average precipitation mm (inches) | 29.8 (1.17) | 50.9 (2.00) | 86.6 (3.41) | 107.5 (4.23) | 133.9 (5.27) | 184.6 (7.27) | 216.5 (8.52) | 215.9 (8.50) | 156.1 (6.15) | 76.8 (3.02) | 48.7 (1.92) | 30.9 (1.22) | 1,338.2 (52.69) |
| Average precipitation days (≥ 0.1 mm) | 4.2 | 4.9 | 6.4 | 7.6 | 8.0 | 9.1 | 9.9 | 8.5 | 7.9 | 4.9 | 5.6 | 4.3 | 81.3 |
Source: Korea Meteorological Administration

== Sister cities ==
- Hangzhou, Zhejiang, China
- Karatsu, Saga, Japan
- Kota Kinabalu, Malaysia
- Sikeston, Missouri, United States
- Vanino, Khabarovsk Krai, Russia
- Weihai, Shandong, China
- Port of Spain, Trinidad and Tobago
- Santiago de Querétaro, Querétaro, Mexico
- Lishui, Zhejiang, China
- Cebu City, Philippines
- Belize City, Belize
- Seward, Alaska, United States of America

== Notable people ==
- Maangchi, Korean-American YouTuber and author
- Dohee, singer, dancer, actress and K-pop idol, former member of K-pop girlgroup Tiny-G
- Earl Lee, Korean-Canadian conductor and cellist
- Youra, singer-songwriter

== See also ==
- List of cities in South Korea
- Korea2012 Yeosu Expo
