= Expo-daero =

Expo-daero
- 엑스포대로

Route information
- Length: 33.6 km (20.9 mi)
- Existed: 12 April 2012–present

Major junctions
- From: Dolsan-eup, Yeosu, South Jeolla; Dolsan-ro (National Route 17 and National Route 77)
- To: Haeryong-myeon, Suncheon, South Jeolla; Alternative bypass to the National Route 2 (National Route 17)

Location
- Country: South Korea
- Major cities: Yeosu, Suncheon

Highway system
- Highway systems of South Korea; Expressways; National; Local

Expo-daero (Korean: 엑스포대로; Hanja: 엑스포大路; RR: Ekseupo-daero) is the road connecting Dolsan Intersection in Dolsan-eup, Yeosu, South Jeolla and Seongsangyo in Haeryong-myeon, Suncheon, South Jeolla. The all section is part of National Route 17, and from Deogyang Intersection to end of road is part of Local Route 22. This road was opened to traffic on 12 April 2012 for Expo 2012.

== History ==
- 20 January 2012: opened to temporary traffic (17.36 km; Sora-myeon, Yeosu – Haeryong-myeon, Suncheon)
- 12 April 2012: opened to traffic (38.8 km)

== List of Facilities ==
- (■): Motorway (자동차전용도로; Jadongcha Jeonyong Doro)
- IC: Interchange (나들목; Nadeulmok)
- IS: Intersection (교차로; Gyocharo)
- 3-IS: 3-way Intersection (삼거리; Samgeori)
- 4-IS: 4-way Intersection (사거리; Sageori)
- BR: Big Bridge (대교; Daegyo)
- br: bridge (교; Gyo)
- TN: tunnel (터널; Teoneol)

Name	Korean name	Connections	Location		Notes
Dolsan IS	돌산교차로	Dolsan-ro (National Route 17; National Route 77)	Yeosu	Dolsan-eup	
Geobukseon BR	거북선대교		Yeosu	Dolsan-eup	
Geobukseon BR	거북선대교		Yeosu	Dongmun-dong	
Jasan TN	자산터널		Yeosu	Dongmun-dong	length: 443m
Jasan TN	자산터널		Yeosu	Hanryeo-dong	length: 443m
Front of Yeosu Station	여수역 앞	Dongmun-ro	Yeosu	Hanryeo-dong	
Yeosu Expo	여수엑스포		Yeosu	Mandeok-dong	
Mandeok 4-IS	만덕사거리	Deokchungan-gil	Yeosu	Mandeok-dong	
Yeosu Expo station	여수엑스포역		Yeosu	Mandeok-dong	
Deokchung IC	덕충나들목	Mangyang-ro	Yeosu	Mandeok-dong	
Marae TN	마래터널		Yeosu	Mandeok-dong	Suncheon bound: 1397m Yeosu bound: 1351m
Manheung Wisaeng Maeripjang	만흥위생매립장		Yeosu	Mandeok-dong	You can't exit from Suncheon bound.
Manheung IC	만흥나들목	Manseong-ro	Yeosu	Mandeok-dong	
Dundeok IC Dundeok 1 TN	둔덕나들목 둔덕1터널	Sangam-ro (National Route 77)	Yeosu	Mipyeong-dong	length: 321m
Dundeok IC Dundeok 1 TN	둔덕나들목 둔덕1터널	Sangam-ro (National Route 77)	Yeosu	Dundeok-dong	length: 321m
Expo TN	엑스포터널		Yeosu	Dundeok-dong	length: 2014m
Expo TN	엑스포터널		Yeosu	Samil-dong	
Jusam IC	주삼나들목	Yeosusandan-ro	Yeosu	Samil-dong	
Gongdan 3-IS	공단삼거리	Yeosusandan2-ro	Yeosu	Jusam-dong	
Yeosu IC	여수 나들목	Jwasuyeong-ro	Yeosu	Jusam-dong	
Haesan IC	해산 나들목	Yeosusandan1-ro; Museon-ro	Yeosu	Jusam-dong	
Sora br	소라교		Yeosu	Jusam-dong	
Sora br	소라교		Yeosu	Sora-myeon	
Deogyang IS	덕양교차로	Deogyang-ro (Local Route 22); Yeosun-ro	Yeosu	Sora-myeon	
Daepo br	대포교		Yeosu	Sora-myeon	
(2nd Sandan IC)	(제2산단 나들목)	Yeosun-ro	Yeosu	Sora-myeon	
Singi br	신기교		Yeosu	Sora-myeon	
Daepo TN	대포터널		Yeosu	Sora-myeon	length: 788m
Daepo TN	대포터널		Yeosu	Yulchon-myeon	length: 788m
Sangok br	산곡교		Yeosu	Yulchon-myeon	
Sangok TN	산곡터널		Yeosu	Yulchon-myeon	length: 580m
Chwijeok br	취적교		Yeosu	Yulchon-myeon	
Chwijeok TN	취적터널		Yeosu	Yulchon-myeon	Suncheon bound: 490m Yeosu bound: 475m
Yulchon IS	율촌 교차로	Seobu-ro	Yeosu	Yulchon-myeon	
Yulchon TN	율촌터널		Yeosu	Yulchon-myeon	Suncheon bound: 510m Yeosu bound: 445m
Yulchon TN	율촌터널		Suncheon	Haeryong-myeon	Suncheon bound: 510m Yeosu bound: 445m
Dorong IC	도롱 나들목	Namhae Expressway (Expressway 10)	Suncheon	Haeryong-myeon	
Haeryong 2 TN	해룡2터널		Suncheon	Haeryong-myeon	Suncheon bound: 620m Yeosu bound: 630m
Haeryong IS Haeryong IC	해룡 교차로 해룡 나들목	Namhae Expressway (Expressway 10); Yeosun-ro	Suncheon	Haeryong-myeon	
Seongsan br	성산교		Suncheon	Haeryong-myeon	
Connect to the Alternative bypass to the National Route 2
