= Hwayang =

Hwayang may refer to:

- Hwayang-dong (화양동), haengjeongdong and beopjeongdong in Gwangjin District, Seoul, South Korea
- Hwayang-eup (화양읍), eup in Cheongdo County, North Gyeongsang Province, South Korea
- Hwayang-myeon, Seocheon (화양면), myeon in Seocheon County, South Chungcheong Province, South Korea
- Hwayang-myeon, Yeosu (화양면), myeon in Yeosu, South Jeolla Province, South Korea
