= Pyeonghwa station =

Railway station in South Korea

평화
Pyeonghwa
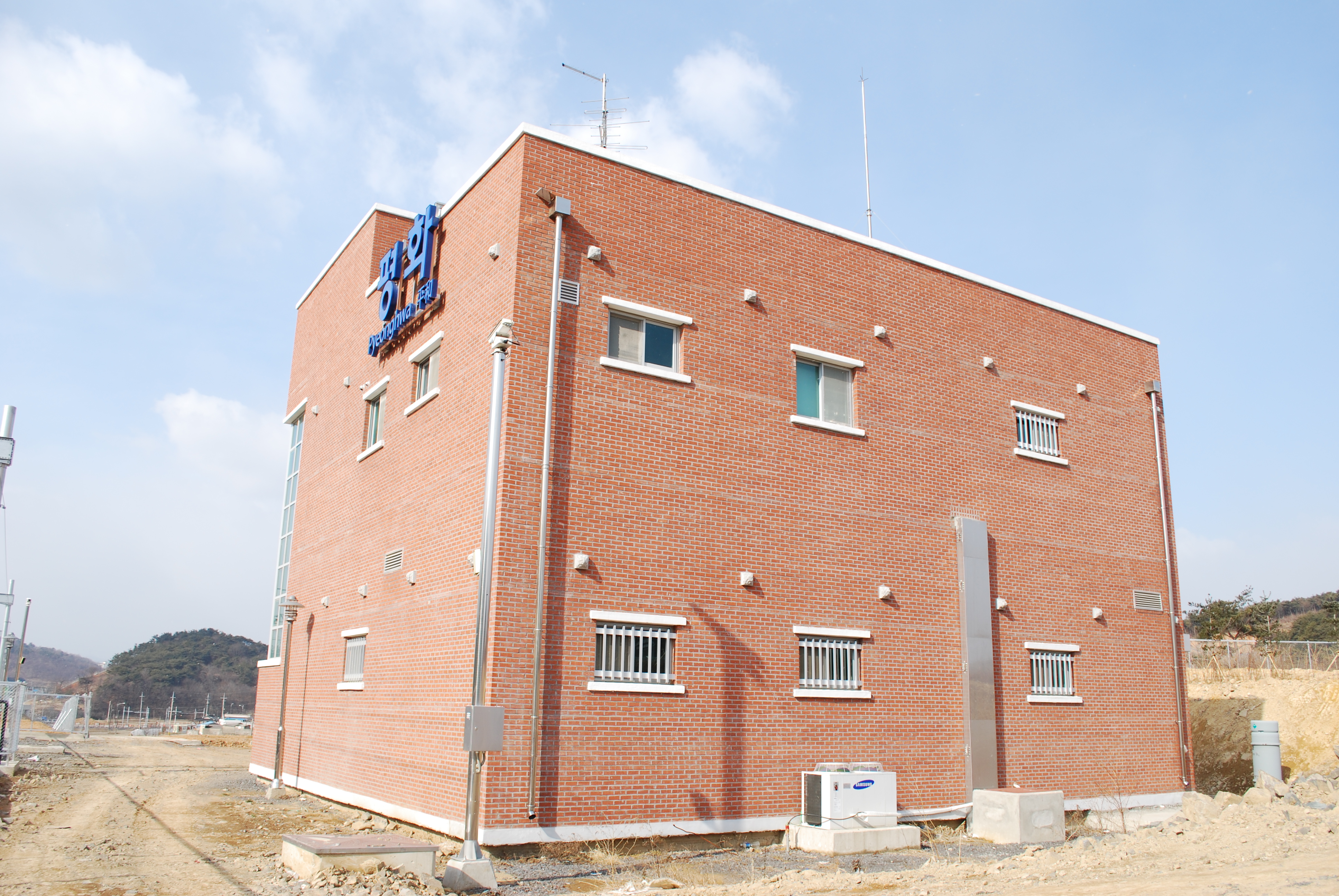
- Front view of station from Gyeongjeon line

Korean name
- Hangul: 평화역
- Hanja: 平和驛
- Revised Romanization: Pyeonghwa-yeok
- McCune–Reischauer: P'yŏnghwa-yŏk

General information
- Location: Shindae-ri, Haeryong myeon, Suncheon
- Coordinates: 34°56′34″N 127°33′3″E
- Operator: Korail
- Platforms: 0
- Tracks: 0

Construction
- Structure type: Aboveground/Straight

History
- Opened: February 9, 1967
Location

Pyeonghwa Station was a railway station on the Gyeongjeon Line in Haeryong-myeon, Suncheon, South Korea. It opened in February 1967 and closed on 20 December 2002, after which the station building was demolished.
