= Hwajeong-myeon, Yeosu =

Hwajeong-myeon
- Township (myeon)
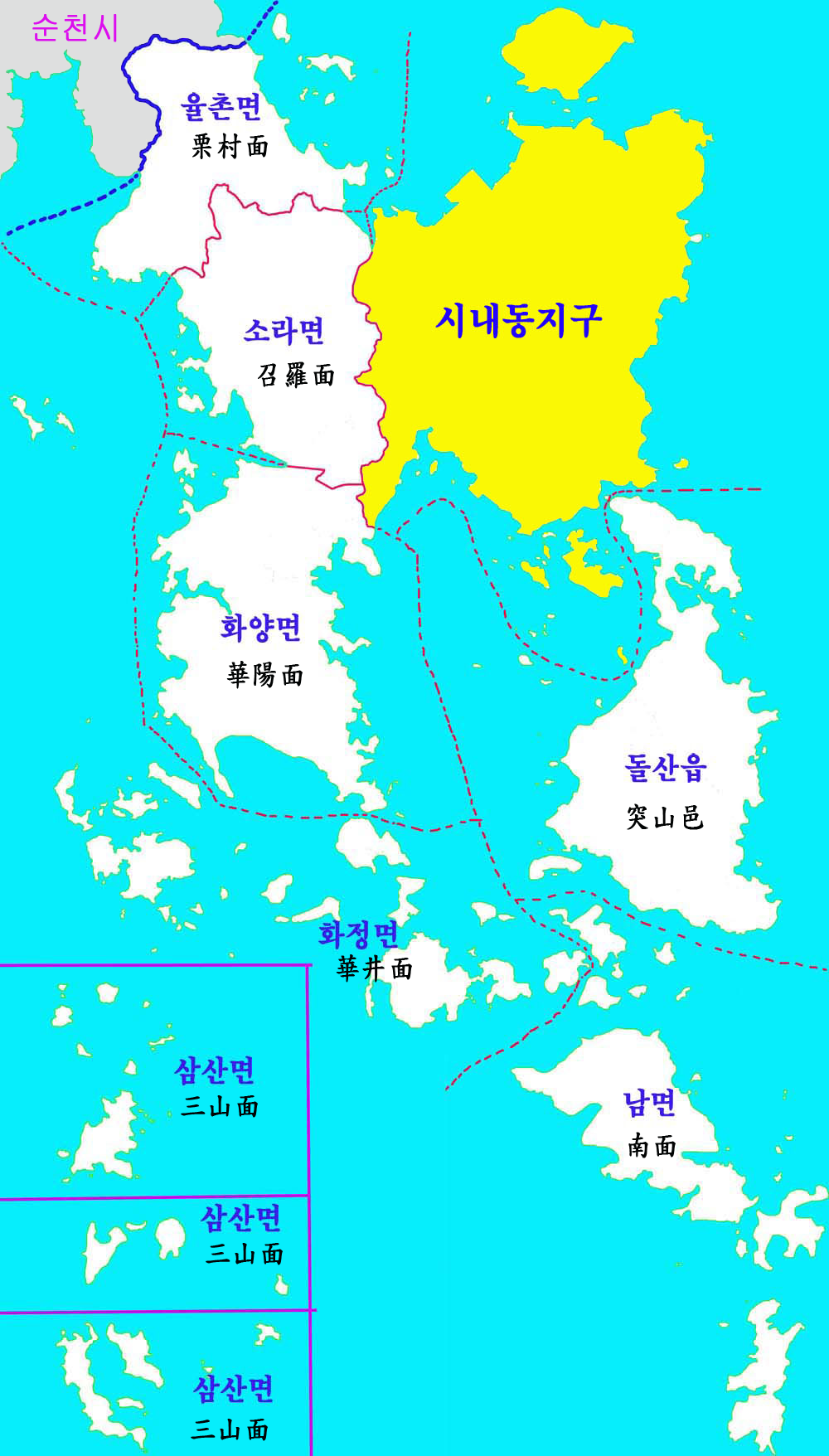
- 화정면 is this myeon.

- Location within South Korea
- Country: South Korea
- Province (do): South Jeolla
- City (si): Yeosu
- Administrative divisions: 10 jurisdiction: 20 administrative district; 72 ban

Area
  - Total: 27.48 km^{2} (10.61 sq mi)

Population (31 Dec 2010)
  - Total: 3,540
  - Density: 129/km^{2} (334/sq mi)
- Time zone: UTC+9 (Korea Standard Time)

Korean name
- Hangul: 화정면
- Hanja: 華井面
- RR: Hwajeong-myeon
- MR: Hwajŏng-myŏn

Hwajeong-myeon (Korean: 화정면), also called Hwajeong Township, or Hwajeong for short, is a myeon (English: township) in Yeosu, a city in the South Jeolla Province, South Korea.

== General ==
The township of Hwajeong-myeon is located in the south and south-western part of the city of Yeosu. The township is made up only of islands. It has a total area of 27.48 square kilometres (10.61 sq mi). As of December 2010, the population was 3,540 and the number of houses 1,764. The township hall is located in Baegya-ri, and the address of the township hall is 8-11, Baegya 3-gil, Hwajeong-myeon. Hwayang-myeon is situated in Jangsu Bay, in the northern region of Yeosu with Yeoja Bay to the north-west, Gamak Bay and Dolsan-eup to the north-east, Nam-myeon to the east, Yeongnam-myeon and Goheung County to the west, and the South Sea to the south.

== Transport ==
The major road in Hwajeong is National Route 77 which includes several bridges in the township such as Baegyadaegyo and is set to include bridges scheduled to be built, such as Palyeongdaegyo.

== Ri ==
Hwajeong-myeon is administered in ten jurisdictions and twenty administrative districts.

Beopjeongri	Korean	Haengjeongri	Notes
Gaedo-ri	개도리	Wolhang(월항), Sinheung(신흥), Hwasan(화산), Yeoseok(여석), Mojeon(모전), Horyeong(호령)	The main island is Gaedo.
Nangdo-ri	낭도리	Sado(사도), Yeosan(여산), Gyupo(규포)	The main island is Nangdo.
Baegya-ri	백야리	Baegya(백야), Hwabaek(화백)	It houses the Township hall. The main island is Baegyado. It is connected to Anpo-ri, Hwayang-myeon by the Baegyadaegyo bridge, as part of National Route 77.
Sanghwa-ri	상화리	Sanghwa(상화)	The main island is Sanghwado.
Yeoja-ri	여자리	Yeoja(여자)	The main islands are Daeyeojado and Soyeojado. It is located in the center of Yeoja Bay. Yeoja Bay was named after these two islands' names.
Wolho-ri	월호리	Wolho(월호), Jabong(자봉)	The main island is Wolhodo.
Jeokgeum-ri	적금리	Jeokgeum(적금)	The main island is Jeokgeumdo. The Palyeongdaegyo bridge, which is part of National Route 77, will eventually allow a connection to Yeongnam-myeon, Goheung County.
Jedo-ri	제도리	Jedo(제도)	The main island is Jedo.
Jobal-ri	조발리	Jobal(조발), Dunbyeong(둔병)	The main island is Jobaldo.
Hahwa-ri	하화리	Hahwa(하화)	The main island is Hahwado.
