= Geobukseon Bridge =

Geobukseon Bridge (Second Dolsan Bridge)
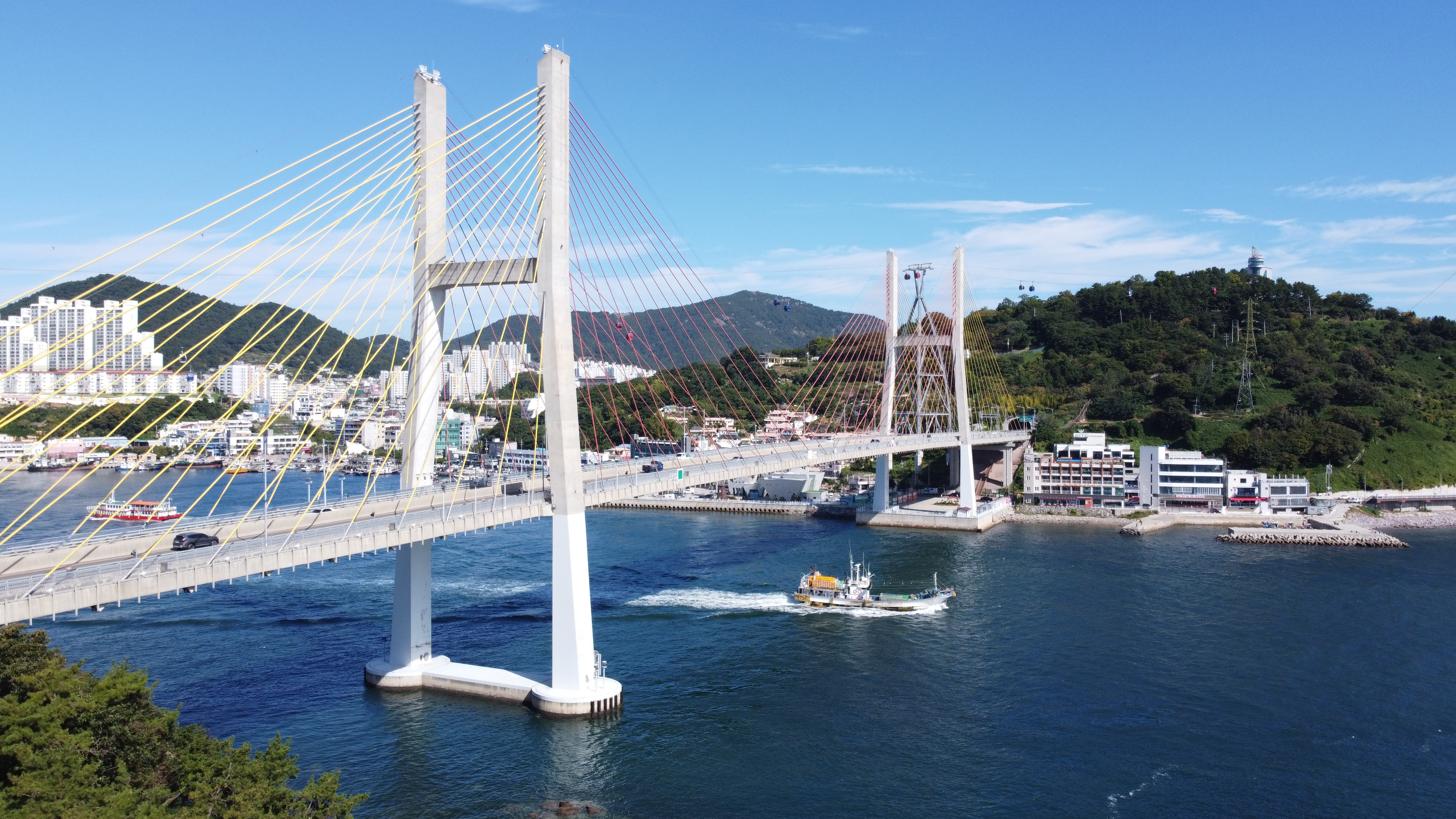
- Geobukseon Bridge, South Korea
- Coordinates: 34.73480°N 127.74884°E
- Carries: 4 lanes of motor vehicles
- Crosses: South Sea of Korea
- Locale: Yeosu, South Korea

Characteristics
- Design: Cable-stayed
- Material: Concrete
- Total length: approach 280 metres (920 ft) main 464 metres (1,522 ft)
- Width: 23.9 metres (78 ft)
- Clearance below: 22.0 metres (72.2 ft)

History
- Contracted lead designer: Daelim Industrial and Yooshin Engineering Corporation
- Constructed by: Daelim Industrial
- Construction start: 2008
- Construction end: 2012
- Construction cost: $60 million USD (including 460 metres (1,510 ft) approach tunnel
- Opened: 2012

Location
- Interactive map of Geobukseon Bridge (Second Dolsan Bridge)

The Geobukseon Bridge (Korean: 거북선대교), also called the Second Dolsan Bridge (제2돌산대교), is the main bridge on the Yeosu Road between Udu-ri, Dolsan and Jonghwa-dong, linking the Port of Yeosu with Dolsando across the Namhae sea. It is a floating cable-stayed bridge with a 464-meter (35+82+230+82+35m) length and its construction started in June 2008. It opened in April 2012 and carries four lanes of motor vehicle traffic. The new link was intended to reduce traffic congestion on the First Dolsan Bridge which opened in 1985, and act as an important infrastructure link during the Yeosu Expo which had been held from May, 2012 for three months. The bridge was built by contractor Daelim Industrial Co. Ltd for client Iksan Regional Construction & Management Administration. The contract cost was US$60 million, which includes a 460m long tunnel at one end, and a 280m long approach bridge.

== Construction ==
The caisson and cast-in-place concrete piles were used for the foundation of PY1 and PY2 respectively. For the foundation of PY1, two small caissons were chosen. A 1,300 ton floating crane was used to install the caisson foundations, which was cheaper and did not interfere with shipping at the site. Cast-in-place concrete piles were chosen for PY2 because the shallow depth of just 3.9m restricted access by the floating crane.

Construction of the pylon legs was carried out using automatic climbing system formwork, in lifts varying from 3m to 4m height. Each segment took about seven days to complete. When the climbing form reached a height of 72.9m, the concrete edge girder was installed by the form traveller supported by permanent stays was chosen – this self-launching system is designed for in situ casting of the segment using the free cantilever method.

MS type was chosen due to its competitiveness in the bidding. The accessory of cables were supplied by VSL and installed with a mono strand jack using strand by strand installation method. Strand installation and stressing were carried out after installation of the HDPE stay pipe. They are stressed from the upper end in the tower, where the concentration of anchorages makes the process more efficient. At the lower end, the cable is anchored below the edge girder.

== Design ==
The Geobukseon Bridge has been designed by Daelim Consortium – a team of Daelim Industrial Co., Ltd. and Yooshin Engineering Corporation. Contract cost is US$60million, which includes a 460m long tunnel at one end, and a 280m long approach bridge. The bridge had been with 744m long is divided into an approach bridge and a cable-stayed main bridge. The approach viaduct is 280m long, with 8 spans of 35m in length consisting of post-tension beams and cast-in-situ slabs. The main cable-stayed bridge has a 230m main span with two 117m-long side spansThe design velocity of the bridge is 60 km/h and the required navigation channel width is 120*22m. The main bridge has four lanes of traffic on a concrete deck which has an edge girder consisting of two edge beams that are approximately 1.5m deep and 24.2m wide, with a slab thickness of 0.25m. Supports of the deck consist of two pylons and four piers. The pylons are “H” type with a height of about 90m with a cross beam at the height of about 60m. The pylon cross-section has sections of 2.5~4.5 x 4.5m with a wall thickness 0.6m. The cables are dual plane, fan arrangement. There are 52 cables on each plane, ranging in size from 23 to 49 multi-strands of 15.7mm. The tensile strength of a strand is 1860 MPa and the total weight of the stay-cables is about 350 tons.

== Gallery ==
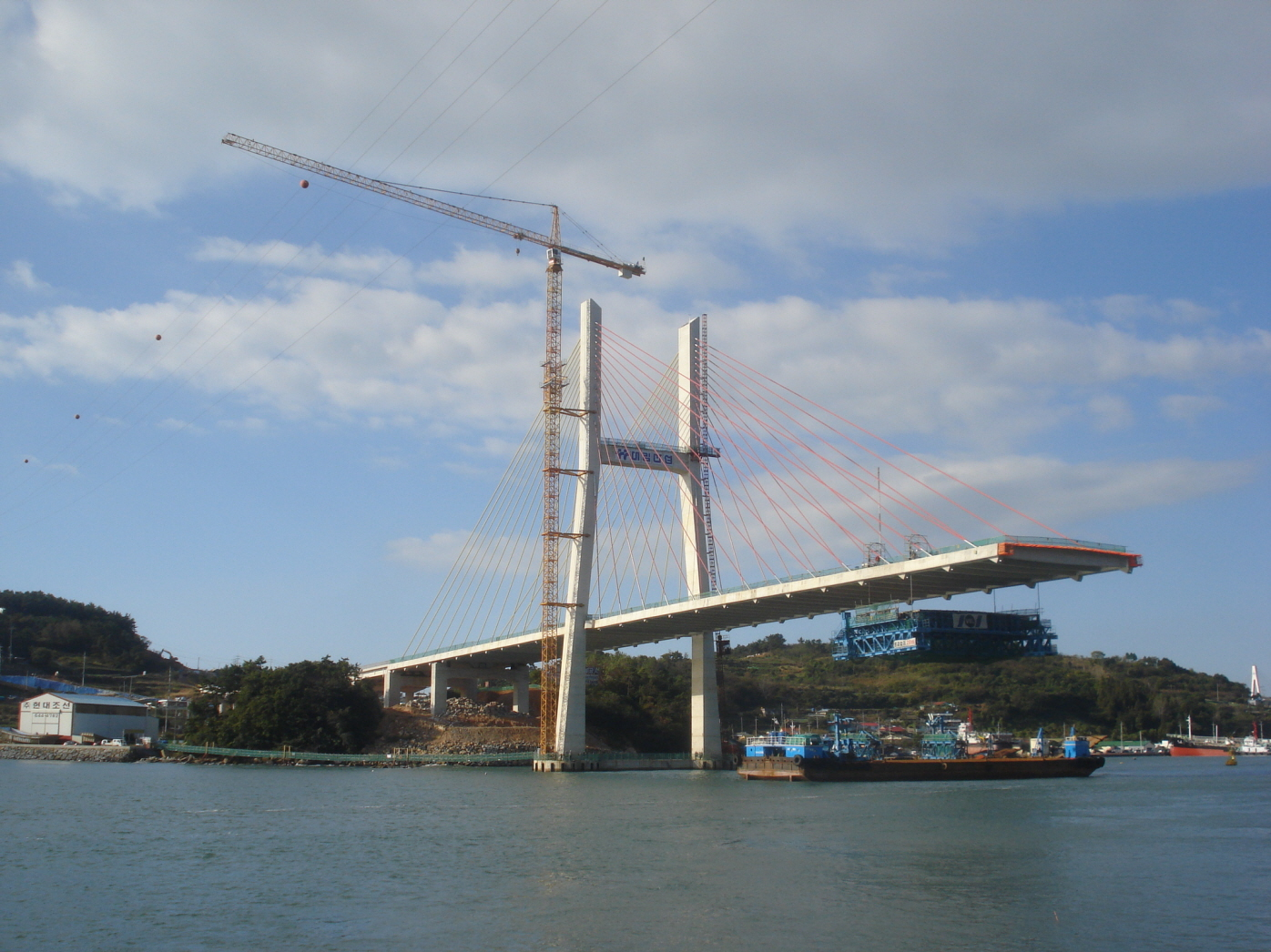
Geobukseon Bridge _View1

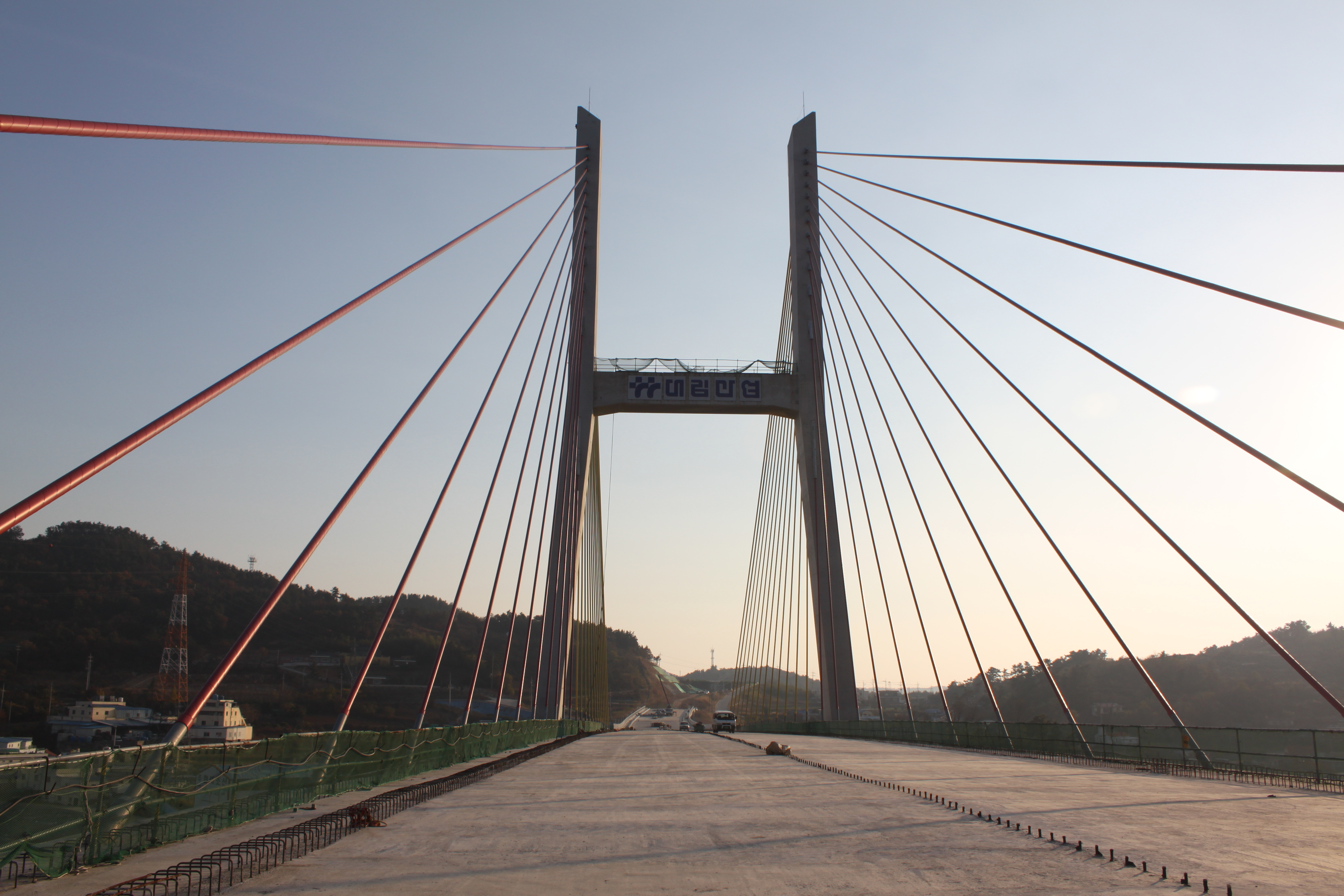
Geobukseon Bridge _View4

== See also ==
- Transportation in South Korea
- List of bridges in South Korea
