= Sora-myeon =

Coordinates: 34.7928°N 127.6327°E

- Township (myeon)
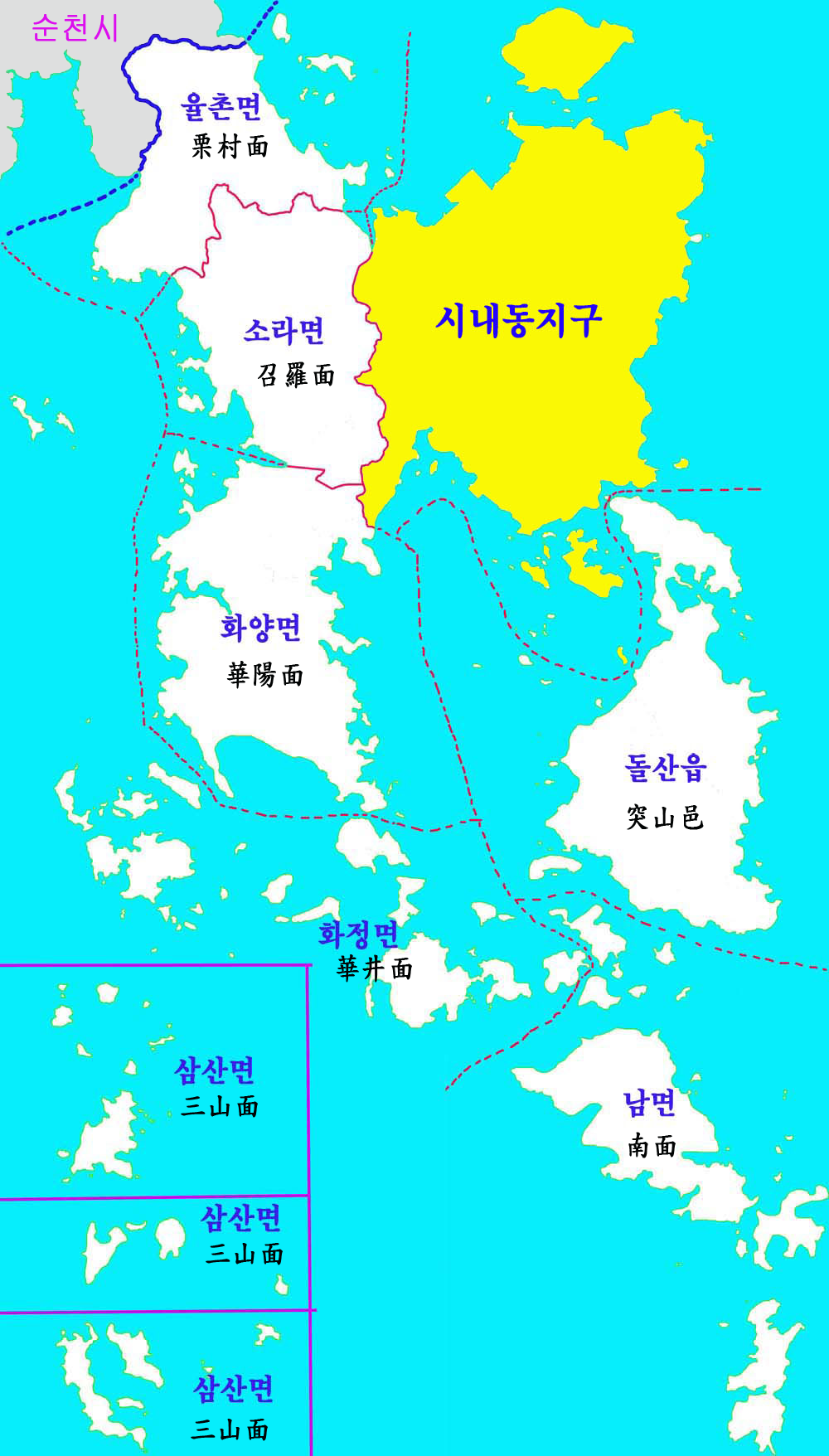
- Country: South Korea
- Province (do): South Jeolla
- City (si): Yeosu
- Administrative divisions: 10 jurisdictions: 42 administrative districts

Area
  - Total: 60.5 km^{2} (23.4 sq mi)

Population (31 Dec 2010)
  - Total: 12,256
  - Density: 203/km^{2} (525/sq mi)
- Time zone: UTC+9 (Korea Standard Time)

Korean name
- Hangul: 소라면
- Hanja: 召羅面
- RR: Sora-myeon
- MR: Sora-myŏn

Sora-myeon (Korean: 소라면), also called as Sora Township, or shortly Sora, is a myeon (township) in Yeosu city of South Jeolla Province, South Korea. The myeon is located in center-western part of the city. The total area of the myeon is 60.5 square kilometres, and, as of the last day of 2010, the population was 12256 people, 5195 houses. The township hall is located in Deogyang-ri. Hwayang-myeon is south and Yulchon-myeon, is north, Samil-dong and the Gwangyang Bay is north-east, Jusam-dong and Yeocheon-dong is east, Ssangbong-dong is south-Easter, and the Yeoja Bay is west.

== History ==
- 1899: Gusan-myeon (Northern part) and Deogan-myeon (Southern part)
- 1915: Sora-myeon, Yeosu-gun, Jeollanam-do
- 15 August 1949: Sora-myeon, Yeocheon-gun, Jeollanam-do: Yeosu-gun was split into Yeosu-si and Yeocheon-gun.
- 1 April 1998: Sora-myeon, Yeosu-si, Jeollanam-do: Yeosu-si, Yeocheon-si, and Yeocheon-gun were merged to Yeosu-si.

== Ri ==
It has eight jurisdictions and forty two administrative districts.

Beopjeongri	Korean	Haengjeongri	Note
Gwangi-ri	관기리	Gwangi(관기)1~3	
Daepo-ri	대포리	Daepo(대포)1~4	
Deogyang-ri	덕양리	Deogyang(덕양)1~6	Township hall
Boksan-ri	복산리	Boksan(복산)1~6	
Bongdu-ri	봉두리	Bongdu(봉두)1~3	
Sagok-ri	사곡리	Sagok(사곡)1~4	
Jungnim-ri	죽림리	Jungnim(죽림)1~13	
Hyeoncheon-ri	현천리	Hyeoncheon(현천)1~3	

=== Gwangi-ri ===
Gwangi-ri (Korean: 관기리) has three administrative districts: Gwangi(관기)1~3.

=== Daepo-ri ===
Daepo-ri (Korean: 대포리) has four administrative districts: Daepo(대포)1~4. It has Daepo Tunnel with Yulchon-myeon on the Expo-daero.

=== Deogyang-ri ===
Deogyang-ri (Korean: 덕양리) has six administrative districts: Deogyang(덕양)1~6. It has Sora township hall. It has Deogyang Station on Jeolla Line and on Yeocheon Line. It has Deogyang Intersection on Expo-daero, Yeosun-ro and Deogyang-ro.

=== Boksan-ri ===
Boksan-ri (Korean: 복산리) has six administrative districts: Boksan(복산)1~6.

=== Bongdu-ri ===
Bongdu-ri (Korean: 봉두리) has three administrative districts: Bongdu(봉두)1~3.

=== Sagok-ri ===
Sagok-ri (Korean: 사곡리) has four administrative districts: Sagok(사곡)1~4.

=== Jungnim-ri ===
Jungnim-ri (Korean: 죽림리) has thirteen administrative districts: Jungnim(죽림)1~13.

=== Hyeoncheon-ri ===
Hyeoncheon-ri (Korean: 현천리) has three administrative districts: Hyeoncheon(현천)1~3.

== Transport ==
It has Deogyang Station on the Jeolla Line and the Yeocheon Line in Deogyang-ri, and address of it is 56, Yeosun-ro. It has a motorway named Expo-daero, the part of the National Route 17 and the part of the Gukjido 22, is located in Deogyang-ri and Daepo-ri. You can go in or out to this motorway at the Deogyang Intersection, the entrance and the exit of Expo-daero, in Deogyang-ri by using Yeosun-ro or Deogyang-ro. Hwayang-ro, Dowon-ro and Deogyang-ro are the part of the Gukjido 22, too. Okcheon-ro, Hwayang-ro and Seobu-ro are the part of the Jibangdo 863. It has also Yeosun-ro, former part of the National Route 17.
