= Yulchon-myeon =

- Township (myeon)
- Interactive map of Yulchon-myeon
- Coordinates: 34°50′55″N 127°34′38″E
- Country: South Korea
- Province (do): South Jeolla
- City (si): Yeosu
- Administrative divisions: 10 jurisdictions: 24 administrative districts; 118 ban

Area
  - Total: 46.5 km^{2} (18.0 sq mi)

Population (31 Dec 2010)
  - Total: 7,404
  - Density: 159/km^{2} (412/sq mi)
- Time zone: UTC+9 (Korea Standard Time)

Korean name
- Hangul: 율촌면
- Hanja: 栗村面
- RR: Yulchon-myeon
- MR: Yulch'on-myŏn

Yulchon-myeon (Korean: 율촌면), also called Yulchon Township, or shortly Yulchon, is a myeon (township) in Yeosu city of South Jeolla Province, South Korea. The myeon is located in the north-western part of the city. The total area of Yulchon-myeon is 46.5 square kilometers, and, as of the last day of 2010, the population was 7404 people. It has Yeosu Airport in Sinpung-ri. Township hall is located in Johwa-ri. Sora-myeon is to the south and Haeryong-myeon, Suncheon to the north, Gwangyang-eup, Gwangyang is to the north-east, Suncheon Bay and Yeoja Bay to the west, and Gwangyang Bay is to the east.

== History ==
- 1897: Yulchon-myeon, Yeosu-gun, Jeollanam-do
- 15 August 1949: Yulchon-myeon, Yeocheon-gun, Jeollanam-do: Yeosu-gun was split into Yeosu-si and Yeocheon-gun.
- 1 April 1998: Yulchon-myeon, Yeosu-si, Jeollanam-do: Yeosu-si, Yeocheon-si, and Yeocheon-gun were merged to Yeosu-si.

== Ri ==
It has ten jurisdictions and thirty seven administrative districts.

Beopjeongri	Korean	Haengjeongri	Note
Gajang-ri	가장리	Gajang(가장), Nanhwa(난화), Jungsan(중산), Yeonhwa(연화)	
Banwol-ri	반월리	Banwol(반월), Samsan(삼산)	
Bongjeon-ri	봉전리	Bongjeon(봉전), Gwangam(광암)	
Sansu-ri	산수리	Sansu(산수)1~2, Bongdu(봉두)	
Sangbong-ri	상봉리	Sangbong(상봉)1~2	
Sinpung-ri	신풍리	Sinpung(신풍)1, Guam(구암)1~2, Sinheung(신흥), Deoksan(덕산), Aeyang(애양), Doseong(도성)	Yeosu Airport, Sinpung Station (abandoned)
Yeodong-ri	여동리	Songdo(송도)	
Wolsan-ri	월산리	Cheongsan(청산)1~2, Wolsan(월산)1~4	
Johwa-ri	조화리	Johwa(조화), Yeoheung(여흥)1~4	Township hall, Yulchon Station
Chwijeok-ri	취적리	Chwijeok(취적)1~2, Sinsan(신산)1~3	

=== Gajang-ri ===
Gajang-ri (Korean: 가장리) has four administrative districts: Gajang(가장), Nanhwa(난화), Jungsan(중산) and Yeonhwa(연화).

=== Banwol-ri ===
Banwol-ri (Korean: 반월리) has two administrative districts: Banwol(반월) and Samsan(삼산).

=== Bongjeon-ri ===
Bongjeon-ri (Korean: 봉전리) has two administrative districts: Bongjeon(봉전) and Gwangam(광암).

=== Sansu-ri ===
Sansu-ri (Korean: 산수리) has three administrative districts: Sansu(산수)1~2 and Bongdu(봉두). It has Yulchon Tunnel on Expo-daero with Yongjeon-ri, Haeryong-myeon, Suncheon.

=== Sangbong-ri ===
Sangbong-ri (Korean: 상봉리) has two administrative districts: Sangbong(상봉)1~2.

=== Sinpung-ri ===
Sinpung-ri (Korean: 신풍리) has seven administrative districts:.Sinpung(신풍)1, Guam(구암)1~2, Sinheung(신흥), Deoksan(덕산), Aeyang(애양) and Doseong(도성). It has Yeosu Airport and it had abandoned Sinpung Station. It has Daepo Tunnel on Expo-daero with Daepo-ri, Sora-myeon. It has Sangok Tunnel on Expo-daero with Chwijeok-ri.

=== Yeodong-ri ===
Yeodong-ri (Korean: 여동리) has only one administrative districts: Songdo(송도).

=== Wolsan-ri ===
Wolsan-ri (Korean: 월산리) has six administrative districts: Cheongsan(청산)1~2 and Wolsan(월산)1~4. It has Chwijeok Tunnel on Expo-daero with Chwijeok-ri. It has Yulchon Intersection on Expo-daero and Seobu-ro.

=== Johwa-ri ===
Johwa-ri (Korean: 조화리) has five administrative districts: Johwa(조화) and Yeoheung(여흥)1~4. It has Yulchon township hall and Yulchon Station.

=== Chwijeok-ri ===
Chwijeok-ri (Korean: 취적리) has five administrative districts: Chwijeok(취적)1~2, Sinsan(신산)1~3. It has Sangok Tunnel on Expo-daero with Sinpung-ri. It has Chwijeok Tunnel on Expo-daero with Wolsan-ri.

== Transport ==
It has Yeosu Airport in Sinpung-ri. It has Yulchon station on Jeolla Line in Johwa-ri. Sinpung Station on Jeolla Line in Sinpung-ri was abandoned. The motorway named Expo-daero pass this myeon and it is on National Route 17 and Gukjido 22. Yulchon Intersection on the Expo-daero is in the Wolsan-ri. Seobu-ro and Haeryong-ro is on the Jibangdo 863. Yeosun-ro was the former National Route 17 and Gukjido 22 segment, but it was abolished when the Expo-daero was opened in 2012. Expo-daero pass four jurisdictions: Sinpung-ri, Chwijeok-ri, Wolsan-ri and Sansu-ri. It has four tunnels on Expo-daero: Daepo Tunnel, Sangok Tunnel, Chwijeok Tunnel and Yulchon Tunnel.
