= Port of Yeosu =

- Click on the map for a fullscreen view

Location
- Country: South Korea
- Location: Yeosu, South Jeolla
- Coordinates: 34°43′N 127°45′E
- UN/LOCODE: KRYOS

The Port of Yeosu (Korean: 여수항; Hanja: 麗水港) is a port in South Korea, located in the city of Yeosu, South Jeolla Province.
