= Hwayang-myeon, Yeosu =

Hwayang-myeon
- Township (myeon)
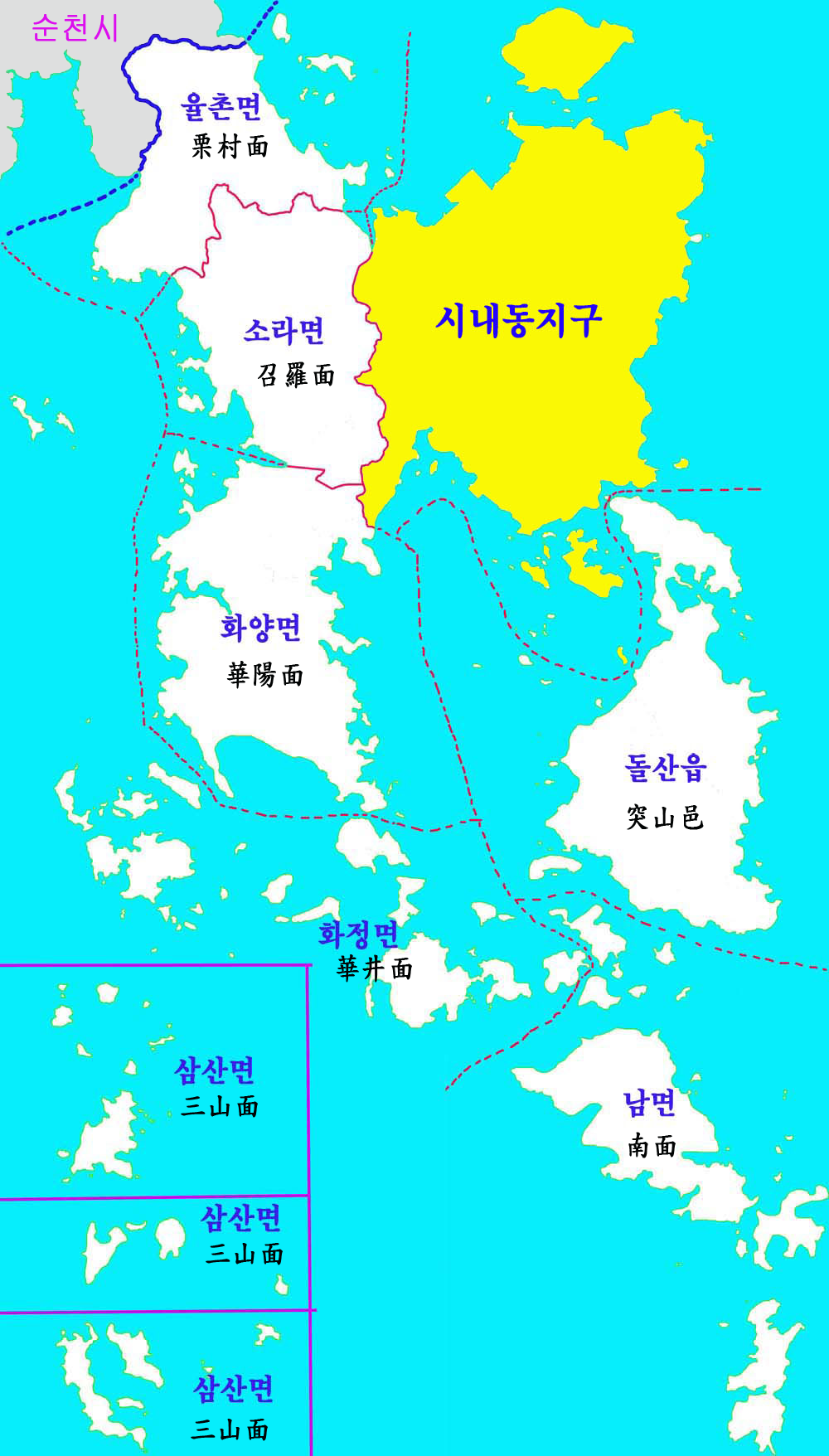
- Coordinates: 34°42′29″N 127°36′32″E
- Country: South Korea
- Province (do): South Jeolla
- City (si): Yeosu
- Administrative divisions: 10 jurisdictions: 31 administrative districts

Area
  - Total: 70.1 km^{2} (27.1 sq mi)

Population (31 Dec 2010)
  - Total: 8,108
  - Density: 116/km^{2} (300/sq mi)
- Time zone: UTC+9 (Korea Standard Time)

Korean name
- Hangul: 화양면
- Hanja: 華陽面
- RR: Hwayang-myeon
- MR: Hwayang-myŏn

Hwayang-myeon (Korean: 화양면), also called as Hwayang Township, or shortly Hwayang, is a myeon (township) in Yeosu city of South Jeolla Province, South Korea. The myeon is located in south-western part of the city. The total area of the myeon is 70.1 square kilometres, and, as of the last day of 2010, the population was 8108 people, 3559 houses. The township hall is located in Najin-ri, and address of the township hall is 16-10, Najin-gil, Hwayang-myeon. Hwajeong-myeon and Jangsu Bay is southern section, Sora-myeon is northern section, Ssangbong-dong is north-eastern section, the Gamak Bay is eastern section, and the Yeoja Bay is western section.

== History ==
- 1897: Hwayang-myeon, Yeosu-gun, Jeollanam-do
- 1910: Township hall was opened.
- 15 August 1949: Hwayang-myeon, Yeocheon-gun, Jeollanam-do: Yeosu-gun was split into Yeosu-si and Yeocheon-gun.
- 1 April 1998: Hwayang-myeon, Yeosu-si, Jeollanam-do: Yeosu-si, Yeocheon-si, and Yeocheon-gun were merged to Yeosu-si.

== Ri ==
It has ten jurisdictions and thirty one administrative districts.

Beopjeongri	Korean	Haengjeongri	Note
Najin-ri	나진리	Najin(나진), Sojang(소장)	Township hall
Seochon-ri	서촌리	Seochon(서촌), Seokgyo(석교), Bongo(봉오)	
Anpo-ri	안포리	Sepo(세포), Wonpo(원포), Anpo(안포)	
Okjeok-ri	옥적리	Masang(마상), Okjeok(옥적), Daeok(대옥), Sangjeon(상전)	
Yongju-ri	용주리	Yongju(용주), Gonae(고내), Hodu(호두), Hwaryeon(화련)	
Imok-ri	이목리	Imok(이목), Seoyeon(서연), Gumi(구미), Beolga(벌가)	
Icheon-ri	이천리	Ocheon(오천), Icheon(이천), Gamdo(감도)	
Jangsu-ri	장수리	Jangsu(장수), Sumun(수문), Jangcheok(장척), Jangdeung(장등)	
Changmu-ri	창무리	Changmu(창무), Baekcho(백초)	
Hwadong-ri	화동리	Hwadong(화동), Cheongyang(청양)	

=== Najin-ri ===
Najin-ri (Korean: 나진리 has two administrative districts: Najin(나진), Sojang(소장). It has Hwayang township hall.

=== Seochon-ri ===
Seochon-ri (Korean: 서촌리 has three administrative districts: Seochon(서촌), Seokgyo(석교), Bongo(봉오).

=== Anpo-ri ===
Anpo-ri (Korean: 안포리 has three administrative districts: Sepo(세포), Wonpo(원포), Anpo(안포). It has Baegyadaegyo on Baegya-ro on the National Route 77 and Jibangdo 863 with Baegyado in Baegya-ri, Hwajeong-myeon.

=== Okjeok-ri ===
Okjeok-ri (Korean: 옥적리 has four administrative districts: Masang(마상), Okjeok(옥적), Daeok(대옥), Sangjeon(상전).

=== Yongju-ri ===
Yongju-ri (Korean: 용주리 has four administrative districts: Yongju(용주), Gonae(고내), Hodu(호두), Hwaryeon(화련).

=== Imok-ri ===
Imok-ri (Korean: 이목리 has four administrative districts: Imok(이목), Seoyeon(서연), Gumi(구미), Beolga(벌가).

=== Icheon-ri ===
Icheon-ri (Korean: 이천리 has three administrative districts: Ocheon(오천), Icheon(이천), Gamdo(감도).

=== Jangsu-ri ===
Jangsu-ri (Korean: 장수리 has four administrative districts: Jangsu(장수), Sumun(수문), Jangcheok(장척), Jangdeung(장등). Jangsu Bay was named after this ri. It will have Hwayangdaegyo on the National Route 77 with Jobaldo in Jobal-ri, Hwajeong-myeon.

=== Changmu-ri ===
Changmu-ri (Korean: 창무리 has two administrative districts: Changmu(창무), Baekcho(백초).

=== Hwadong-ri ===
Hwadong-ri (Korean: 화동리 has two administrative districts: Hwadong(화동), Cheongyang(청양).

== Transport ==
It doesn't have any railways, expressways nor the motorways. It has National Route 77, Gukjido 22 and Jibangdo 863. It has a bridge named Baegyadaegyo on the National Route 77 and the Jibangdo 863. Baegyadaegyo connect Anpo-ri and Baegyado in Baegya-ri, Hwajeong-myeon. It will have Hwayangdaegyo on the National Route 77 connecting Jangsu-ri and Jobaldo in Jobal-ri, Hwajeong-myeon.

== Islands ==
The population of all of these islands below are the zero. (They are no-personed islands.)

Name	Korean	Location	Note
Gando	간도	San 169, Icheon-ri	
Daeryakdo	대락도	San 555, Imok-ri	
Mokdo	목도	San 478, Anpo-ri and else	
Samdo	삼도	San 856, Anpo-ri	
Samdocheotseom	삼도첫섬	San 853 Anpo-ri and else	
Sorakdo	소락도	San 556, Imok-ri	
Soundudo	소운두도	San 194, Icheon-ri and else	
Aegisamseom	애기삼섬	San 855, Anpo-ri	
Odo	오도	San 18, Icheon-ri	
Orando	오란도	San 857, Anpo-ri	
Jaraeseom	자래섬	San 202, Icheon-ri	
