= Haeryong-myeon =

- Township (myeon)
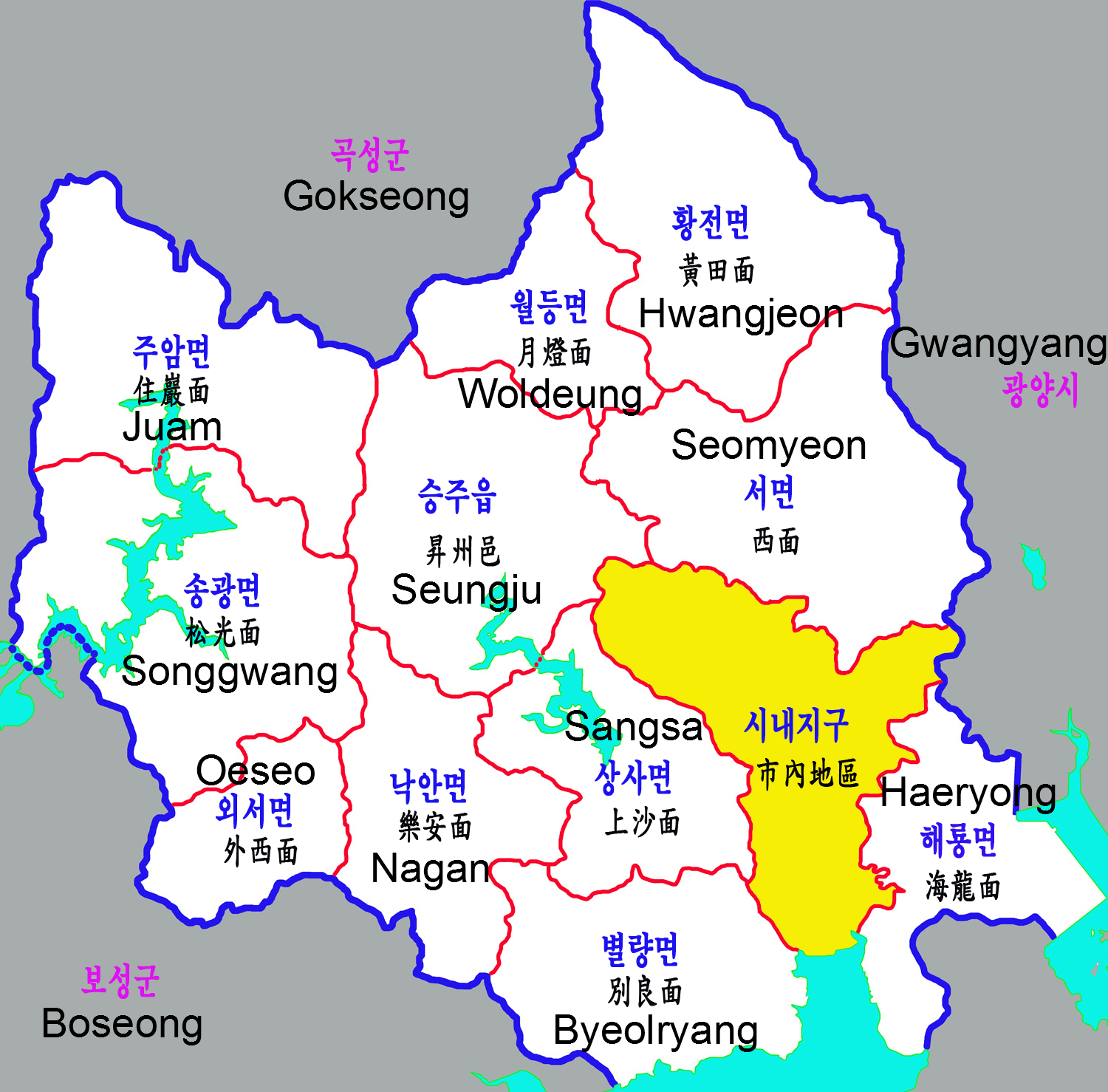
- Haeryong-myeon in the map of Suncheon
- Coordinates: 34°54′47″N 127°32′22″E
- Country: South Korea
- Province (do): South Jeolla
- City (si): Suncheon
- Administrative divisions: 18 jurisdiction: 83 administrative district; 197 ban

Area
  - Total: 49.93 km^{2} (19.28 sq mi)

Population (31 Dec 2016)
  - Total: 46,994
  - Density: 941.2/km^{2} (2,438/sq mi)
- Time zone: UTC+9 (Korea Standard Time)

Korean name
- Hangul: 해룡면
- Hanja: 海龍面
- RR: Haeryong-myeon
- MR: Haeryong-myŏn

Haeryong-myeon (Korean: 해룡면), also called Haeryong Township, or Haeryong for short, is a myeon (township) in Suncheon, a city in South Jeolla Province, South Korea. The township is located in the south-eastern part of the city with a total area of 49.93 square kilometres (19.28 sq mi). As of the last day of the year 2016, the population was recorded to be 46,994 people and the number of houses totaled 16,204. It is the myeon with the largest population in South Korea. The myeon office is located in 1228-10, Haeryong-ro in Woljeon-ri. There is Suncheon Bay in the south-west of the myeon; Yulchon-myeon, Yeosu in the south; Gwangyang Bay in the east; Gwangyang-eup, Gwangyang in the north-east; and Dosa-dong, Pungdeok-dong, Deogyeon-dong, Wangjo 2-dong, and Wangjo 1-dong in the west and the north-west.

== History ==
- 1896 : Haechon-myeon and Yongdu-myeon, Suncheon-gun
- 1 April 1914 : Haeryong-myeon, Suncheon-gun
- 15 August 1949 : Haeryong-myeon, Seungju-gun
- 1 January 1995 : Haeryong-myeon, Suncheon-si

== Ri ==
Haeryong-myeon has eighteen jurisdictions and eighty-three administrative districts.

=== Bokseong-ri ===
Bokseong-ri (Korean: 복성리) has two administrative districts: Bokseong-ri, and Sangbi-ri. It also has East Suncheon Interchange on Suncheon–Wanju Expressway and Suncheon Bokseong High School.

=== Sangsam-ri ===
Sangsam-ri (Korean: 상삼리) has twenty-four administrative districts: Sangsam 1-ri to Sangsam 23-ri, and Samdong-ri. It also has Sangsam branch office (Korean: 상삼출장소).

=== Sindae-ri ===
Sindae-ri (Korean: 신대리) has twenty-seven administrative districts: Pyeonghwa-ri, Bongseo-ri, Sandu-ri, Wolsan-ri, and Sindae 1-ri to Sindae 23-ri. It also has Sindae branch office (Korean: 신대출장소) since 16 January 2017.

=== Daean-ri ===
Daean-ri (Korean: 대안리) has four administrative districts: Daean-ri, Soan-ri, Masan-ri, and Pungdeok-ri.

=== Namga-ri ===
Namga-ri (Korean: 남가리) has three administrative districts: Namga-ri, Seoga-ri, and Daega-ri.

=== Woljeon-ri ===
Woljeon-ri (Korean: 월전리) has three administrative districts: Woljeon-ri, Sinheung-ri, and Singi-ri. It also has myeon office.

=== Seongsan-ri ===
Seongsan-ri (Korean: 성산리) has two administrative districts: Seongsan-ri, and Daebeop-ri. It also has Haeryong Interchange on Namhae Expressway.

=== Seonwol-ri ===
Seonwol-ri (Korean: 선월리) has two administrative districts: Seonwol-ri, and Tongcheon-ri.

=== Sinseong-ri ===
Sinseong-ri (Korean: 신성리) has only one administrative district: Sinseong-ri. It also has Suncheon Waeseong.

=== Hodu-ri ===
Hodu-ri (Korean: 호두리) has three administrative districts: Hodu-ri, Dangdu-ri, and Gusang-ri.

=== Yongjeon-ri ===
Yongjeon-ri (Korean: 용전리) has two administrative districts: Yongjeon-ri, and Sinwol-ri.

=== Dorong-ri ===
Dorong-ri (Korean: 도롱리) has only one administrative district: Dorong-ri. It also has Dorong Interchange on Namhae Expressway.

=== Jungheung-ri ===
Jungheung-ri (Korean: 중흥리) has only one administrative district: Jungheung-ri.

=== Haechang-ri ===
Haechang-ri (Korean: 해창리) has only one administrative district: Haechang-ri.

=== Seonhak-ri ===
Seonhak-ri (Korean: 선학리) has two administrative districts: Seonhak-ri, and Gyedang-ri.

=== Nongju-ri ===
Nongju-ri (Korean: 농주리) has two administrative districts: Nongju-ri, and Nowol-ri.

=== Sangnae-ri ===
Sangnae-ri (Korean: 상내리) has two administrative districts: Sangnae-ri, and Waon-ri.

=== Hasa-ri ===
Hasa-ri (Korean: 하사리) has only one administrative district: Hasa-ri.
