= Yeosu Maritime Cable Car =

Gondola lift in Yeosu, South Korea

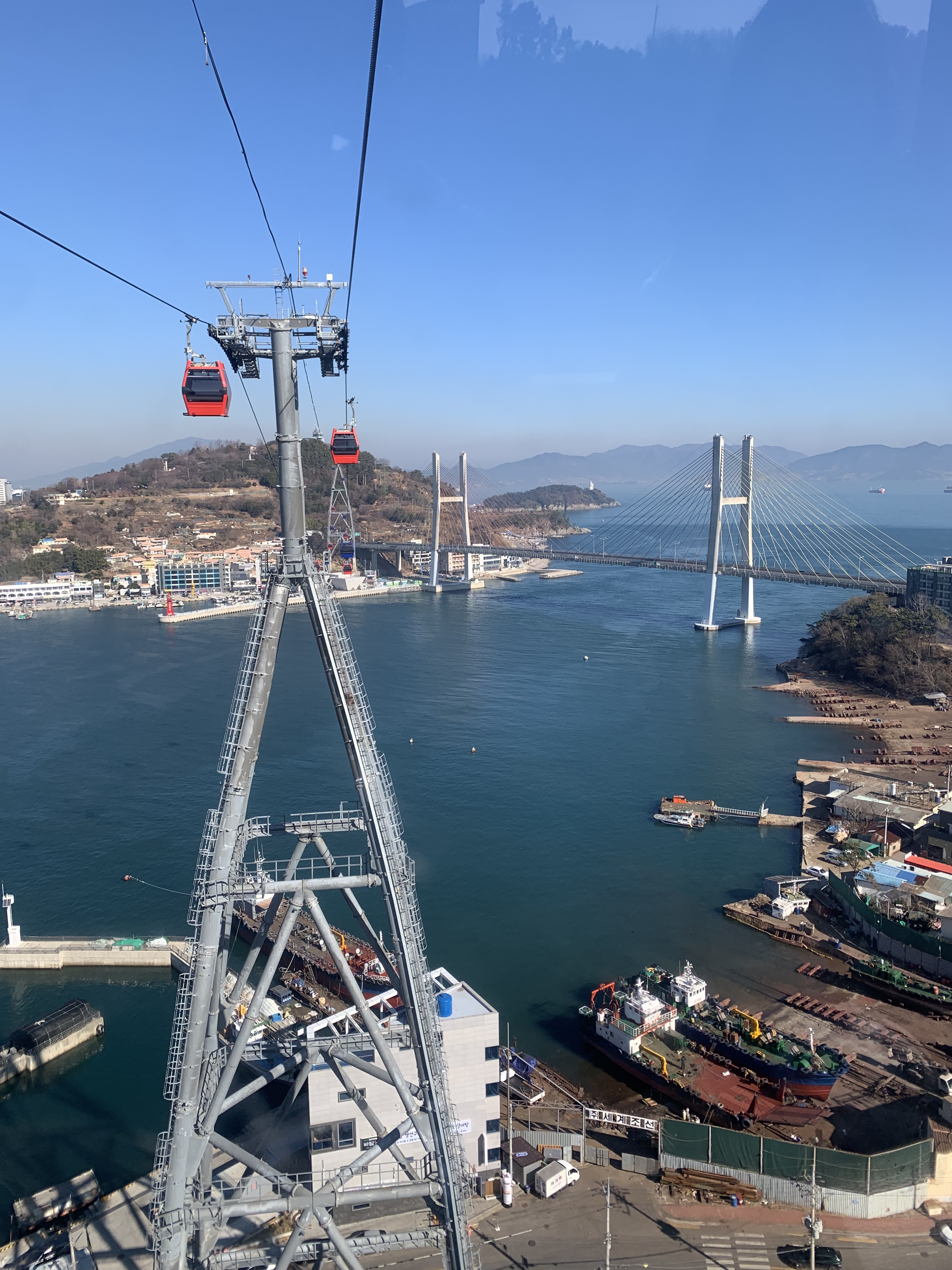
- View of the cabin going to the island from the mainland (2022)
- Interactive map of Yeosu Maritime Cable Car

Overview
- Country: South Korea
- Coordinates: 34.74057°N 127.75280°E
- Termini: Jasan Park; Dolsan Park
- Website: yeosucablecar.com/en (in English)

The Yeosu Maritime Cable Car (Korean: 여수 해상케이블카) is an gondola lift in Yeosu, South Jeolla Province, South Korea.

The lift connects the Dolsan Park on the island Dolsando to Jasan Park on the mainland. It is the first in South Korea to pass over water. It is the fourth maritime aerial lift in East Asia.

Some of the cabins ("crystal" cars) have transparent bottoms. Tickets for these must be specially purchased.

== Gallery ==
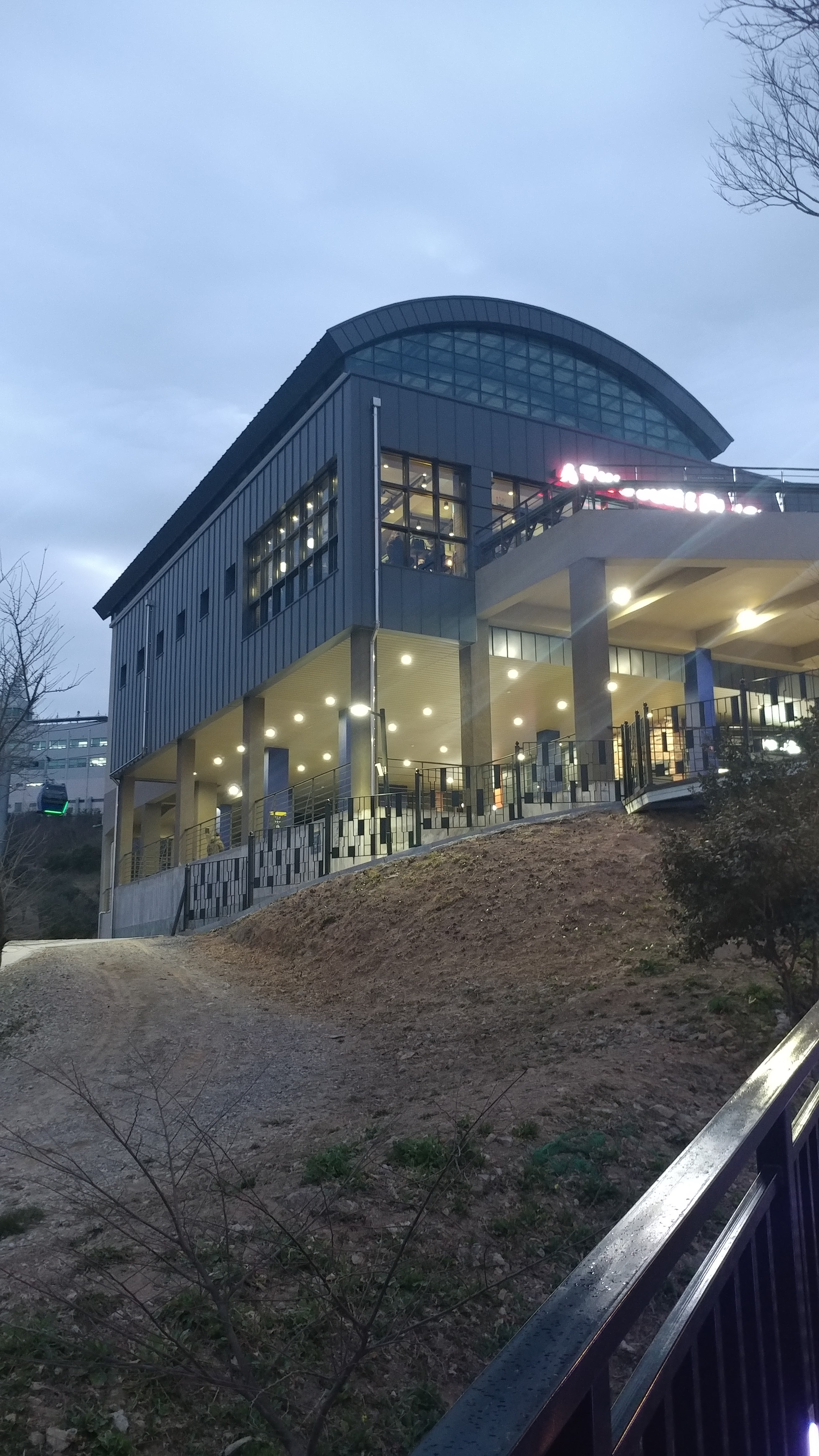
One of the cablecar stations (2017)

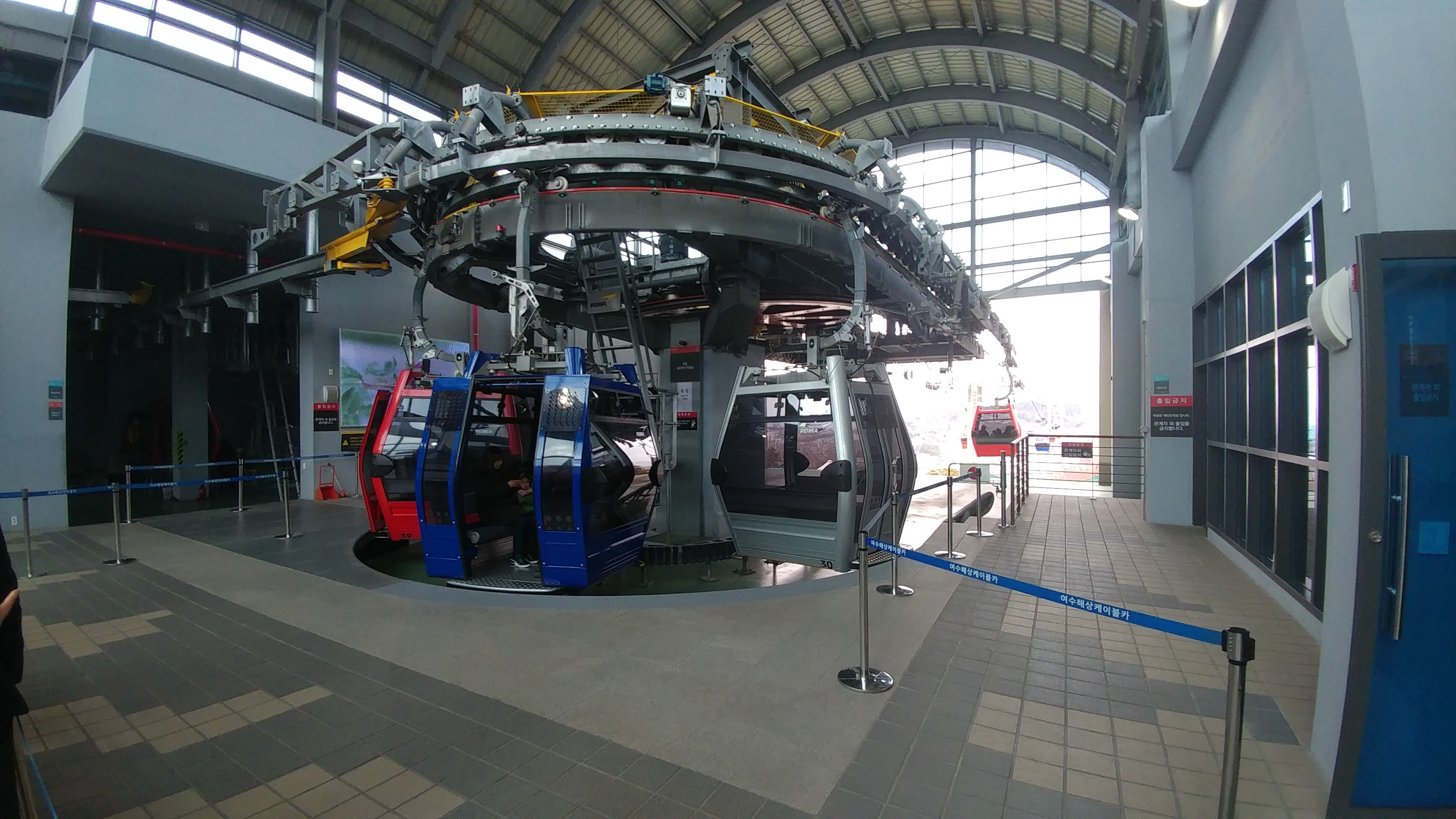
One of the platforms (2017)

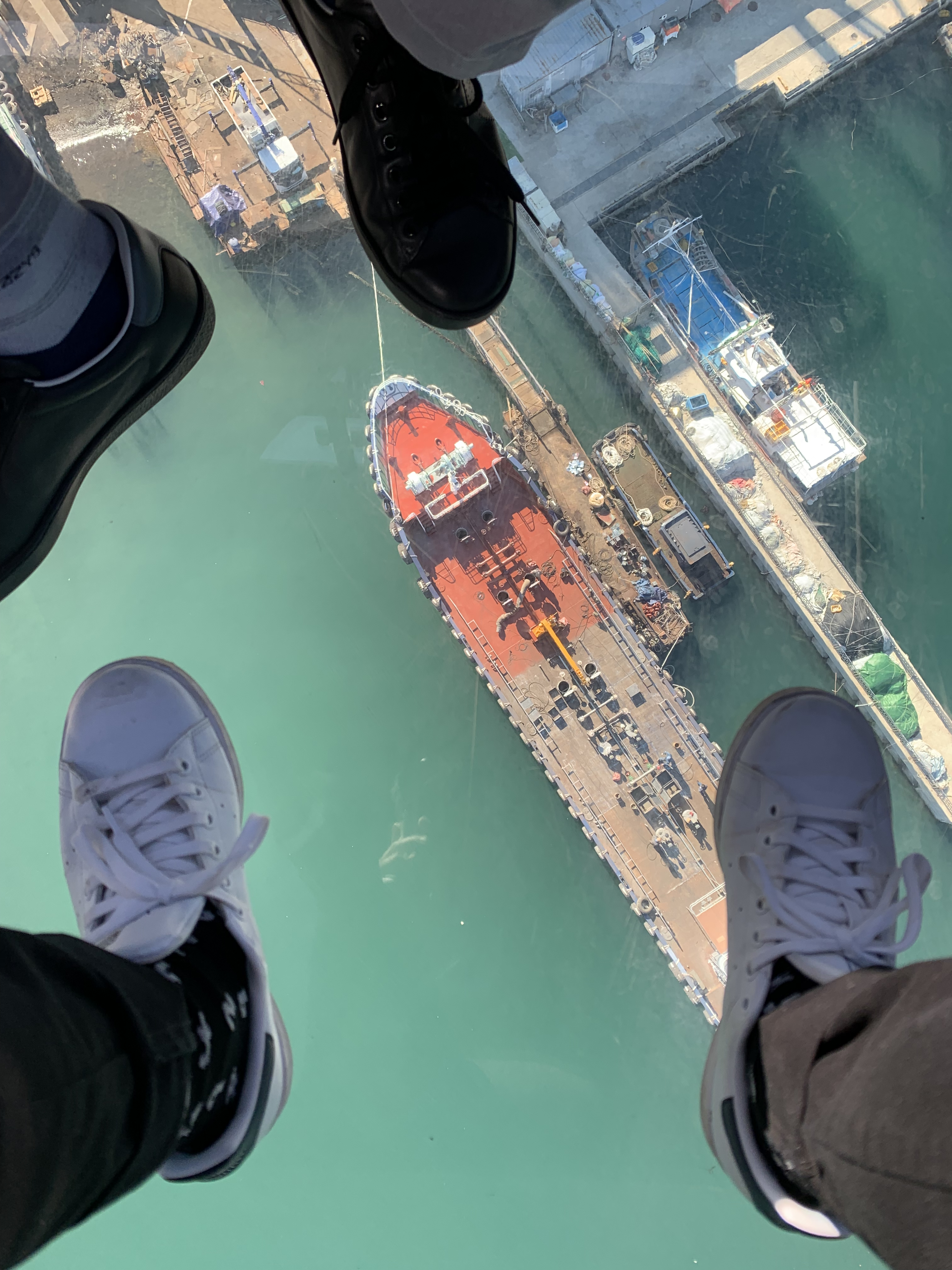
View through the floor of a crystal cable car (2022)
