= Dolsan Park =

Park in Yeosu, South Korea

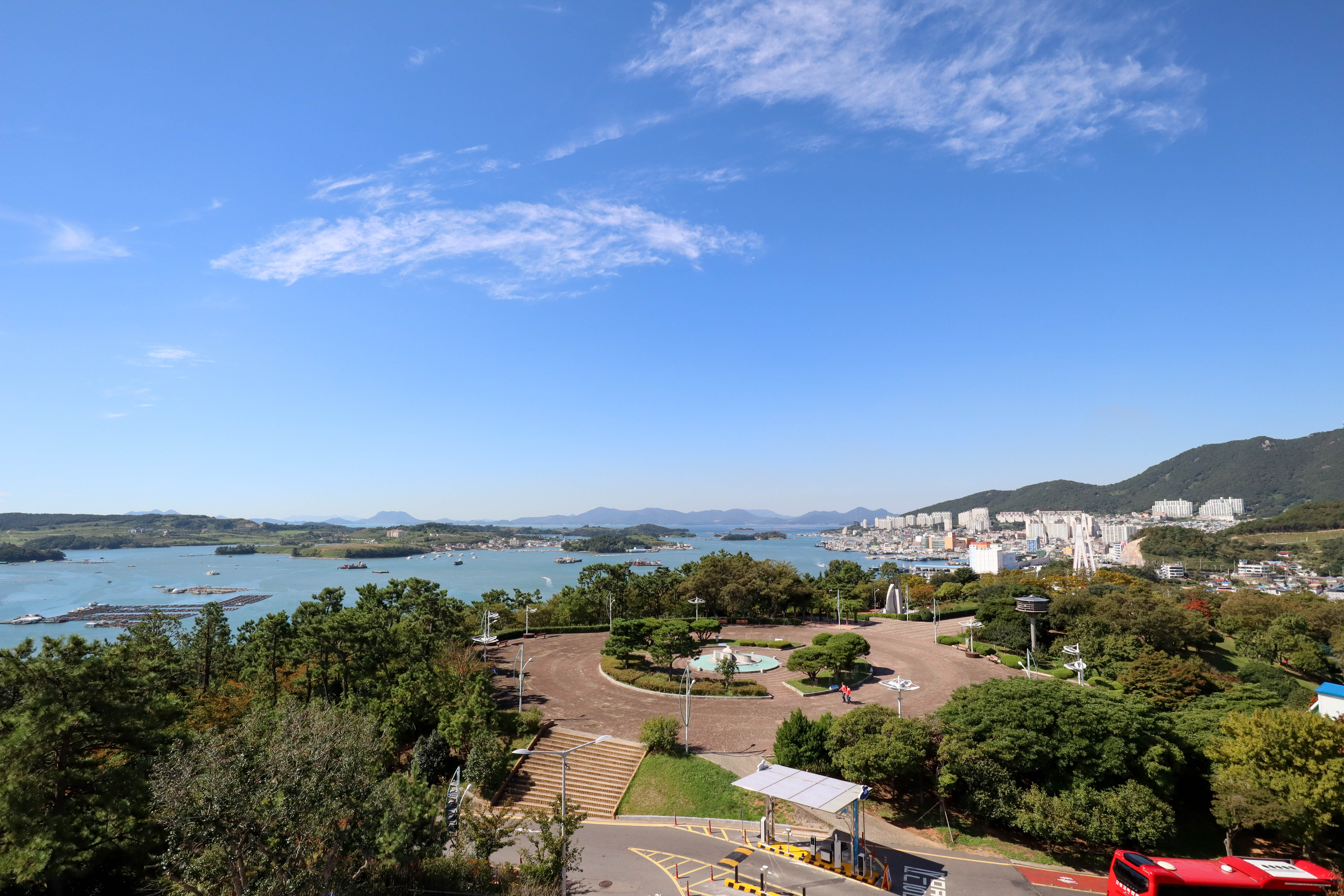
- Part of the park (2018)
- Interactive map of Dolsan Park
- Type: Public park
- Location: Yeosu, South Jeolla Province, South Korea
- Coordinates: 34°43′49″N 127°44′23″E
- Area: 28.7 hectares (71 acres)
- Established: 1987

Dolsan Park (Korean: 돌산공원; Hanja: 突山公園) is a park in Dolsan, Yeosu, South Jeolla Province, South Korea. The park is located on the island Dolsando. It was created in 1987, alongside the nearby Dolsan Bridge, and has an area of 0.287 square kilometers (0.111 mi^{2}).

One can ride the Yeosu Maritime Cable Car, which has a station in the park, to the mainland. The park has a cafe with a scenic view of Dolsan Bridge. A viewpoint in the park has views of Dolsan Bridge, Marine Park, and the island Janggundo. A time capsule was buried in the park in 1999, and will be opened in 2099.

There is a parking lot in the park with space for 150 cars.

== Gallery ==
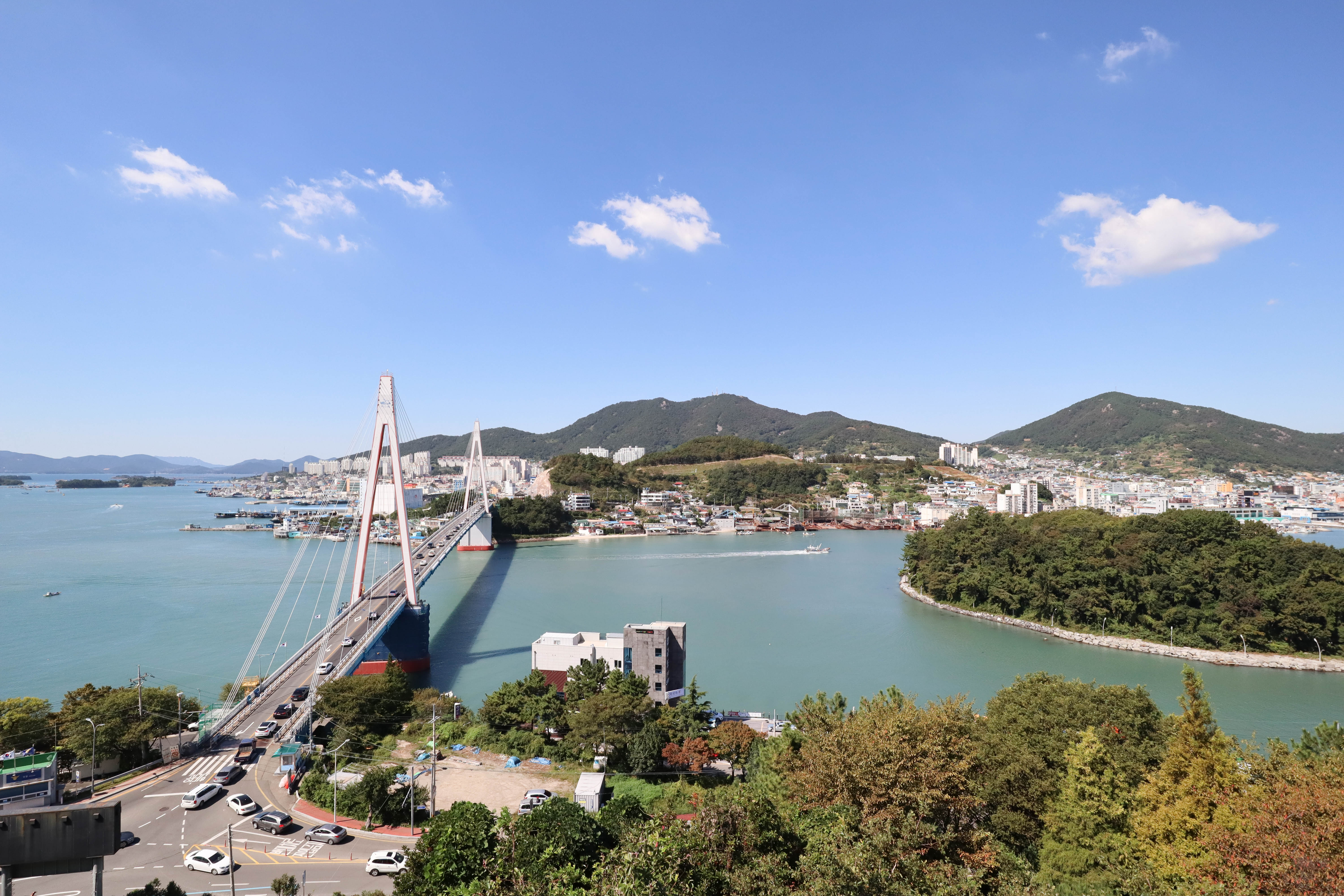
A view of Dolsan Bridge from the park (2018)

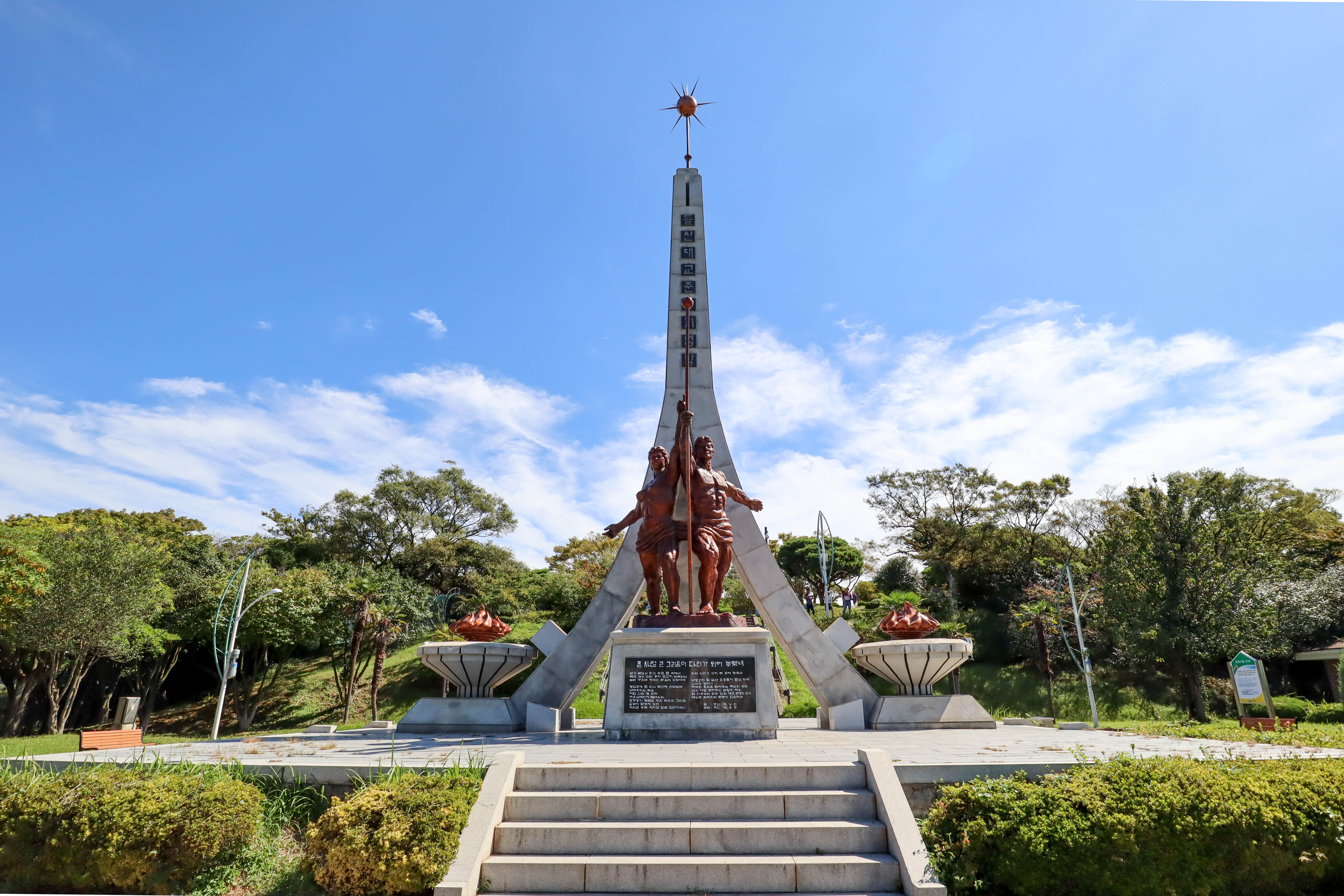
A monument to the construction of Dolsan Bridge in the park (2018)

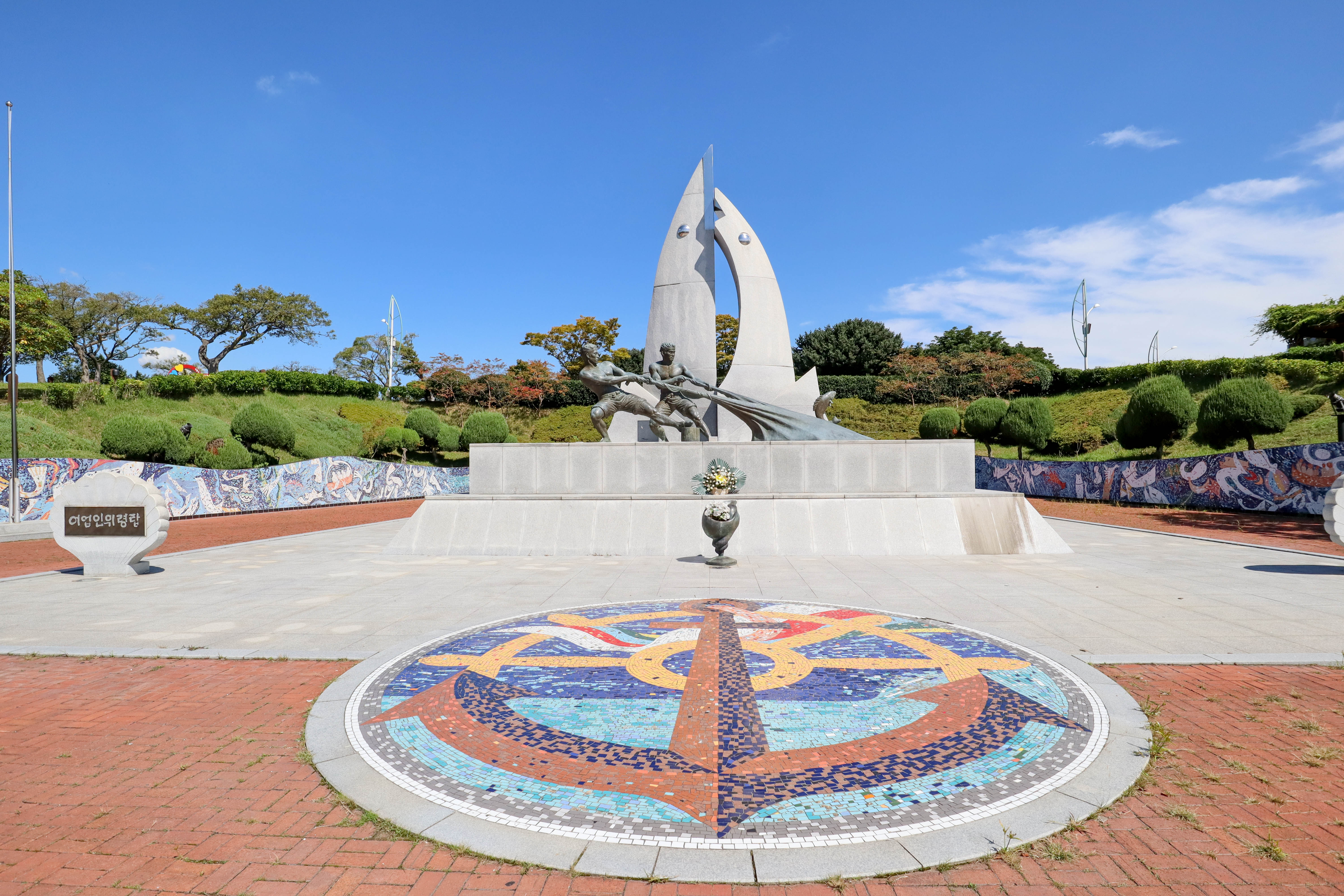
A monument to fishermen (2018)

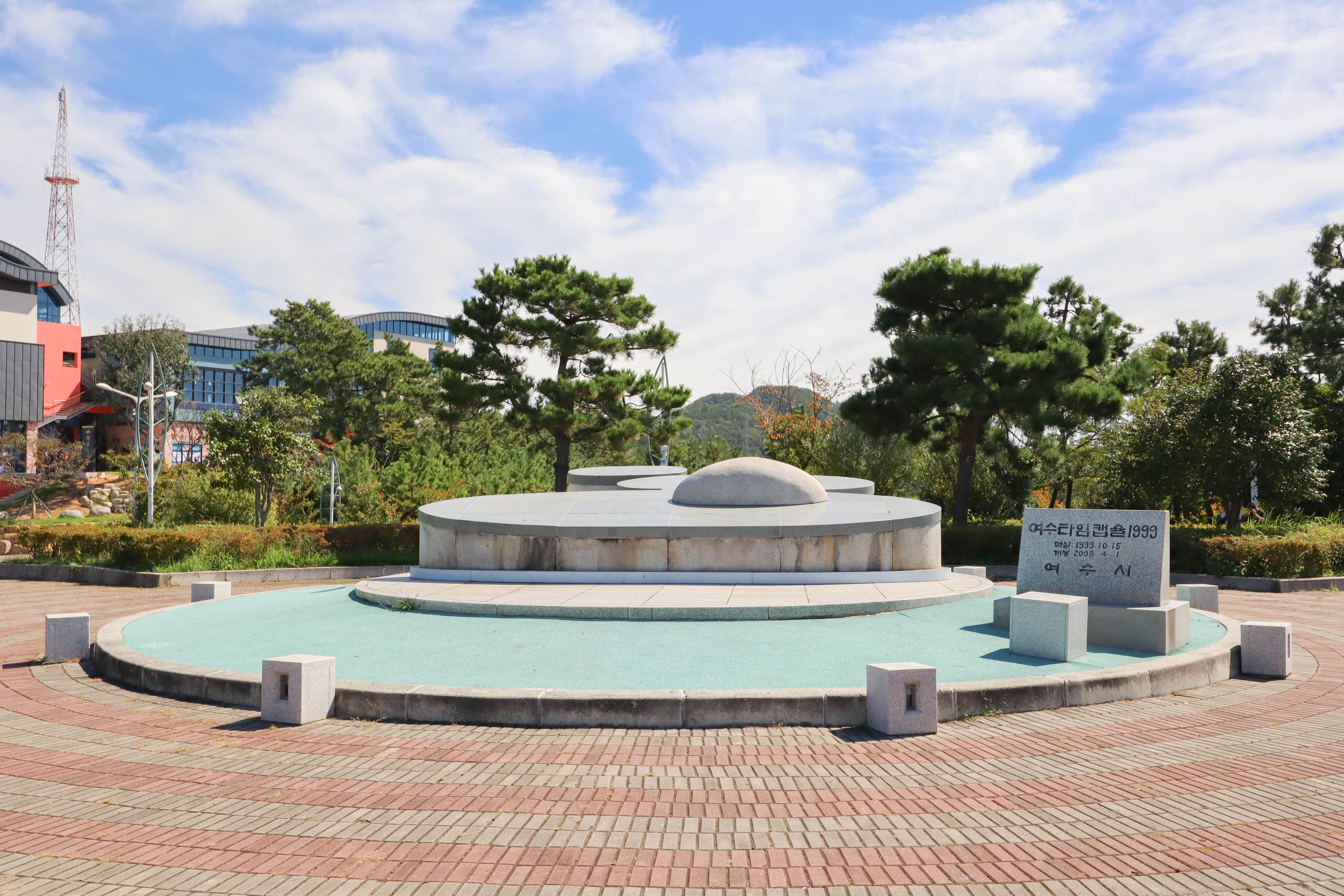
The time capsule, to be opened in 2099 (2018)

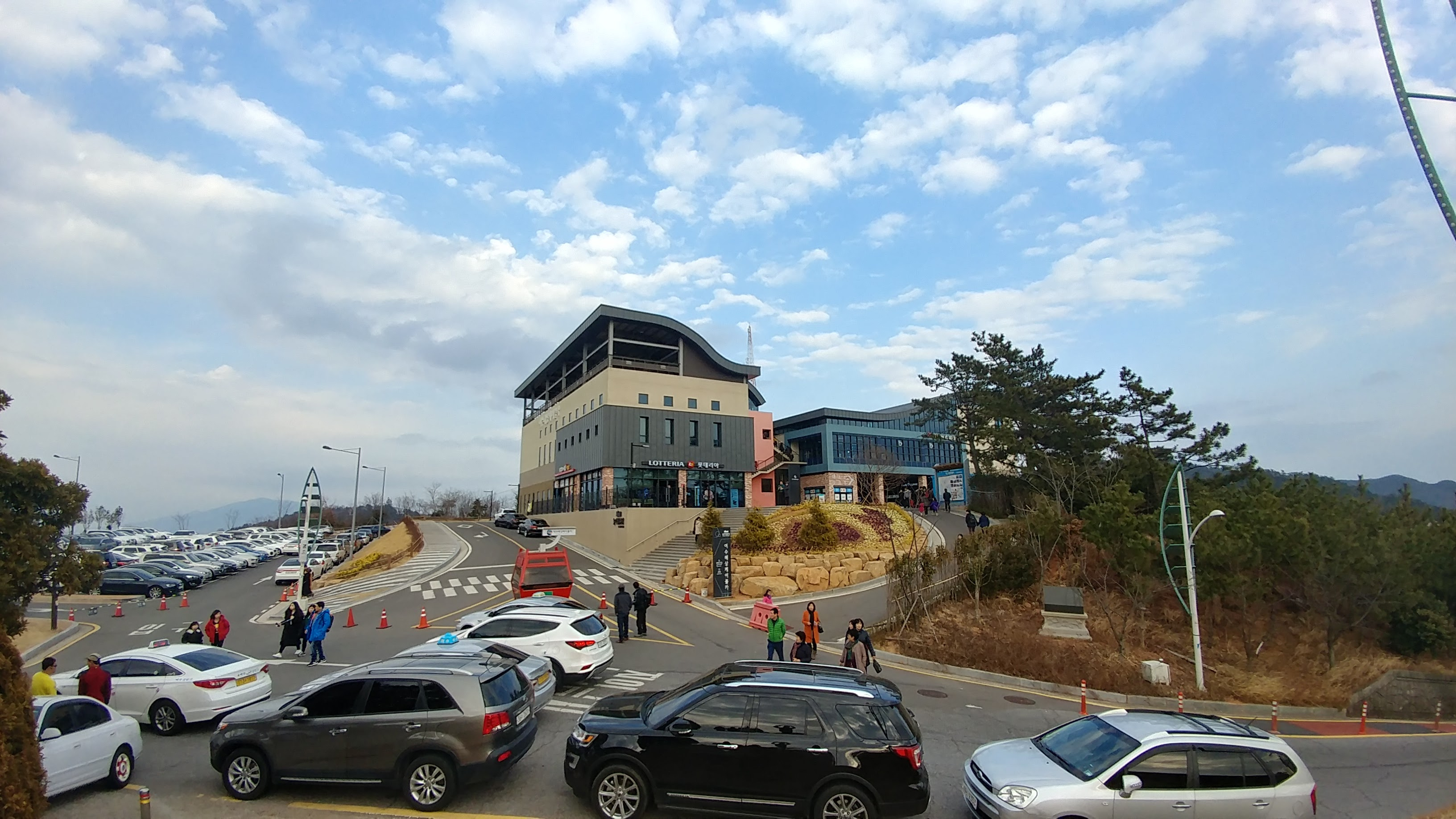
The cable car station and parking lot in the park (2017)

== See also ==
- Hallyeohaesang National Park – a national park in Yeosu
- Janggundo – small uninhabited island visible from the park
