= List of lighthouses in South Korea =

This is a list of lighthouses in South Korea.

== Lighthouses ==
| Name | Year built | Location & coordinates | Class of light | Focal height | NGA number | Admiralty number | Range nml |
|---|---|---|---|---|---|---|---|
| Ando Lighthouse | 2011 | Taean County; 36°57′30.4″N 126°10′07.0″E | Fl W 10s. | 43 metres (141 ft) | 17864 | M4156 | 21 |
| Baegyado Lighthouse | 2006 | Yeosu; 34°36′33.2″N 127°39′15.6″E | Fl W 20s. | 56 metres (184 ft) | 17216 | M4306 | 21 |
| Beopseong Lighthouse | n/a | Mokpo; 35°22′35.6″N 126°24′42.5″E | Fl W 4s. | 70 metres (230 ft) | 17720 | M4208 | 21 |
| Budo Lighthouse | 1904 | Ongjin County; 37°08′59.6″N 126°20′50.0″E | Fl W 15s. | 38 metres (125 ft) | 17932 | M4158 | 27 |
| Bulmugido Lighthouse | n/a | Haenam County; 34°45′32.7″N 126°13′25.5″E | Fl W 5s. | 32 metres (105 ft) | 17621 | M4216.9 | 15 |
| Changpomal Lighthouse | n/a | Yeongdeok County; 36°25′42.3″N 129°26′05.3″E | Fl W 6s. | 61 metres (200 ft) | 16596 | M4418 | 23 |
| Chilbaldo Lighthouse | 1905 | Sinan County; 34°47′17.8″N 125°47′17.0″E | Fl W 15s. | 105 metres (344 ft) | 17672 | M4212 | 18 |
| Chuksan Lighthouse | n/a | Yeongdeok County; 36°30′27.5″N 129°27′03.9″E | Fl W 5s. | 102 metres (335 ft) | 16584 | M4424 | 19 |
| Daedo Lighthouse | 2006 | Namhae County; 34°40′36.1″N 127°56′58.5″E | Fl W 10s. | 63 metres (207 ft) | 17100 | M4308.8 | 16 |
| Daehangdo Lighthouse | n/a | Heuksando; 34°39′12.3″N 125°28′42.0″E | Fl W 4s. | 51 metres (167 ft) | 17688 | M4225.5 | 16 |
| Daehwasado Lighthouse | 2006 | Boryeong; 36°14′55.0″N 126°16′57.6″E | Fl W 10s. | 101 metres (331 ft) | 17830 | M4189.8 | 17 |
| Daejin Lighthouse | 1991 | Gangwon Province; 38°30′13.3″N 128°25′43.1″E | Fl W 12s. | 61 metres (200 ft) | 16369 | M4459.9 | 20 |
| Daenorokdo Lighthouse | n/a | Sinan County; 35°06′10.8″N 125°59′16.3″E | Fl W 5s. | 72 metres (236 ft) | 17712 | M4210 | 18 |
| Dangjin Range Front Lighthouse | n/a | Dangjin; 37°03′43.5″N 126°30′27.7″E | Dir WRG | 32 metres (105 ft) | 17938 | M4162.62 | white: 21 red: 18 green: 18 |
| Dangsado Lighthouse | 2008 | Wando County; 34°05′53.6″N 126°36′09.1″E | Fl W 20s. | 107 metres (351 ft) | 17340 | M4282 | 23 |
| Dokdo Lighthouse | 1998 | Dokdo; 37°14′21.5″N 131°52′09.80″E | Fl W 10s. | 104 metres (341 ft) | 16548 | M4440 | 25 |
| Eocheongdo Lighthouse | 1912 | Gunsan; 36°07′30.5″N 125°58′04.2″E | Fl W 12s. | 61 metres (200 ft) | 17816 | M4188 | 26 |
| Eoryongdo Lighthouse | 1910 | Wando County; 34°17′12.2″N 126°28′25.2″E | Fl W 15s. | 93 metres (305 ft) | 17532 | M4278 | 21 |
| Gadeokdo Lighthouse | 2002 | Gangseo District, Busan; 34°59′22.3″N 128°49′44.7″E | Fl W 12s. | 104 metres (341 ft) | 16776 | M4352 | 21 |
| Gageodo Lighthouse | 1907 | Heuksando; 34°05′40.8″N 125°05′57.4″E | Fl W 15s. | 84 metres (276 ft) | 17708 | M4227 | 27 |
| Gampo Lighthouse | 2001 | Gyeongju; 35°48′25.1″N 129°30′40.8″E | Fl W 20s. | 34 metres (112 ft) | 16668 | M4400 | 26 |
| Ganryeong Mal Lighthouse | n/a | Ulleung County; 37°27′12.3″N 130°52′27.1″E | Fl W 5s. | 21 metres (69 ft) | 16544 | M4445 | 19 |
| Ganjeolgot Lighthouse | 2001 | Ulsan; 35°21′31.3″N 129°21′37.4″E | Fl W 15s. | 35 metres (115 ft) | 16712 | M4378 | 26 |
| Gasado Lighthouse | 2008 | Jodo-myeon; 34°27′38.1″N 126°02′34.3″E | Fl W 15s. | 76 metres (249 ft) | 17584 | M4232 | 27 |
| Geojin-ri Lighthouse | 2008 | Gangwon Province; 38°26′58.1″N 128°27′52.5″E | Al Fl WR 32s. | 90 metres (300 ft) | 16388 | M4459.5 | white: 25 red: 22 |
| Geomundo Lighthouse | 2006 | South Jeolla Province; 34°00′26.2″N 127°19′19.2″E | Fl W 15s. | 92 metres (302 ft) | 17244 | M4286 | 23 |
| Gyeongnyeolbido Lighthouse | 2011 | Taean County; 36°37′33.8″N 125°33′31.9″E | Fl W 10s. | 107 metres (351 ft) | 17844 | M4184 | 27 |
| Hajodo Lighthouse | 1909 | Jodo-myeon; 34°18′39.9″N 126°05′16.4″E | Fl W 10s. | 48 metres (157 ft) | 17556 | M4246 | 26 |
| Hajukdo Lighthouse | n/a | Heuksando; 34°45′50.8″N 125°26′27.6″E | Fl W 5s. | 100 metres (330 ft) | 17676 | M4225 | 18 |
| Hataedo Lighthouse | n/a | Heuksando; 34°23′42.1″N 125°17′58.2″E | Fl W 6s. | 32 metres (105 ft) | 17700 | M4226 | 21 |
| Hojangdo Lighthouse | n/a | Heuksando; 34°42′56.8″N 125°24′29.9″E | Fl W 10s. | 78 metres (256 ft) | 17678 | M4222.5 | 18 |
| Homigot Lighthouse | 1903 | Homigot; 36°04′38.43″N 129°34′09.12″E | Fl W 12s. | 31 metres (102 ft) | 16652 | M4406 | 27 |
| Hongdo Lighthouse | 1931 | Heuksando; 34°42′40.6″N 125°12′14.0″E | Fl (3) W 20s. | 89 metres (292 ft) | 17696 | M4222 | 24 |
| Hongdo (Gyeongsang) Lighthouse | 1906 | Korea Strait; 34°32′12.1″N 128°43′58.8″E | Fl W 10s. | 117 metres (384 ft) | 16864 | M4334 | 25 |
| Hupo Lighthouse | 1968 | Uljin County; 36°40′50.0″N 129°27′43.4″E | Fl W 10s. | 64 metres (210 ft) | 16572 | M4426 | 26 |
| Hwaamchu Lighthouse | 1994 | Nam District, Ulsan; 35°28′21.0″N 129°24′26.7″E | Al Fl WR 20s. | 49 metres (161 ft) | 16688 | M4385 | white: 26 red: 21 |
| Hwamomal Lighthouse | n/a | Uljin County; 36°46′02.6″N 129°28′36.7″E | Fl W 7s. | 48 metres (157 ft) | 16568 | M4431 | 19 |
| Hwangdeokdo Lighthouse | 2006 | Geoje; 35°00′40.2″N 128°37′14.8″E | Fl W 6s. | 91 metres (299 ft) | 16828 | M4341 | 15 |
| Hwangjedo Lighthouse | n/a | Wando County; 34°11′37.0″N 127°04′44.2″E | Fl W 5s. | 52 metres (171 ft) | 17290 | M4295.7 | 18 |
| Hyongnangap Lighthouse | 2006 | Ulleung County; 37°29′13.4″N 130°55′09.3″E | Fl W 14s. | 116 metres (381 ft) | 16520 | M4446.2 | 26 |
| Imweon Hang Lighthouse | n/a | Samcheok; 37°14′06.2″N 129°21′18.9″E | Fl W 8s. | 60 metres (200 ft) | 16508 | M4433.7 | 22 |
| Incheon Lock Gate South Lighthouse | n/a | Incheon; 37°27′55.1″N 126°35′37.6″E | Fl R 5s. | 16 metres (52 ft) | 17968.5 | M4173.6 | 18 |
| Jeongdongjin Dan Lighthouse | n/a | Gangneung; 37°40′24.0″N 129°03′25.6″E | Fl W 8s. | 89 metres (292 ft) | 16452 | M4449.5 | 22 |
| Jeonggokdu Lighthouse | n/a | Taean County; 36°53′05.3″N 126°10′39.9″E | Fl W 6s. | 24 metres (79 ft) | 17868 | M4156.3 | 15 |
| Jeojin Dan Range Front Lighthouse | 1991 | Gangwon Province; 38°33′09.5″N 128°24′30.0″E | F W | 62 metres (203 ft) | 16365 | M4460 | 24 |
| Jeojin Dan Range Rear Lighthouse | 1991 | Gangwon Province; 38°33′09.5″N 128°23′47.0″E | F W | 62 metres (203 ft) | 16365.1 | M4460.1 | 24 |
| Jinmimal Lighthouse | n/a | Uljin County; 36°53′39.2″N 129°25′03.9″E | Fl W 6s. | 58 metres (190 ft) | 16564 | M4431.5 | 19 |
| Jinseomal Lighthouse | n/a | Sinan County; 34°52′28.0″N 125°58′03.6″E | Fl W 5s. | 60 metres (200 ft) | 17666 | M4211.5 | 18 |
| Jukbyeon Lighthouse | 1910 | Uljin County; 37°03′29.3″N 129°25′46.0″E | Fl W 20s. | 49 metres (161 ft) | 16552 | M4432 | 20 |
| Jukdo Lighthouse | 1907 | Maenggoldo; 34°13′28.3″N 125°50′51.6″E | Fl W 10s. | 85 metres (279 ft) | 17576 | M4248 | 26 |
| Jumunjin Lighthouse | 2008 | Gangneung; 37°53′51.4″N 128°50′02.2″E | Fl W 15s. | 40 metres (130 ft) | 16436 | M4450 | 20 |
| Makgaedo Lighthouse | n/a | Masan; 35°08′15.5″N 128°36′00.0″E | Fl W 6s. | 25 metres (82 ft) | 16816 | M4348 | 15 |
| Maldo Lighthouse | 2007 | Gunsan; 35°51′29.2″N 126°18′54.5″E | Fl W 10s. | 60 metres (200 ft) | 17748 | M4206 | 26 |
| Manjaedo Lighthouse | n/a | Heuksando; 34°12′48.1″N 125°28′14.8″E | Fl W 5s. | 195 metres (640 ft) | 17704 | M4228 | 16 |
| Marado Lighthouse | 1987 | Marado; 33°07′00.0″N 126°16′10.1″E | Fl W 10s. | 51 metres (167 ft) | 17480 | M4254 | 26 |
| Mokdeokdo Lighthouse | 1910 | Taean County; 36°55′43.2″N 125°47′12.8″E | Fl W 20s. | 66 metres (217 ft) | 17856 | M4152 | 28 |
| Mokpogu Lighthouse | 2003 | Haenam County; 34°45′44.2″N 126°17′50.4″E | Fl W 5s. | 37 metres (121 ft) | 17624 | M4217 | 20 |
| Mukho Lighthouse | 2008 | Donghae City; 37°33′16.2″N 129°07′06.9″E | Fl W 10s. | 91 metres (299 ft) | 16464 | M4447 | 26 |
| Mulseongmal Lighthouse | n/a | Heuksando; 34°03′07.9″N 125°08′36.0″E | Fl W 10s. | 156 metres (512 ft) | 17710 | M4227.4 | 18 |
| Nasa Lighthouse | n/a | Ulju County; 35°21′07.0″N 129°20′42.0″E | Fl W 6s. | 18 metres (59 ft) | 16713 | M4377.9 | 19 |
| Odongdo Lighthouse | 2002 | Yeosu; 34°44′39.7″N 127°46′03.7″E | Fl W 10s. | 61 metres (200 ft) | 17116 | M4310 | 25 |
| Oebyeongdo Lighthouse | 1907 | Jindo Island; 34°22′43.5″N 125°56′21.2″E | Fl W 10s. | 81 metres (266 ft) | 17554 | M4247.7 | 18 |
| Oho Ri Lighthouse | n/a | Gangwon Province; 38°19′38.9″N 128°31′46.6″E | Fl W 5s. | 27 metres (89 ft) | 16378 | M4459.3 | 21 |
| Okpo Hang South Breakwater Lighthouse | n/a | Okpo-dong; 34°53′41.3″N 128°43′10.2″E | Fl G 7s. | 15 metres (49 ft) | 16840 | M4240.5 | 18 |
| Ongdo Lighthouse | 2009 | Taean County; 36°38′50.3″N 126°00′31.4″E | Fl W 15s. | 100 metres (330 ft) | 17840 | M4154 | 26 |
| Oryukdo Lighthouse | 1999 | Busan; 35°05′29.1″N 129°07′36.6″E | Fl W 10s. | 53 metres (174 ft) | 16732 | M4374 | 22 |
| Palmido Lighthouse | 2003 | Incheon; 37°21′30.8″N 126°30′38.0″E | Fl W 10s. | 85 metres (279 ft) | 17960 | M4167 | 27 |
| Pohang Old Port East Breakwater Lighthouse | n/a | Pohang; 36°02′45.7″N 129°23′05.1″E | Fl R 5s. | 15 metres (49 ft) | 16620 | M4413.2 | 15 |
| Pohang Shinhang Lighthouse | n/a | Pohang; 36°01′21.0″N 129°24′01.4″E | Dir WRG | 72 metres (236 ft) | 16624 | M4412 | white: 18 red: 15 green: 14 |
| Samcheok Hang Lighthouse | n/a | Samcheok; 37°26′15.3″N 129°11′24.2″E | Dir WRG | 32 metres (105 ft) | 16487 | M4437.2 | white: 21 red: 17 green: 17 |
| Sangchujado Lighthouse | 2006 | Chuja Islands; 33°57′17.9″N 126°17′47.3″E | Fl W 20s. | 146 metres (479 ft) | 17356 | M4277.5 | 26 |
| Sanji Lighthouse | 1999 | Jejudo; 33°31′17.5″N 126°32′44.3″E | Fl W 15s. | 72 metres (236 ft) | 17376 | M4266 | 26 |
| Sangwangdungdo Lighthouse | n/a | Buan County; 35°39′42.0″N 126°06′24.0″E | Fl W 5s. | 174 metres (571 ft) | 17744 | M4206.6 | 20 |
| Saramal Lighthouse | n/a | Homigot; 35°59′27.4″N 129°34′02.7″E | Fl W 9s. | 18 metres (59 ft) | 16656 | M4404 | 19 |
| Seogwipo Oehang East Breakwater Lighthouse | n/a | Seogwipo; 33°13′58.4″N 126°34′02.7″E | Fl R 4s. | 17 metres (56 ft) | 17467 | M4274.505 | 16 |
| Seoimal Lighthouse | 2006 | Geojedo; 34°47′15.8″N 128°44′17.2″E | Fl W 20s. | 120 metres (390 ft) | 16860 | M4336 | 27 |
| Sihado Lighthouse | 1907 | Haenam County; 34°41′59.9″N 126°14′27.9″E | Fl W 12s. | 39 metres (128 ft) | 17616 | M4220 | 22 |
| Sokcho Lighthouse | 2006 | Sokcho; 38°12′49.3″N 128°36′00.6″E | Fl (4) W 45s. | 66 metres (217 ft) | 16404 | M4458 | 19 |
| Somaemuldo Lighthouse | 1917 est. | South Gyeongsang Province; 34°37′11.2″N 128°32′54.0″E | Fl W 13s. | 91 metres (299 ft) | 16872 | M4332 | 26 |
| Sorido Lighthouse | 1910 | Yeosu; 34°24′42.0″N 127°48′02.4″E | Fl W12s. | 82 metres (269 ft) | 17064 | M4308 | 26 |
| Udo Lighthouse | 2003 | Jejudo; 33°29′33.9″N 126°57′56.7″E | Fl W 20s. | 140 metres (460 ft) | 17420 | M4272 | 27 |
| Ulgi Lighthouse | 1994 | Ulsan; 35°29′34.03″N 129°26′34.86″E | Fl W 10s. | 53 metres (174 ft) | 16680 | M4394 | 26 |
| Ulsan Sin Hang East Breakwater North Head Lighthouse | 2010 | Ulsan; 35°26′42.3″N 129°22′51.5″E | Fl G 4s. | 30 metres (98 ft) | 16711.6 | M4381.14 | 19 |
| Weolpo Lighthouse | n/a | Pohang; 36°10′59.9″N 129°23′30.4″E | Fl W 7s. | 24 metres (79 ft) | 16612 | M4413.6 | 19 |
| Yangjiam Chwi Lighthouse | 2008 | Okpo-dong; 34°53′42.4″N 128°45′05.8″E | Fl W 6s. | 60 metres (200 ft) | 16848 | M4340.3 | 19 |
| Yangpo Lighthouse | n/a | Gyeongju; 35°52′14.4″N 129°32′02.9″E | Fl W 7s. | 24 metres (79 ft) | 16664 | M4402 | 19 |
| Yeonamgap Lighthouse | n/a | Pohang; 36°04′34.2″N 129°25′09.8″E | Fl W 5s. | 33 metres (108 ft) | 16616 | M4410.5 | 20 |
| Yeongdo Lighthouse | 2004 | Yeongdo District; 35°03′08.6″N 129°05′31.3″E | Fl (3) W 18s. | 87 metres (285 ft) | 16728 | M4356 | 24 |
| Yeoseodo Lighthouse | n/a | Wando County; 33°59′18.0″N 126°55′06.0″E | Fl W 10s. | 89 metres (292 ft) | 17316 | M4284 | 18 |
| Yogjido Lighthouse | 1961 | Tongyeong; 34°36′51.5″N 128°14′28.4″E | Fl W 6s. | 194 metres (636 ft) | 16960 | M4322.4 | 19 |
| Yulpo Mal Lighthouse | n/a | South Gyeongsang Province; 34°53′18.0″N 128°08′00.0″E | Fl W 6s. | 32 metres (105 ft) | 16964 | M4321 | 20 |

== See also ==
- Lists of lighthouses and lightvessels
