= Homigot =

Point of land in South Korea

Coordinates: 36.0764°N 129.5686°E

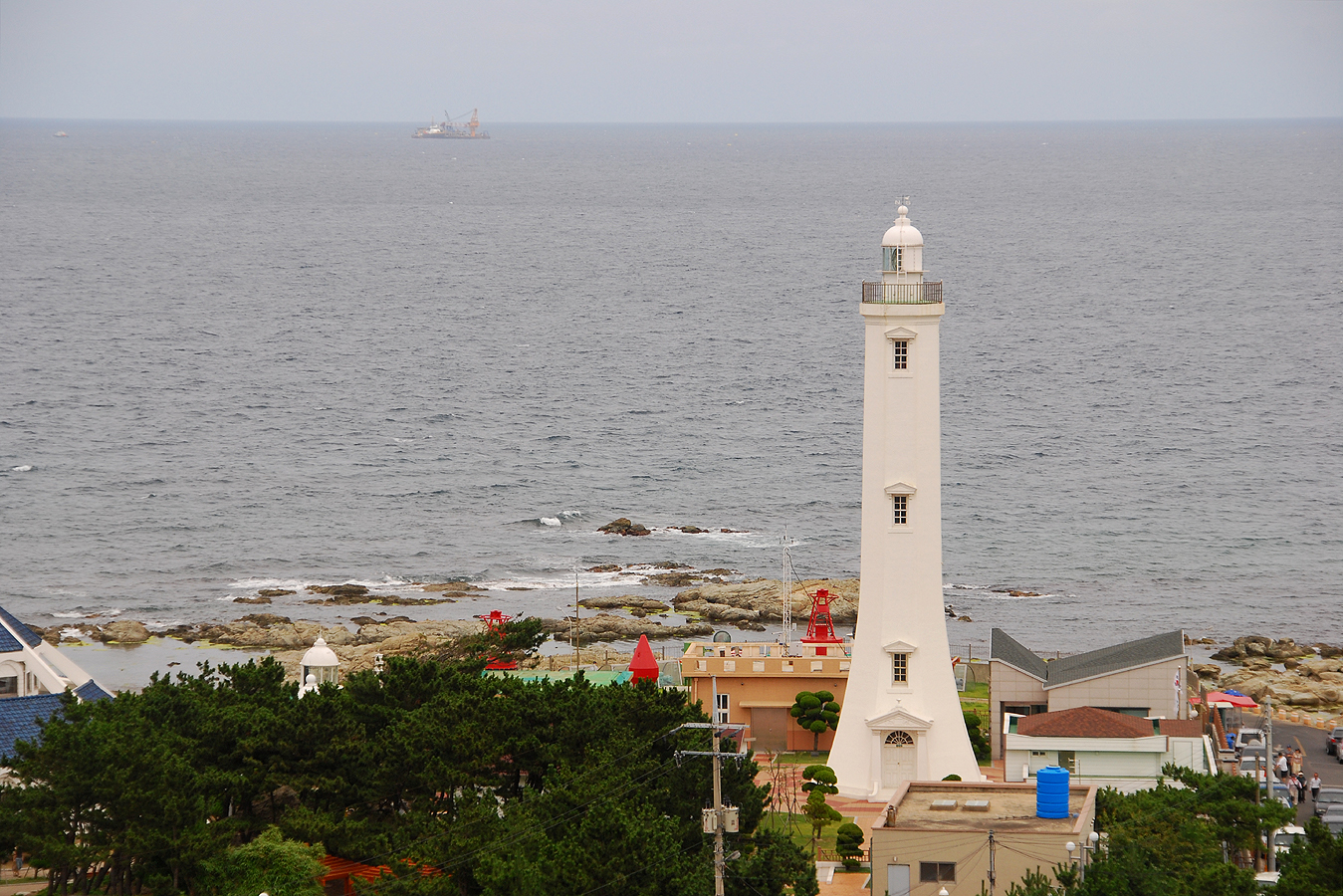
Homigot Lighthouse

Homigot (Korean: 호미곶, lit. "tiger's tail cape") is a point of land in North Gyeongsang Province, South Korea jutting out into the Sea of Japan. Homigot is located to the east of urban Pohang in Daebo-myeon. The area is home to the Homigot Lighthouse, the tallest lighthouse in South Korea.

== Etymology ==
Homigot means "tiger's tail cape." The shape of the Korean Peninsula is often compared to a tiger. Homigot is located on a cape equivalent to the tail of a tiger, so it was designated Homigot.

== Geography ==
Homigot is one of the easternmost points on the Korean peninsula and as such serves every year as a gathering place for thousands to greet Korea's first sunrise of the New Year. The beach is also home to the Hands of Harmony sculpture. The shore of Homigot, which is the tip of Pohang's Yeongil Bay, is a place where the cold currents and warm currents intersect. Accordingly, fixed shore net fishing is active and there are plenty of fish resources such as squid and mackerel pike. Also, the sea breeze is so strong that it is the first test run in North Gyeongsang Province to build a wind generator in 2001.

Homigot is a gentle hill mountainous terrain that protrudes three sides into the sea except for the southern part, which is densely populated with five to six peaks at altitudes between 120 and 180 meters above sea level. Pohang Airport, the existing road network linking national roads and provincial roads, as well as nearby port of Guryongpo and Daebo is secured, making it easy to construct wind farms without additional infrastructure investment.

== Natural Environment ==
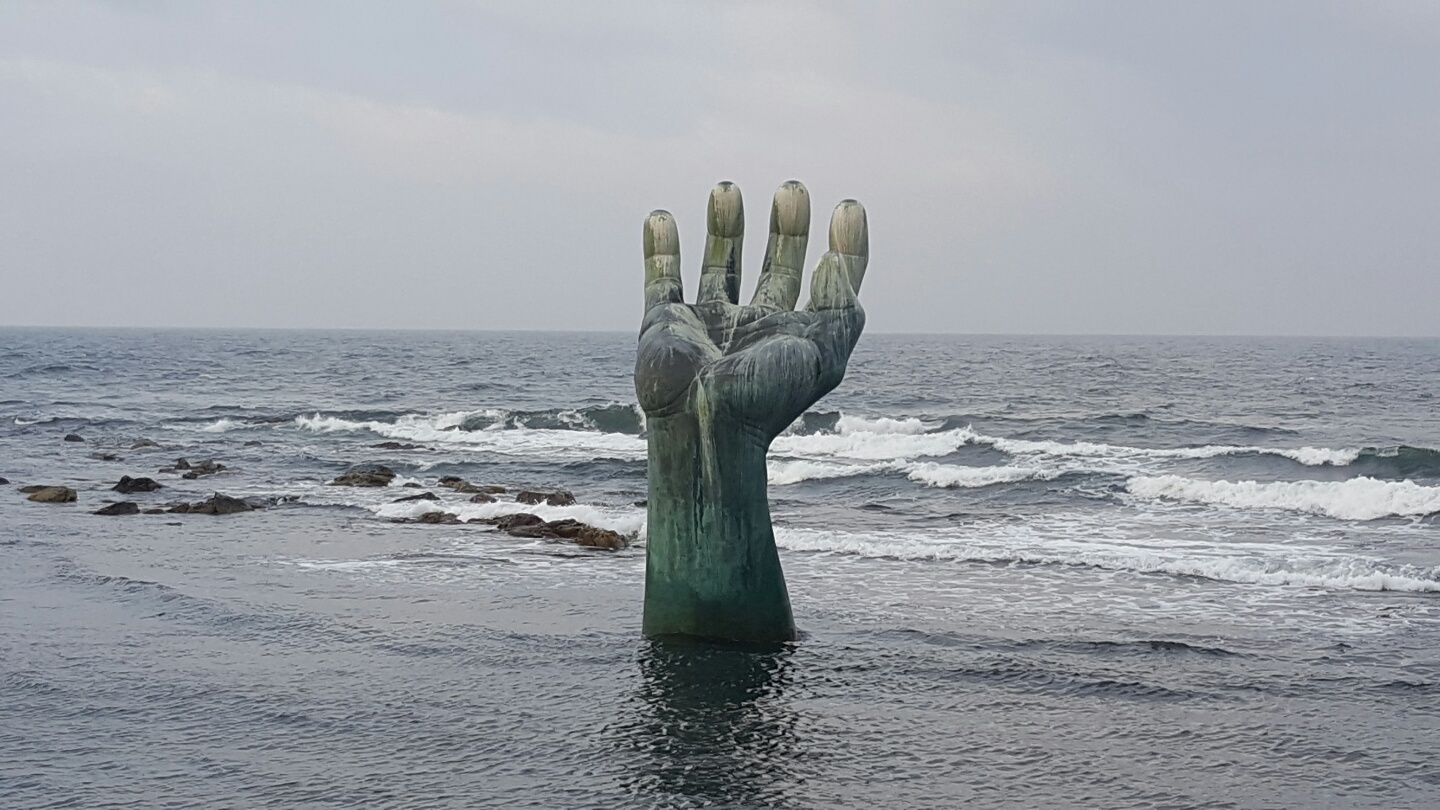
"The Hand of Coexistence", a seaside sculpture

An analysis of ground weather from 1993 to 2001 at the automatic weather station at Homigot's northern tip showed a distinct difference between summer and winter of wind speed. Starting in October, the wind speed slowly increased, reaching its peak in December and January, and gradually decreasing until July. The average wind speed of more than 5 m/s was measured from December to March, but the average wind speed was below 4 m/s from May to August. In other words, wind speeds tend to remain strong at night in winter and fall during daytime. On the other hand, the wind speed increases in the spring and summer between 3-4 p.m., and the wind speed is maintained almost constant in autumn. Therefore, it is considered that the energy generated by wind power will be concentrated in the winter night time.

== History ==
=== Joseon dynasty ===
During the Myeongjong of Joseon dynasty in the 16th century, Homigot was explained in 'A secret view of the mountains and water(山水秘境)'by feng shui geomanologist Namsago. In the book, he explained that Homigot corresponds to the tiger's tail. Gim Jeong-ho made Daedongyeojido and measured Homigot seven times to confirm that it is the most eastern part of the country. It is also called Janggigot(長鬐串) and Dongeulbaegot(冬乙背串). Yukdang Choi Nam-sun chose the sunrise of Homigot as one of the 10 best points to the Joseon dynasty.

=== A tale of Yeon Oh-rang and Se O-nyeo ===
There is a tale about Yeon Oh-rang Se O-nyeo in Homigot. The name of the main character, Yeon Oh-rang, is believed to have been derived from Youngil bay. In the story of Yeon Oh-rang and Se Oh-nyeo of Samguk yusa, the couple moved to Japan to become kings, and Silla, which had lost the sun and moon, gave the silk that Se O-nyeo had woven. Many theories are being expressed regarding the interpretation of the story, as a member of the Talhae of Silla family is being pushed back to the Japanese government by the family of Hyeokgeose of Silla.

=== Tourism in North Gyeongsang Province ===
The sunrise history travel zone is a wide area theme tour centered on the sunrise spot in Korea and Silla culture. The project includes Homigot of Pohang. The project aims to improve the sunrise point environment at Homigot.

== Traffic ==
Homigot, which is located along Yeongil Bay, is frequently shipped by large ships carrying steel materials, products from POSCO. and other miscellaneous goods. Also, fishing boats are active. In particular, the seas near Homigot are areas where ships of ports are frequently traversed and traveled.

== Festival ==
=== The Sunrise Festival ===
The sunrise festival at Homigot is held every year on January 1. The sunrise festival has variety of programs. Busking and radio DJ zone are available for citizen participation. Also, there are experiences of decorating Korean paper (Hanji), making a kite for lucky. The most famous is the New Year's Tteokguk (rice cake soup) eating event. When the New Year comes, rice cake soup for 10,000 people is boiled and shared in a large Gamasot. Gamasot is displayed at Homigot.

=== The Octopus Festival ===
The Octopus Festival is held every year on April. It has variety programs. The main theme is catching octopus with bare hand and octopus auction.

=== The camping festival ===
The festival was held to promote the city's attractions and entertainment by using camping, which is the center of the recent trend of healing culture. According to Pohang City government the festival is designed to promote regional economic boom, see and enjoy the event ahead of the regular season. Those who participated in the festival were able to experience camping cook contest, watching the Russia World Cup game and water gun play etc. About 2,000 tourists participated in the festival.

== Lighthouse ==
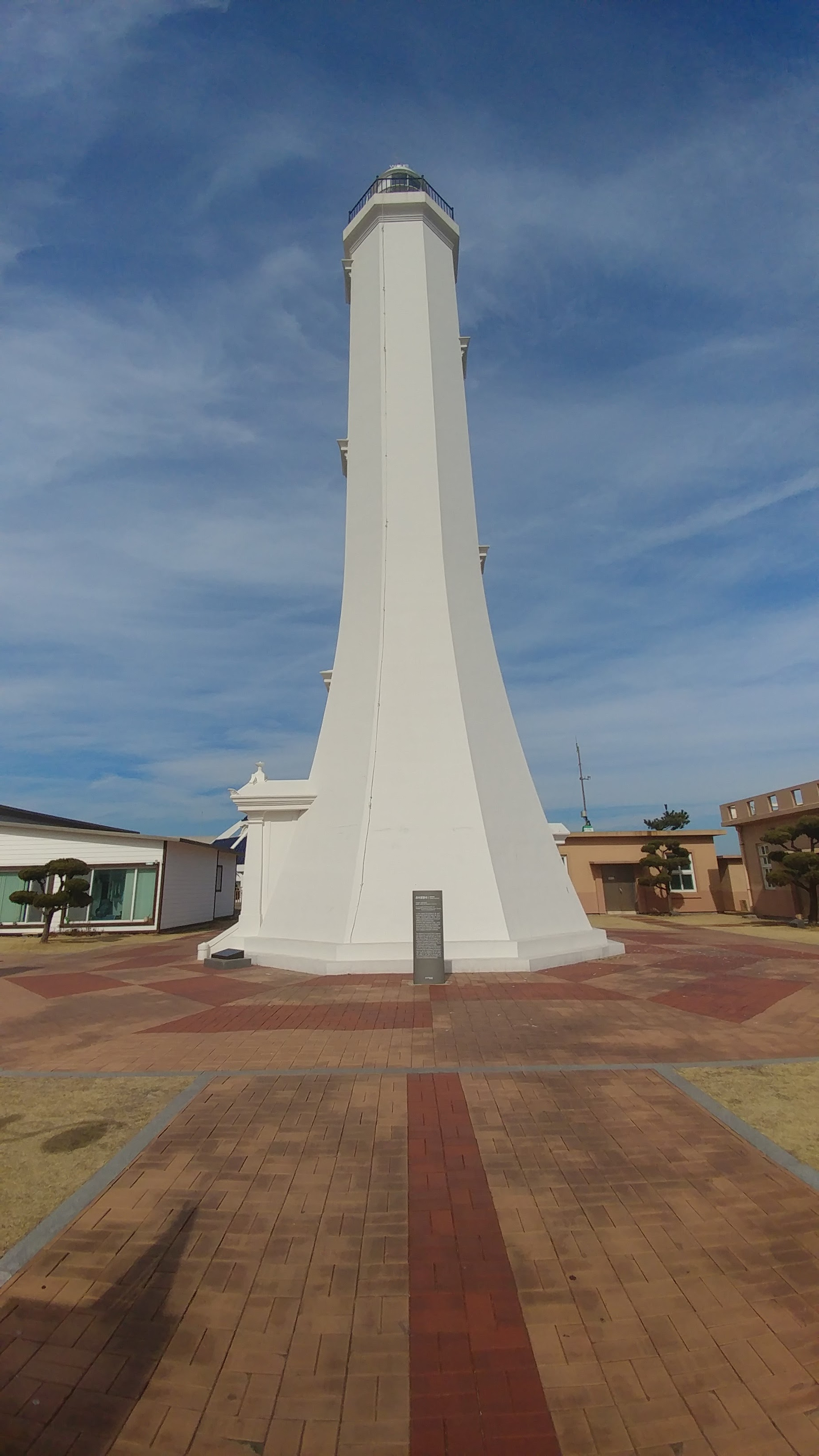
Homigot Lighthouse

The Homigot Lighthouse (호미곶등대) is an active lighthouse in Pohang, South Korea. With a height of 26.4 metres (87 ft), it is the tallest in South Korea. The lighthouse was built in 1900s, made with only bricks not using rebar. It is shaped like an occipital shape and to ensure the stability of the lower part, the lower part was held wider and narrower as it gradually rose.

== National Lighthouse Museum ==
Korea National Lighthouse Museum is placed in Homigot, right beside Homigot Lighthouse. There is information about all the Lighthouse in Korea.

There is 5 themes in the museum.

- Information retrieval section : Introduction of the relics & exhibition informations using the info-search
- Aids to Navigation History Hall : Introduction of history of aids to navigation in Korea and the world
- Aids to Navigation Relics Hall : Display of visual, sound, radio aids to navigation
- Lighthouse Keepers Hall : Display of the miniature and relics showing the past and present life of lighthouse keepers
- Lighthouse Archive Hall : Various documents related with the history of lighthouse

== Hand of Coexistence ==
'Hand of Coexistence' was made by a professor Seung-guk Kim at Yeongnam University with the support of Pohang Construction and Daegu Bank. In commemoration of the new millennium, 'Hand of Coexistence' is a two-handed sculpture set up at Homigot in Pohang in December 1999. The right hand, 8.5 meters high in the sea, and 5.5 meters high in the sunrise plaza.

== Gallery ==
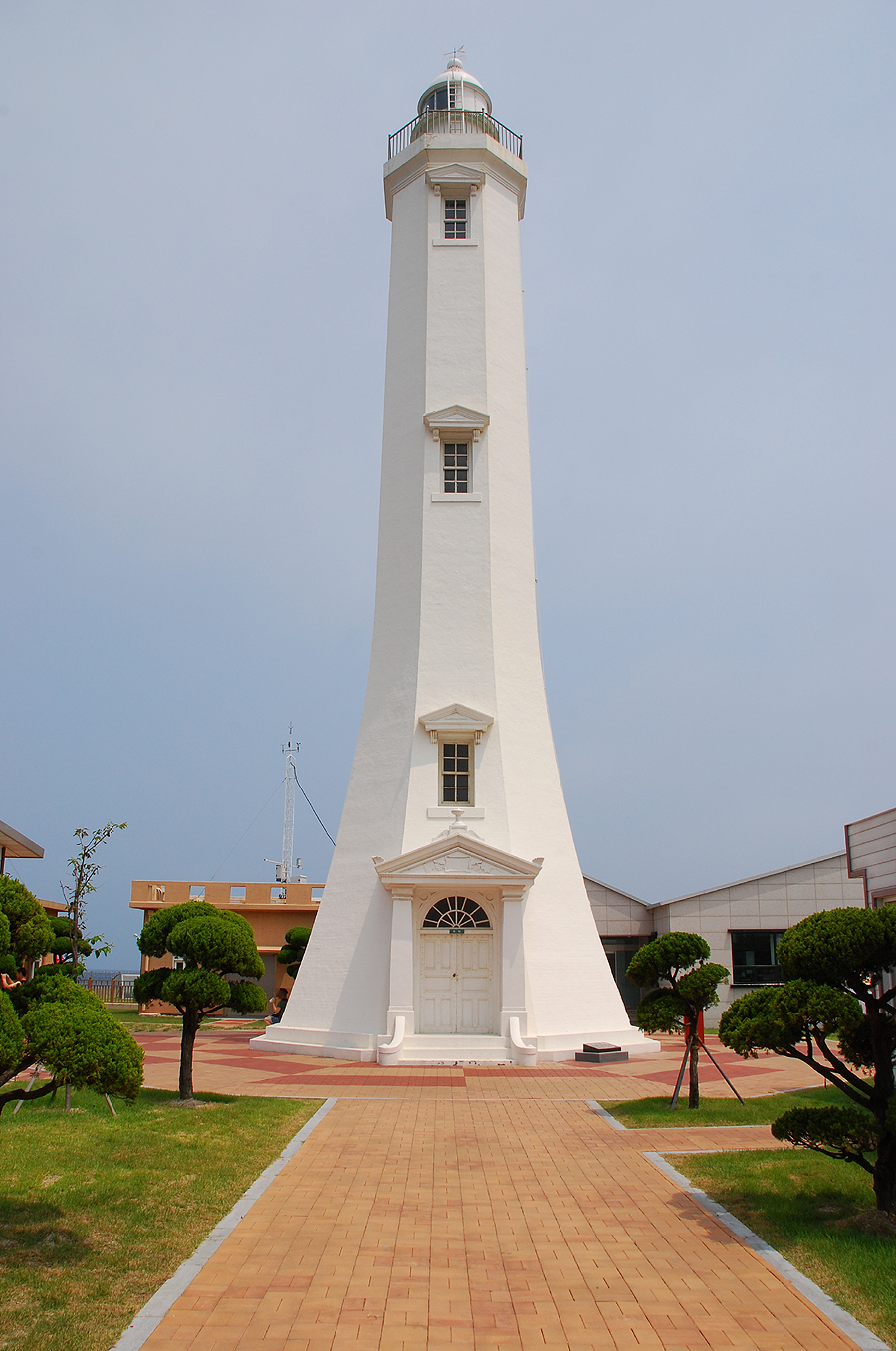
Homigot Lighthouse

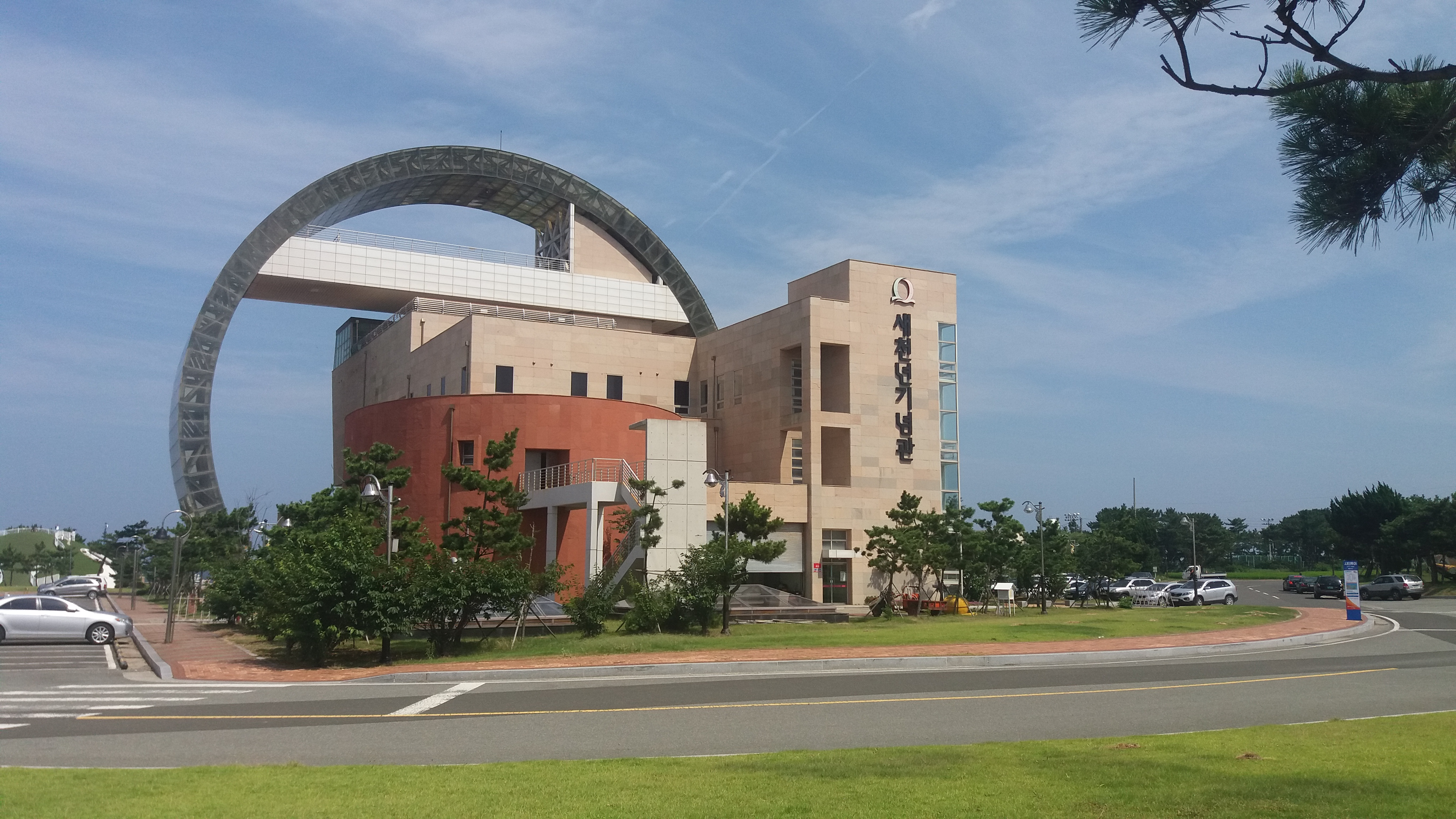
New Millennium Memorial Hall

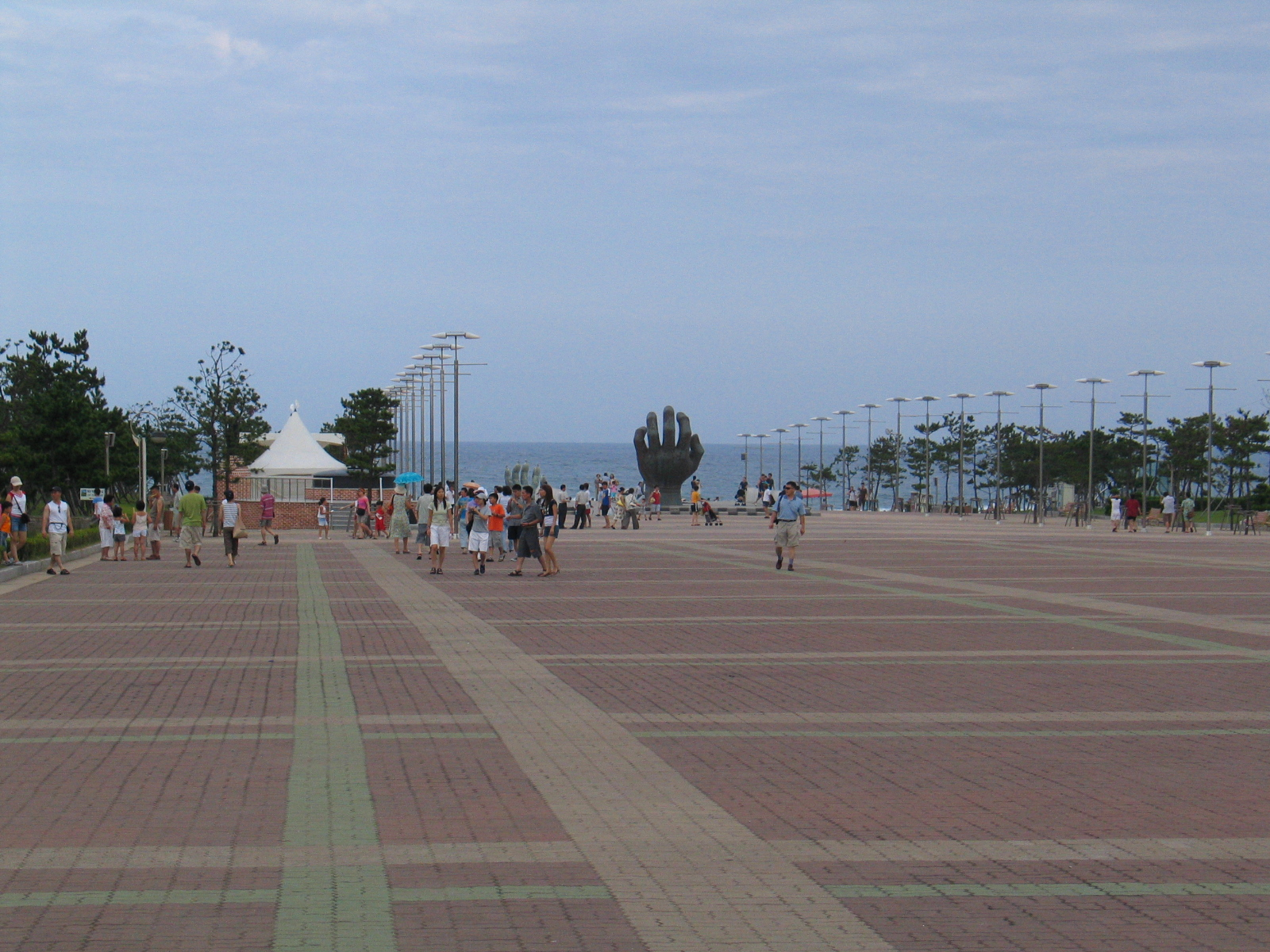
Homigot Park

== See also ==
- Homigot Lighthouse
- Yeongil bay (영일만)
- New Millennium memorial hall (새천년기념관)
- Pohang
