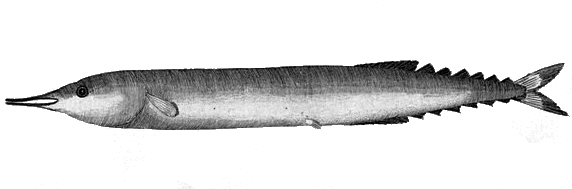

Scientific classification
- Kingdom: Animalia
- Phylum: Chordata
- Class: Actinopterygii
- Order: Beloniformes
- Family: Scomberesocidae
- Genus: Cololabis
- Species: C. adocetus

Binomial name
- Cololabis adocetus J.E. Böhlke, 1951

Synonyms
- Elassichthys adocetus (J.E. Böhlke, 1951)

= Saury =

Species of fish

The saury (Cololabis adocetus) is a species of fish that is a member of the family Scomberesocidae, or the saury family. It is widespread in the Eastern Pacific in the surface waters, typically remaining in the top 50 centimeters of the water column - although it can be found at depths of up to 1 meter. It can grow to a length of about 5 centimeters. The saury generally lives in waters between 5 and 12 degrees Celsius. The saury is a highly migratory fish.

== See also ==
- Pacific saury
