= Gwamegi =

Korean dried fish preparation

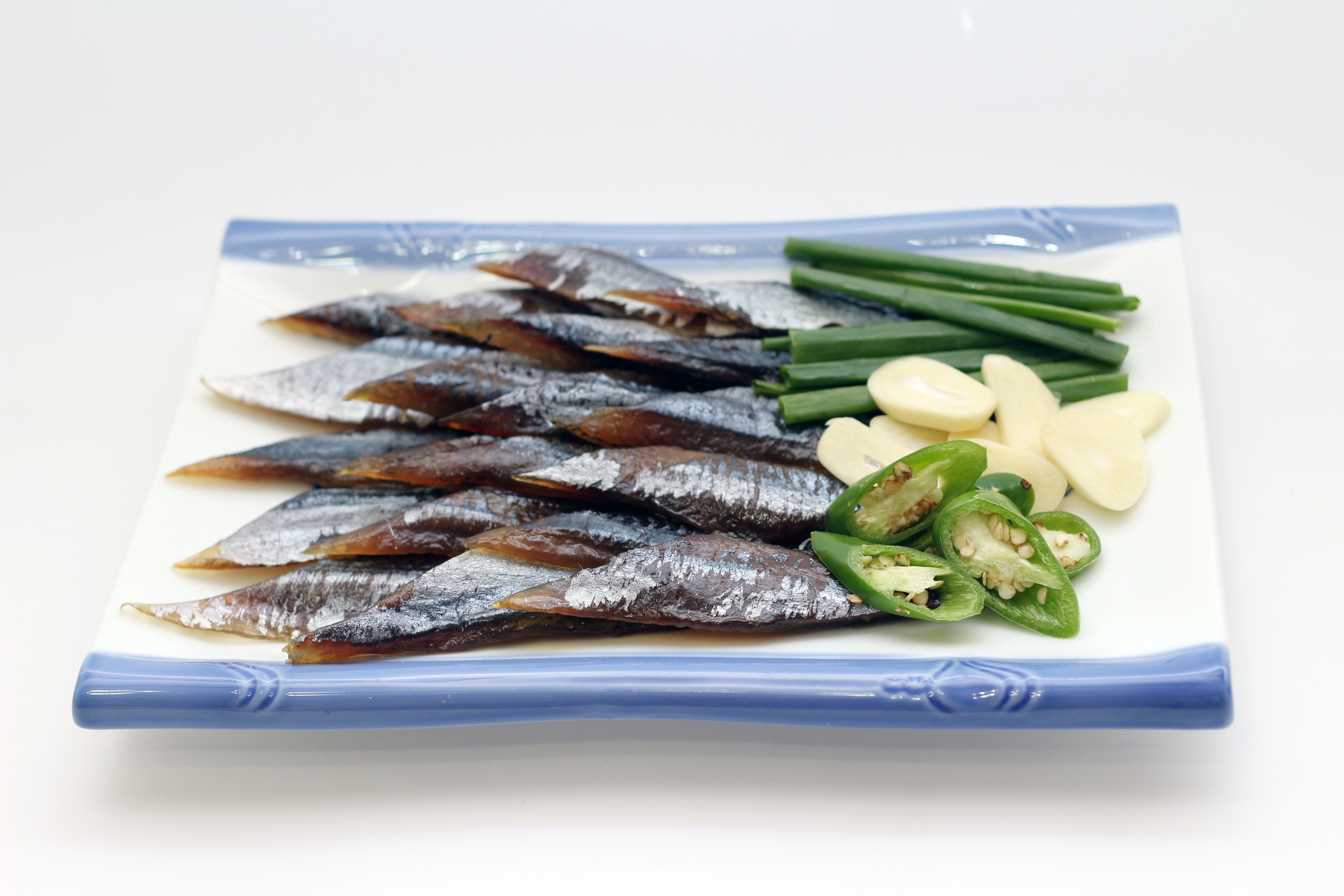
- Prepared gwamegi
- Associated cuisine: Korean cuisine

Korean name
- Hangul: 과메기
- RR: gwamegi
- MR: kwamegi

Gwamegi (Korean: 과메기) is a Korean half-dried Pacific herring or Pacific saury made during winter. It is mostly eaten in the region of North Gyeongsang Province in places such as Pohang, Uljin, and Yeongdeok, where a large amount of the fish are harvested. Guryongpo Harbor in Pohang is the most famous.

Fresh herring or saury is frozen at -10 degrees Celsius and is placed outdoors in December to repeat freezing at night and thawing during the day. The process continues until the water content of the fish drops to approximately 40%.

There are records of gwamegi in the Joseon era document Oju yŏnmun changjŏn san'go which mentions: "herring is smoked in order to prevent rotting". In another document Kyuhap ch'ongsŏ, it is written: "herring with clear eyes are chosen to be dried, which give an unusual taste".

The city of Pohang holds an annual Gwamegi Festival to promote the local specialty food. It started in 1997 to promote gwamegi and boost local economies. It is held in November every year and hosts various programs, such as a specialty product contest, free tasting events, and playing traditional Korean music. Some of the major events include the auction of gwamegi as well as guessing the weight of a gwamegi.

== History ==
Pohang's Yeongil Bay, which is full of seaweed, was a place where herring schools scattered in the winter. The herring was a major food item when it was thrown into a net, but the problem was how to keep it so that it could be eaten at all times. However, someone hung the herring in a small kitchen exhaust window, which had a smoking effect because of the smoke coming from the kitchen.

Since then, people have all hung herring in the kitchen window and started to spend the winter. The herring was frozen in the cold winter winds, then thawed and dried during the cooking cycle, leaving half dry. The people of Yeonngil Bay who learned how to freeze and dry the fish further developed by doing this by placing herring on the beach of Guryongpo, where the sun was blazing during the day and the cool sea breeze was hanging at night.

Herring has drastically decreased in Yeongil Bay since the 1960s, so locals turned to making gwamegi with mackerel pike, which is caught in large quantities, and it tasted as good as herring. Even today, gwamegi is still made from mackerel pike.

Acting both as a research center and a tourist attraction, the Gwamegi Culture Museum (구룡포 과메기 문화관), a large museum detailing the history, science and traditions behind gwamegi, was opened in Guryongpo in 2016.

== Gallery ==
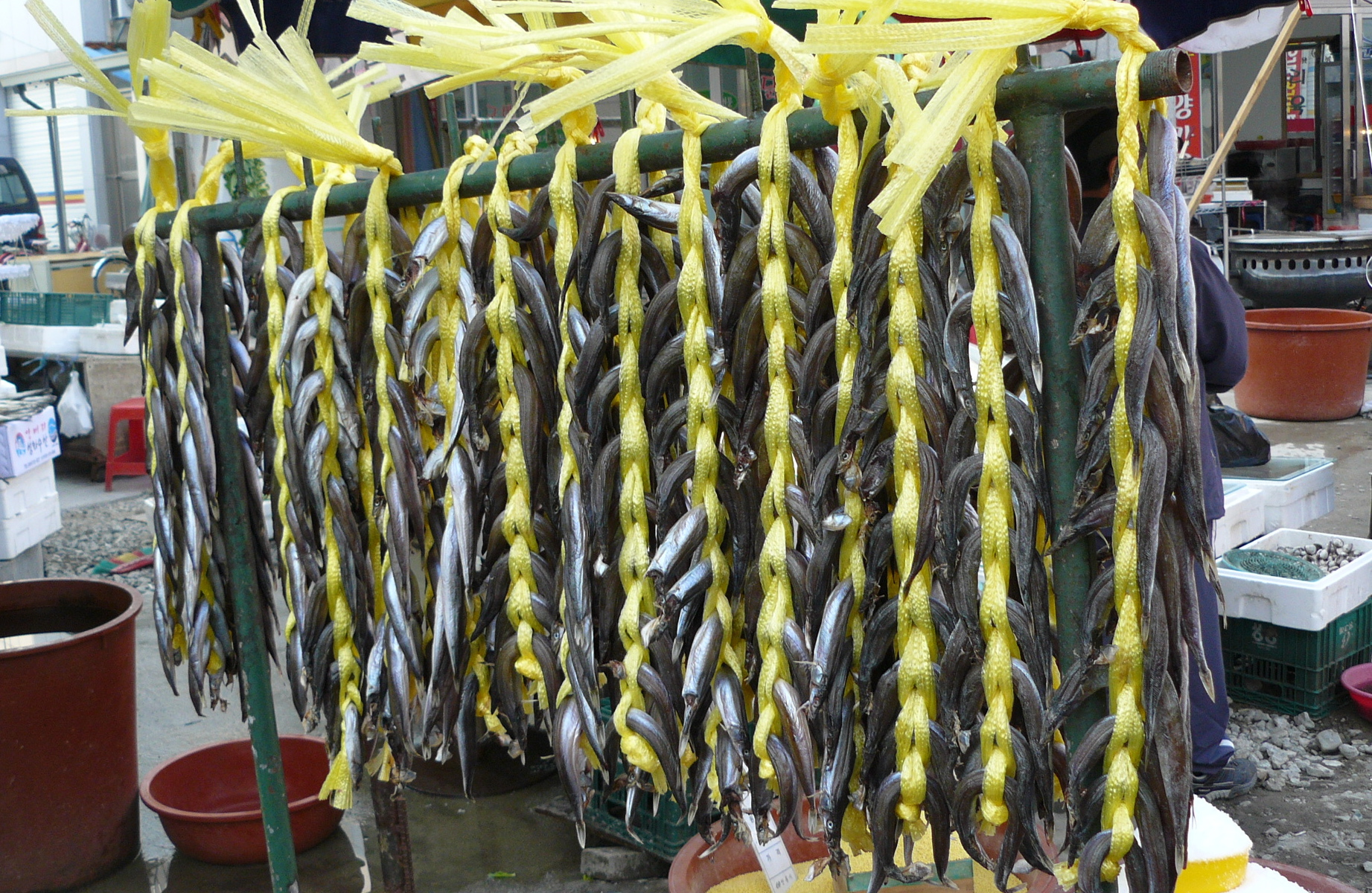
Drying gwamegi

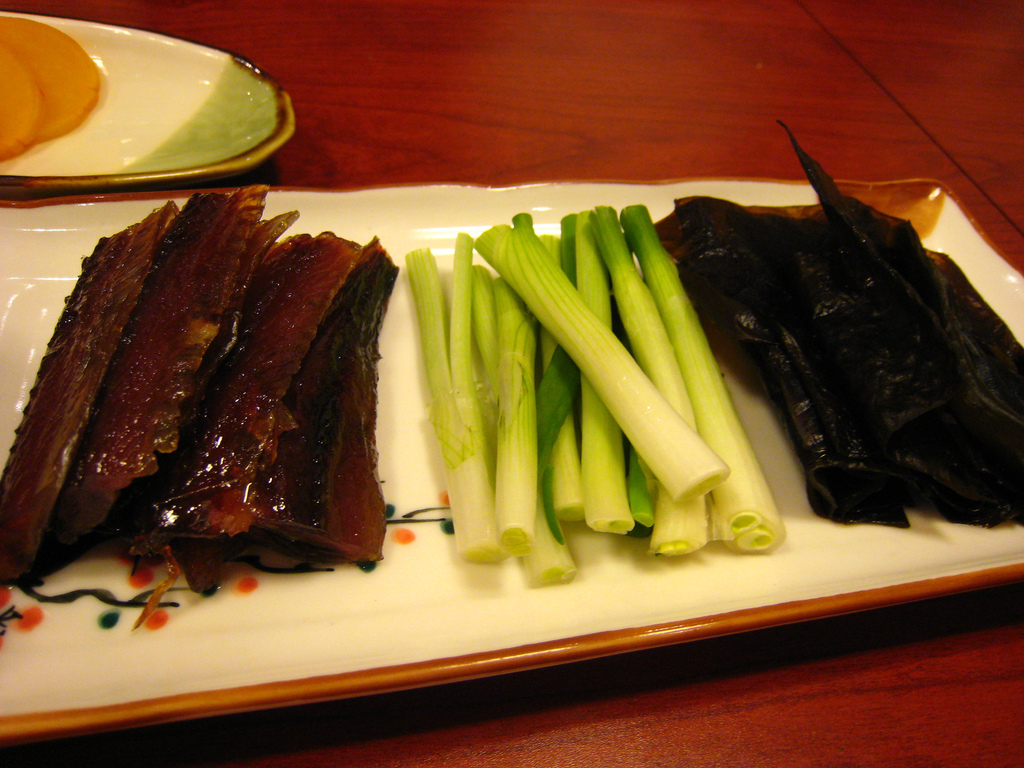
Prepared gwamegi with ssam

== See also ==
- Soused herring, Dutch raw herring
- Dried and salted cod
- Hoe (dish)
- Gravlax, Scandinavian cured raw salmon
- Korean cuisine
- List of dried foods
- List of smoked foods
- Lox, Jewish cured salmon fillet
- Lutefisk, Scandinavian salted/dried whitefish
- Rakfisk, Norwegian salted and fermented fish
