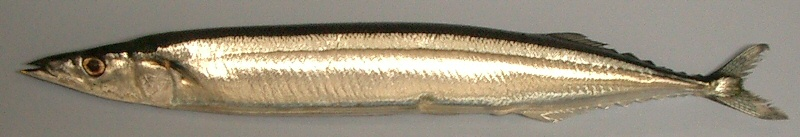
- Cololabis saira

Scientific classification
- Domain: Eukaryota
- Kingdom: Animalia
- Phylum: Chordata
- Class: Actinopterygii
- Order: Beloniformes
- Family: Scomberesocidae
- Genus: Cololabis; T. N. Gill, 1896

Type species
- Scombresox brevirostris Peters, 1866

= Cololabis =

Genus of fishes

Cololabis is a genus of sauries found in the eastern and northern Pacific Ocean. The name is derived from the Greek word kolos, meaning 'short', and the Latin word labis, meaning 'forceps', referring to the short beak of the type species Scombresox brevirostris.

== Species ==
There are currently two recognized species in this genus:

- Cololabis adocetus J. E. Böhlke, 1951 (Saury)
- Cololabis saira Brevoort, 1856 (Pacific saury)
