= Ulgi Lighthouse =

Ulgi Lighthouse Daewangam
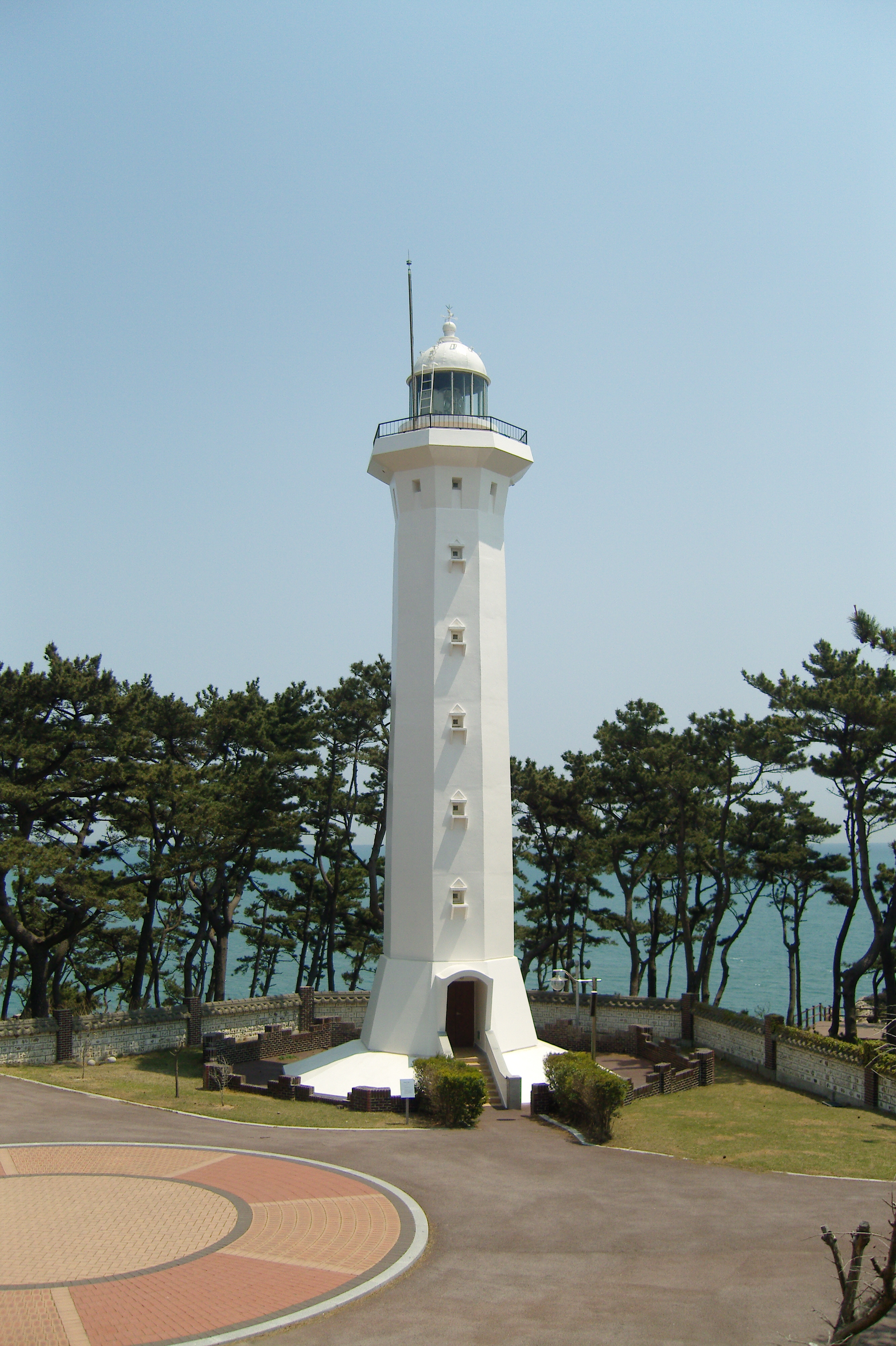
- Current Ulgi Lighthouse
- Location: Ulsan; Yeongnam; South Korea
- Coordinates: 35°29′34.03″N 129°26′34.86″E

Tower
- Constructed: 1906 (first)
- Construction: concrete tower
- Height: 24 metres (79 ft) (current); 6 metres (20 ft) (first)
- Shape: octagonal tower with balcony and lantern
- Markings: white tower and lantern

Light
- First lit: 1994 (current)
- Deactivated: 1994 (first)
- Focal height: 52 metres (171 ft)
- Range: 26 nautical miles (48 km; 30 mi)
- Characteristic: Fl W 10s.

The Ulgi Lighthouse (Korean: 울기등대) is a lighthouse in Ulsan, South Korea.

== History ==
The lighthouse commenced operations in 1906.
