= Guryongpo =

Coordinates: 35°59′N 129°33′E

- Town
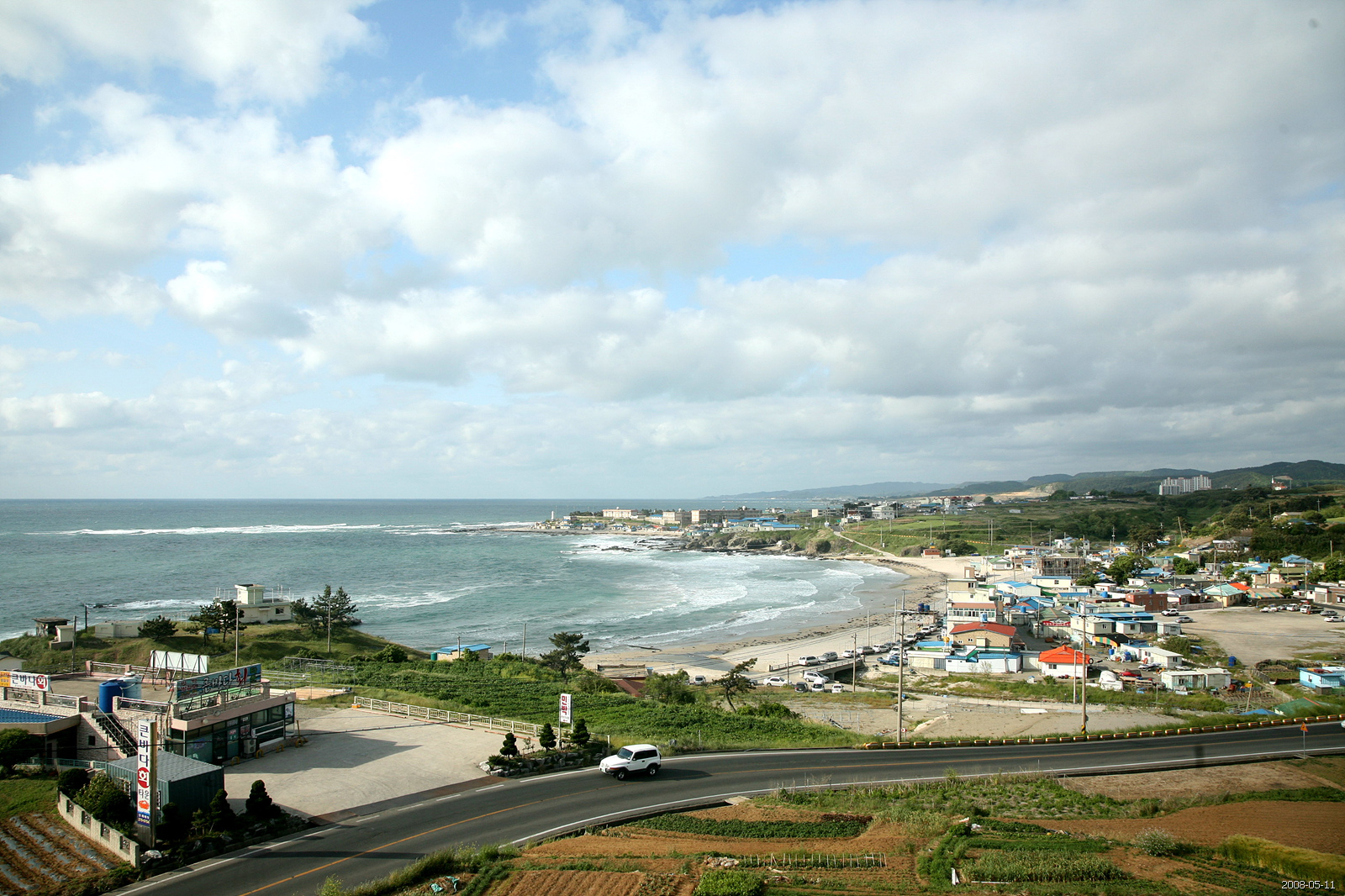
- Interactive map of Guryongpo
- Country: South Korea
- Province: North Gyeongsang
- City: Pohang
- Non-autonomous District: Nam-gu
- Administrative divisions: 10 beopjeongni, 28 hangjeongni and 209 ban

Area
  - Total: 45.17 km^{2} (17.44 sq mi)

Population (2015.5)
  - Total: 9,099
  - Density: 201.4/km^{2} (521.7/sq mi)
- Website: Guryongpo Town

Korean name
- Hangul: 구룡포읍
- Hanja: 九龍浦邑
- RR: Guryongpo-eup
- MR: Kuryongp'o-ŭp

Guryongpo (Korean: 구룡포읍) is a town, or eup in Nam-gu, Pohang, North Gyeongsang Province, South Korea. The township Changju-myeon was upgraded to the town Guryongpo-eup in 1942. Guryongpo Town Office is located in Hudong-ri. One of the local culinary specialties of Guryongpo is gwamegi a partially dried fish.

== Communities ==
Guryongpo-eup is divided into 10 villages (ri).

| | Hangul | Hanja |
|---|---|---|
| Guryongpo-ri | 구룡포리 | 九龍浦里 |
| Samjeong-ri | 삼정리 | 三政里 |
| Seokbyeong-ri | 석병리 | 石屛里 |
| Seongdong-ri | 성동리 | 城洞里 |
| Gupyeong-ri | 구평리 | 邱坪里 |
| Janggil-ri | 장길리 | 長吉里 |
| Hajeong-ri | 하정리 | 河亭里 |
| Byeongpo-ri | 병포리 | 柄浦里 |
| Hudong-ri | 후동리 | 厚洞里 |
| Nultae-ri | 눌태리 | 訥台里 |
