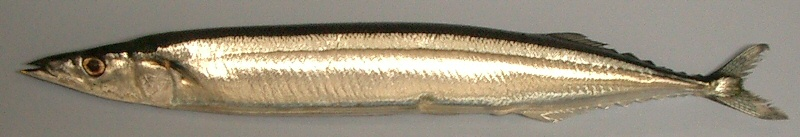

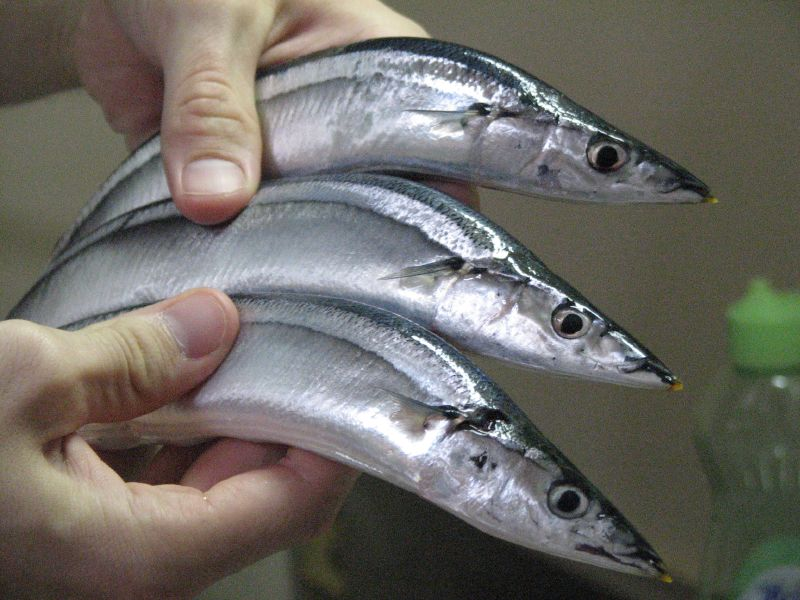

Scientific classification
- Kingdom: Animalia
- Phylum: Chordata
- Class: Actinopterygii
- Division: Teleostei
- Order: Beloniformes
- Family: Scomberesocidae
- Genus: Cololabis
- Species: C. saira

Binomial name
- Cololabis saira (Brevoort, 1856)

Synonyms
- Scomberesox saira Brevoort, 1856; Scombresox brevirostris Peters, 1866

= Pacific saury =

Species of fish

The Pacific saury (Cololabis saira) is species of fish in the family Scomberesocidae. Saury is a seafood in several East Asian cuisines and is also known by the name mackerel pike.

== Biology ==
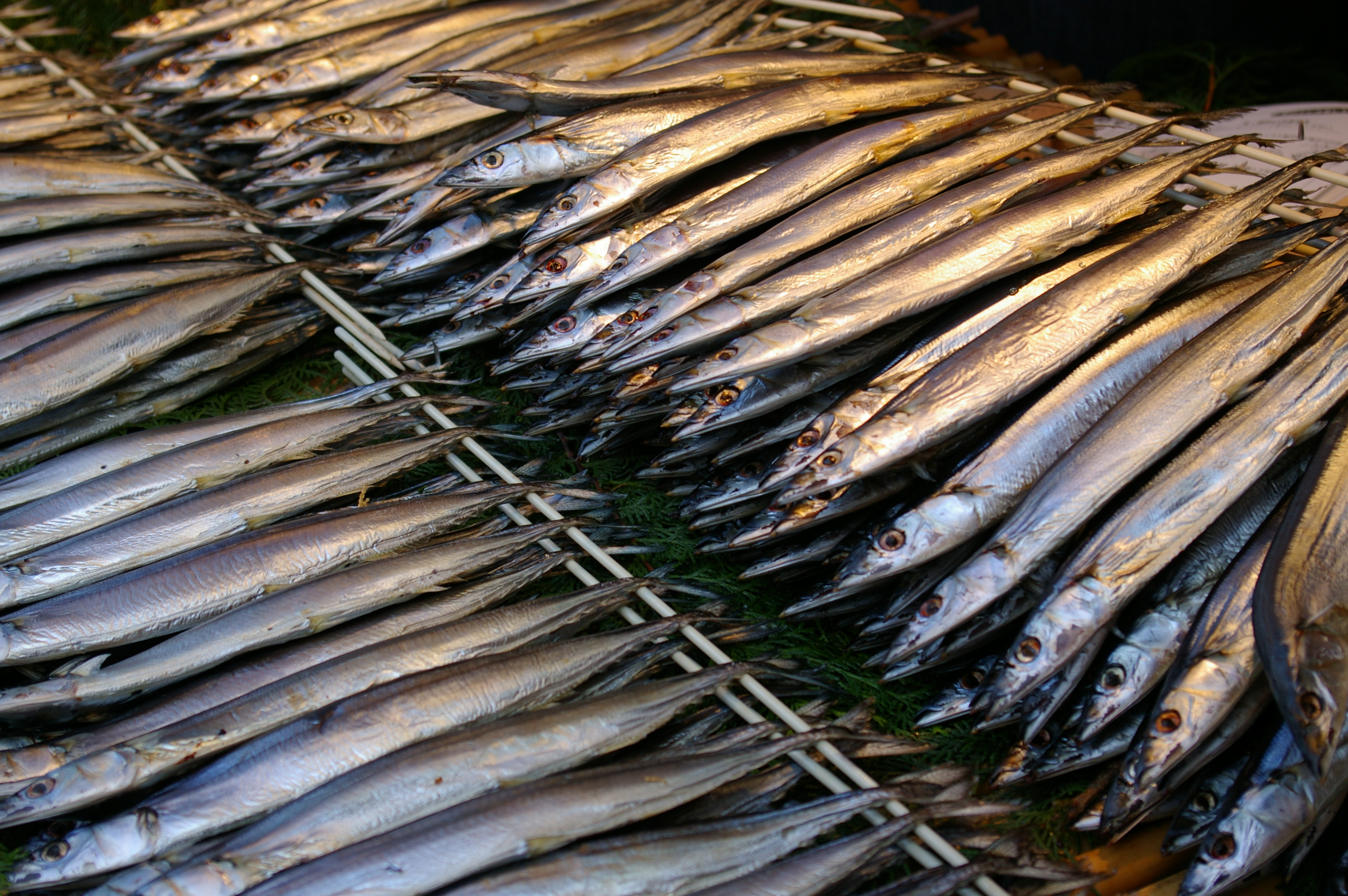
Drying pacific saury

Saury is a fish with a small mouth, an elongated body, a series of small finlets between the dorsal and anal fins, and a small forked tail. The fish's color is dark green to blue on the dorsal surface, silvery below, and there are small, bright blue blotches distributed randomly on the sides.

It is typically about 25–30 centimetres (9.8–11.8 inches) long when caught, but it can grow up to 40 centimetres (16 inches) long and about 180 grams (6.3 ounces) when caught in the autumn. The life expectancy of Saury is approximately four years. Saury is a pelagic fish typically found and harvested close to the surface, but it can also be found down to depths of up to 230 metres (750 feet). When saury is escaping from predators, it floats on the surface and is similar to other fishes within the genus.

These schooling fish are found in the North Pacific, from China, Korea and Japan eastward to the Gulf of Alaska and southward to sub-tropical Mexico, preferring temperatures around 15–18 degrees Celsius (59–64 degrees Fahrenheit).

The Pacific saury is a highly migratory species. Adults are generally found offshore, near the surface of the ocean, in schools. Juveniles associate with drifting seaweed. Pacific saury are oviparous. Eggs are attached to floating objects, such as seaweed, via filaments on the shell surface.

The saury feeds on zooplankton, such as copepods, krill, amphipods, and the eggs and larvae of common fish, such as anchovies, due to their lack of stomach, and their short straight intestines. The internal organs of the saury may contain small, red, earthworm-like parasites named Rhadinorhynchus selkirki; these are harmless.

A few of the natural predators of Pacific saury include marine mammals, squid and tuna.

Saury oil contains considerable levels of n-3 unsaturated fatty acids (PUFA) and long-chain monounsaturated fatty acids (LCMUFA) with aliphatic tails longer than 18 carbons.

== Uses ==
=== Japan ===
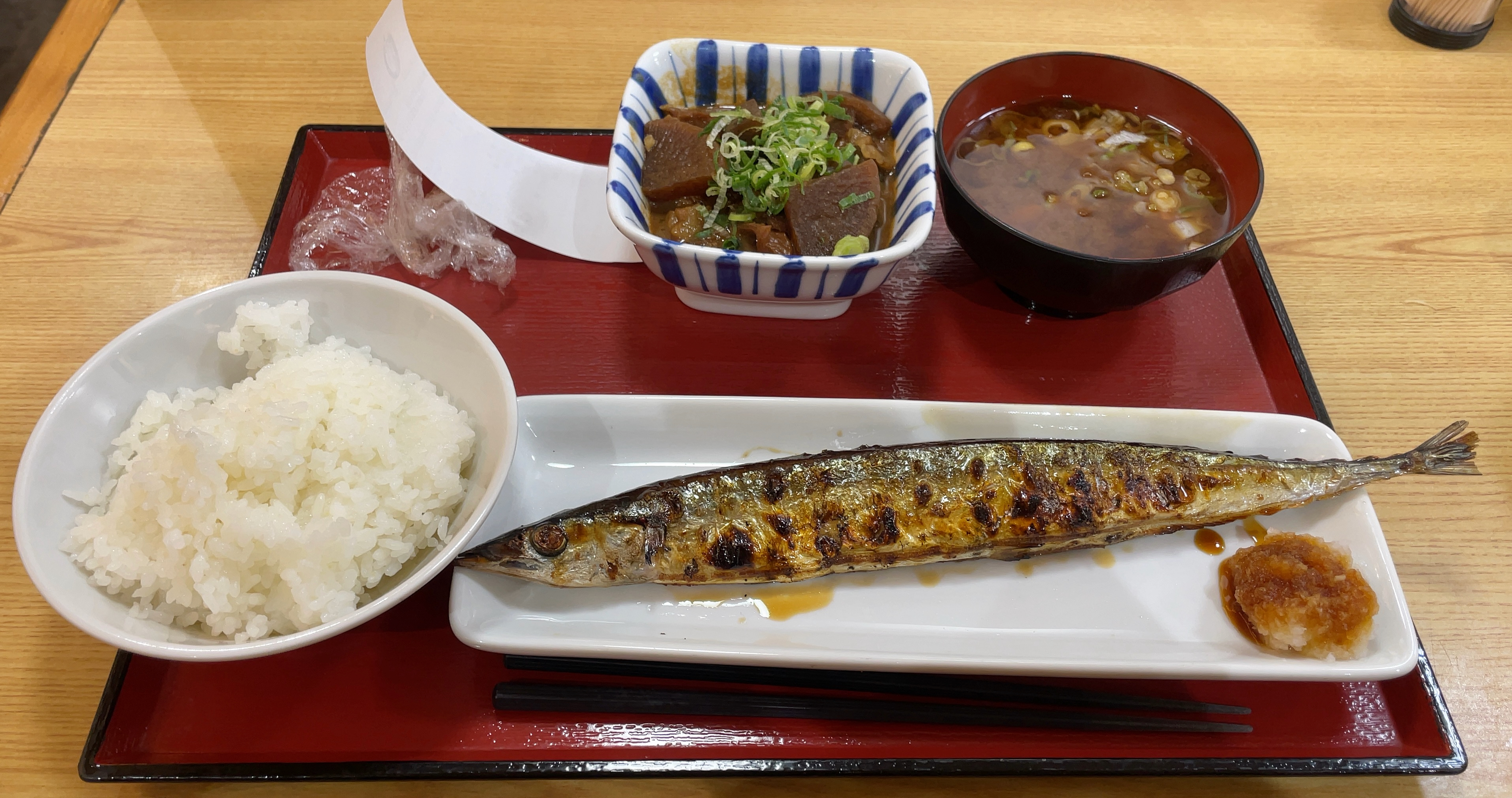
Grilled sanma as part of a meal with rice, miso soup, and nimono

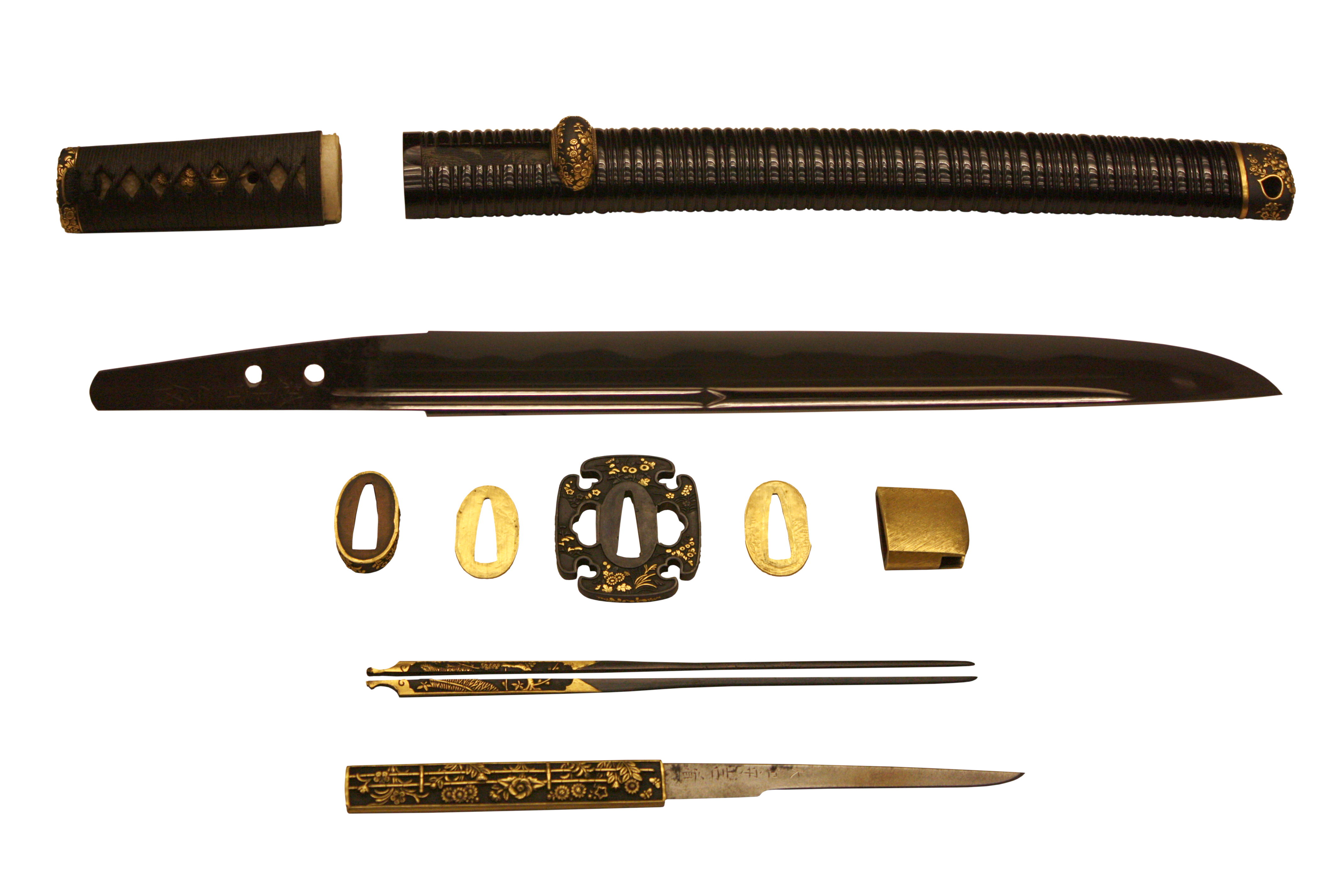
The name (秋刀魚 "autumn knife fish") comes from the shape and color of a katana sword.

Pacific saury is known as sanma (さんま/サンマ) or saira (さいら/サイラ) in Japanese. The kanji used in the Japanese name of the fish (秋刀魚) literally translates as "autumn knife fish," as its body shape resembles a katana.

Saury is one of the most prominent seasonal foods representing autumn in Japanese cuisine. It is most commonly served salted and grilled (broiled) whole, garnished with daikon oroshi (grated daikon) and served alongside a bowl of rice and a bowl of miso soup. Other condiments may include soy sauce, sudachi, lime, lemon, or other citrus juices. The intestines are bitter, but many people choose not to gut the fish, as many say its bitterness, balanced by the condiments, is part of the enjoyment.

It also has many small bones, though not as many as sardines. Saury festivals are held in various parts of Japan, such as the Meguro Autumn Sanma Festival.

Sanma sashimi is becoming increasingly available but is not common. Although rarely used for sushi, sanma-zushi is a regional delicacy along parts of the Kii Peninsula, especially along the coast of southern Mie Prefecture. It is prepared by pickling the saury in salt and vinegar (depending on the region, bitter orange or citron vinegar may be used), and then placing it on top of vinegared rice to create the finished sushi.

The fish can also be pan-fried or canned kabayaki.

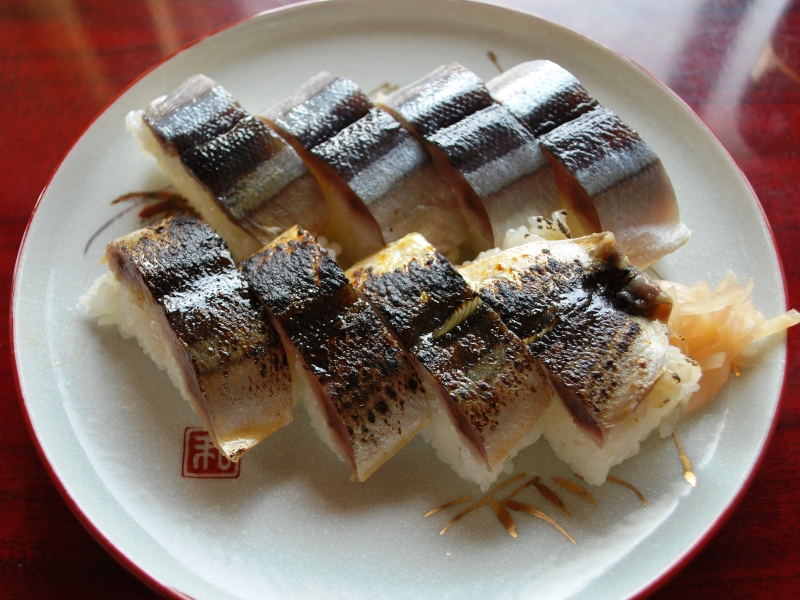
As sushi

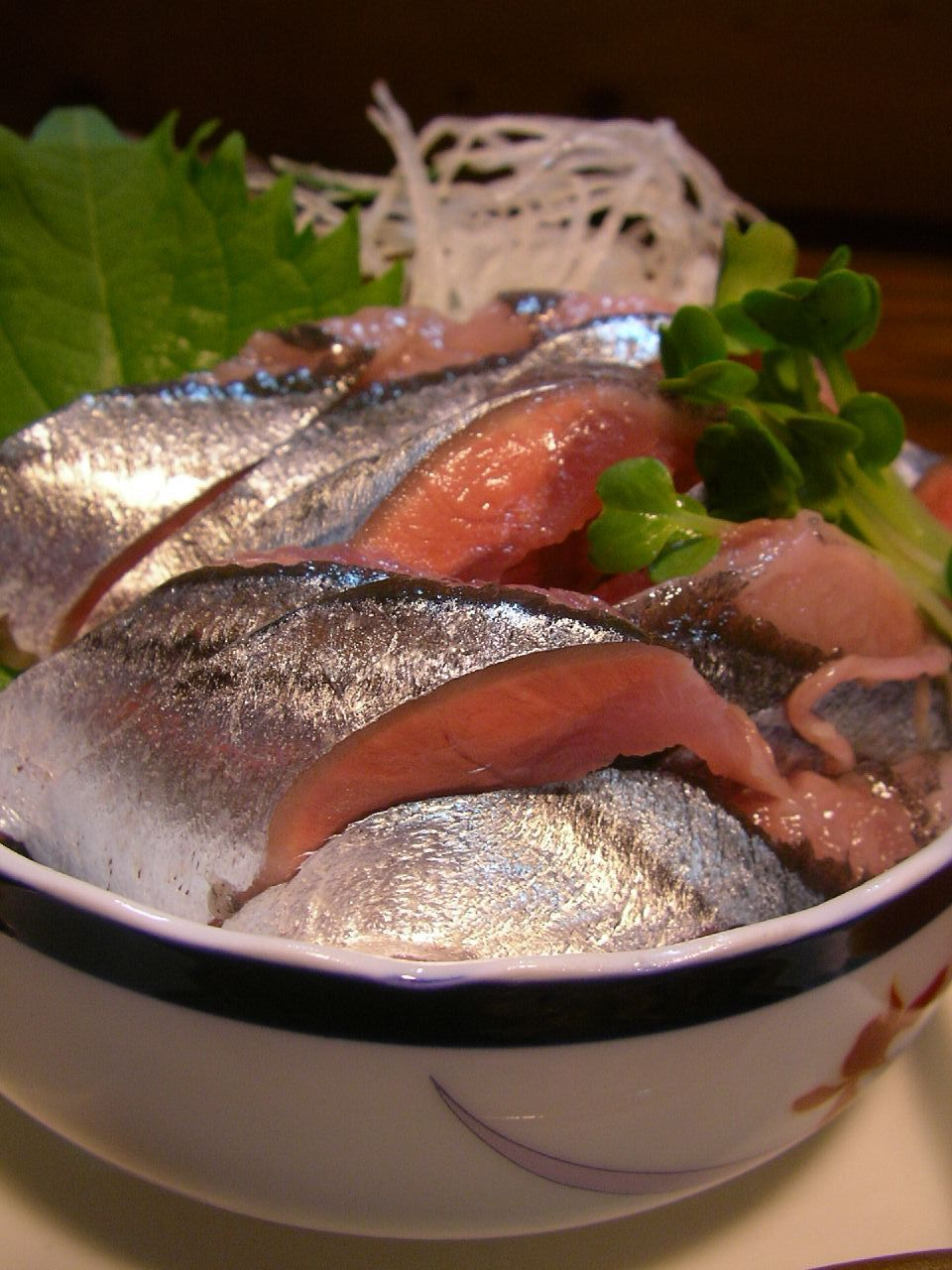
As sashimi

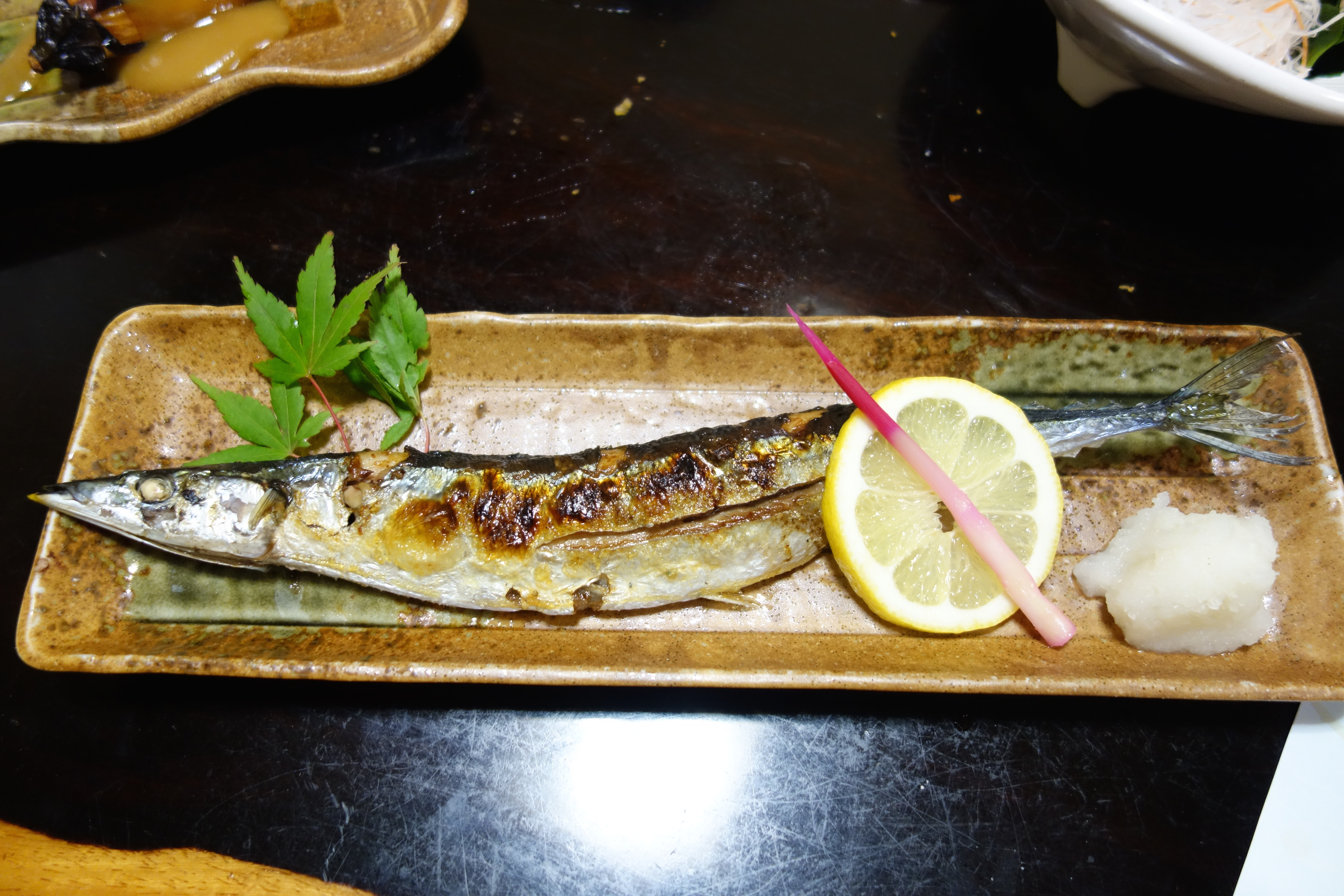
Grilled with salt

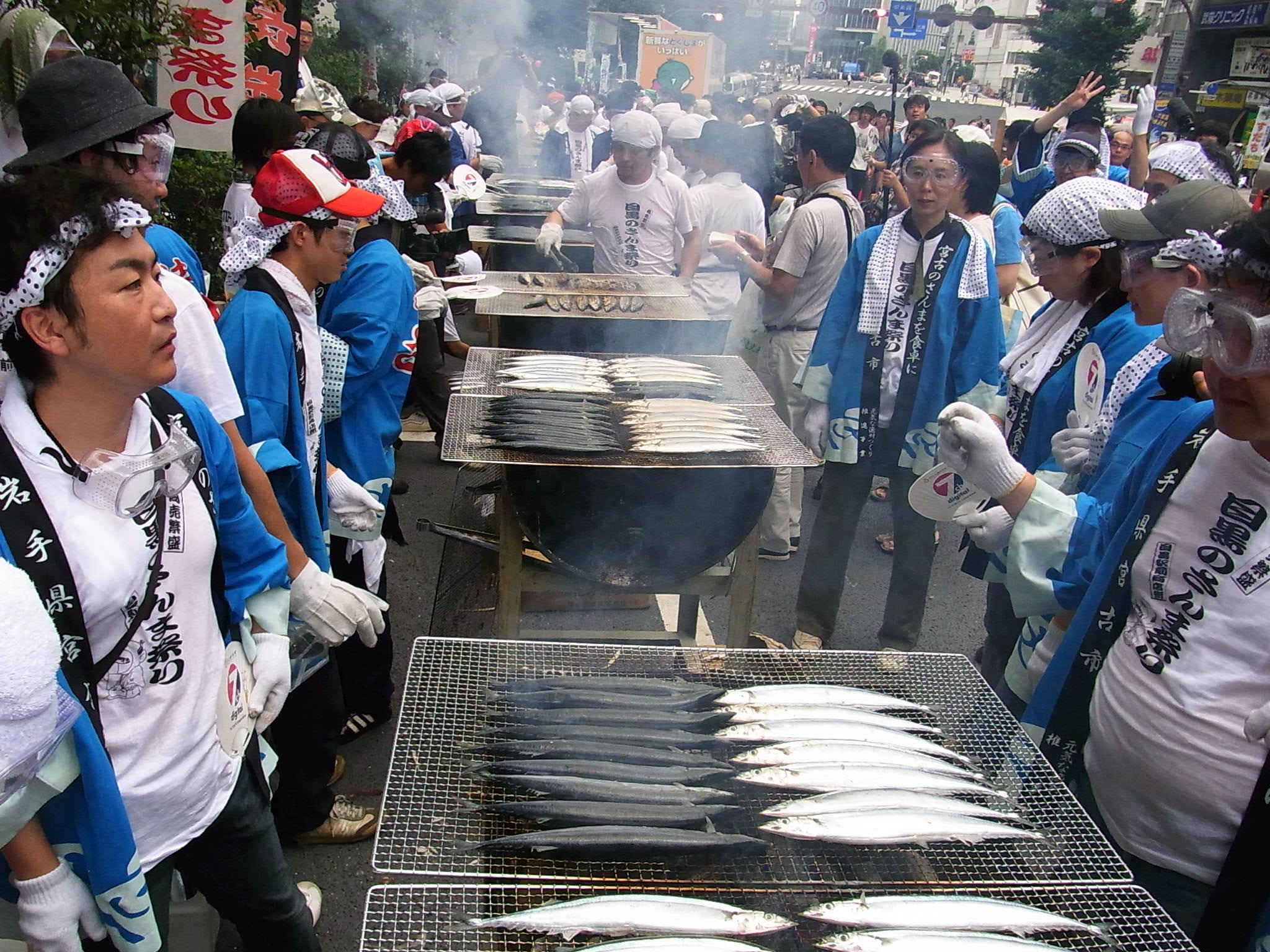
Sanma festival in Meguro

=== Korea ===
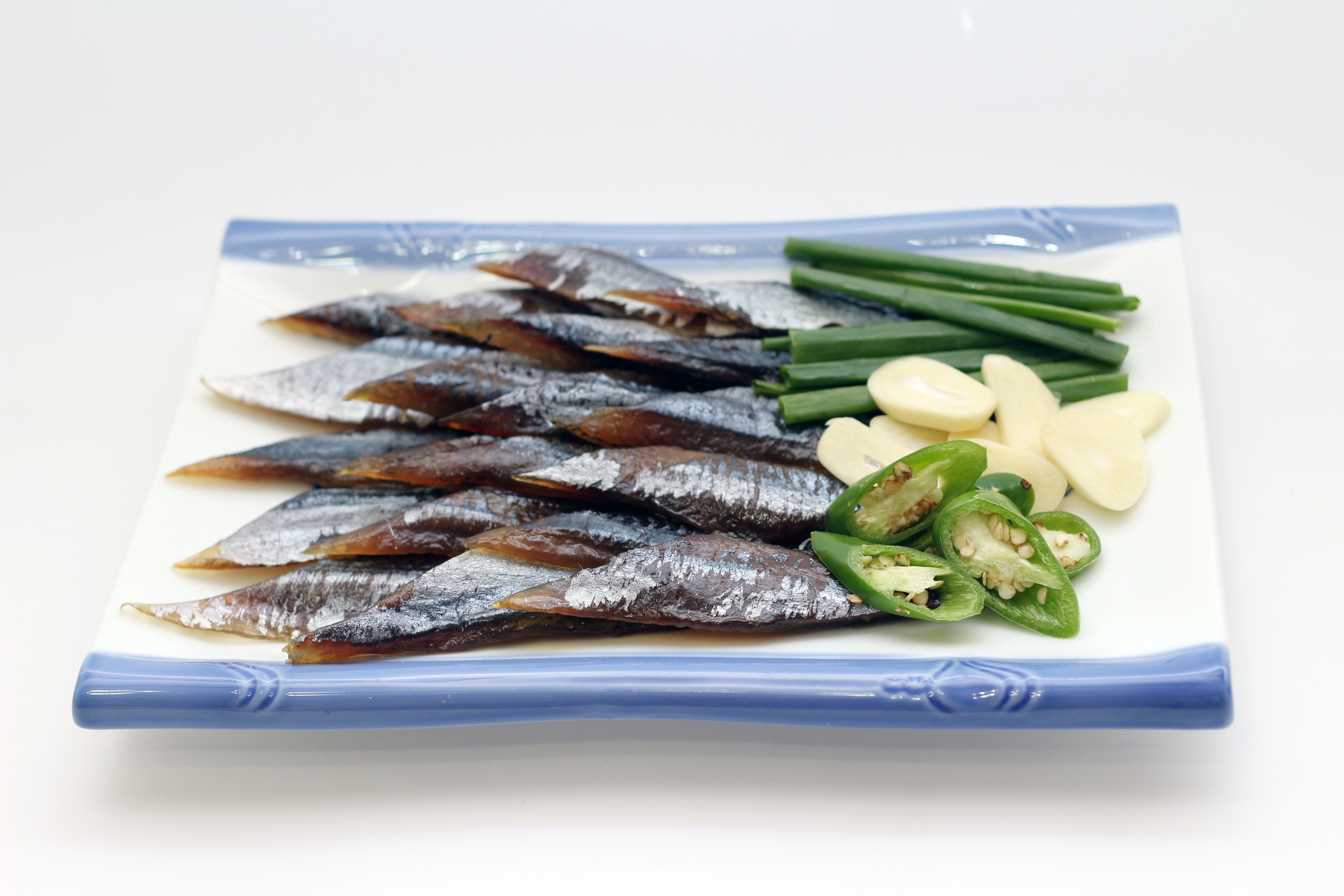
Korean gwamegi

Pacific saury is called kkongchi (꽁치) in Korean. Ulleung island's hand-caught saury is used in other local recipes such as mulhoe (cold raw fish soup) and tteokguk (rice cake soup).

Gwamegi is a Korean dish of half-dried Pacific saury made during winter. It is mostly eaten in the region of North Gyeongsang Province in places such as Pohang, Uljin, and Yeongdeok, where a large amount of the fish are harvested.

Simmered saury (Korean: 꽁치조림; RR: kkongchi jorim) is a common variety of jorim (Korean simmered foods). Salt-grilled saury is known as kkongchi gui (꽁치구이) in Korea.

=== Russia ===
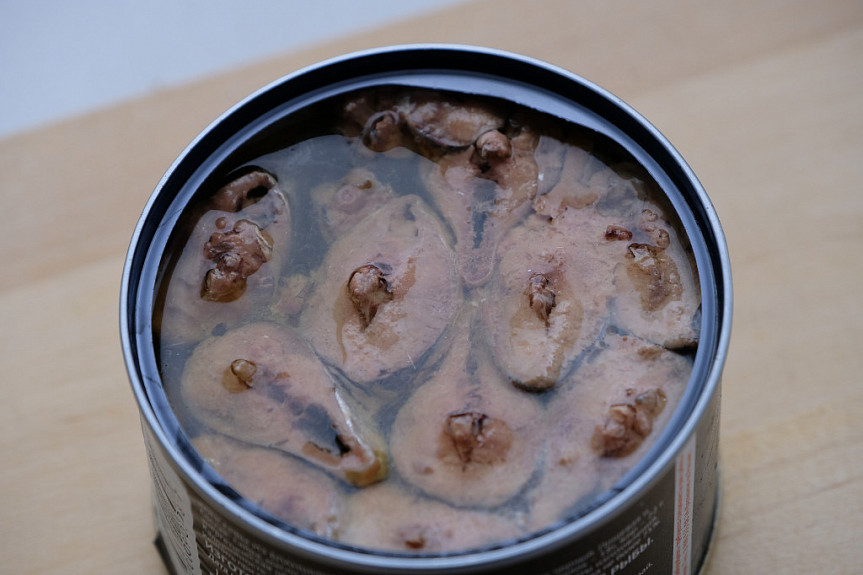
Open can of saury

Called saira (сайра) in Russian, Pacific saury is popular in Russia, which directly accesses the Pacific Ocean. In Russia, it is sold canned with salt and spice, sometimes with the addition of vegetable oil or tomato sauce. It is also eaten smoked.

=== United Kingdom ===
Pacific saury is used as bait for pike and sea fishing. In the UK, they are usually called blueys, possibly due to people confusing the Pacific saury with blue mackerel.

== Fishing ==
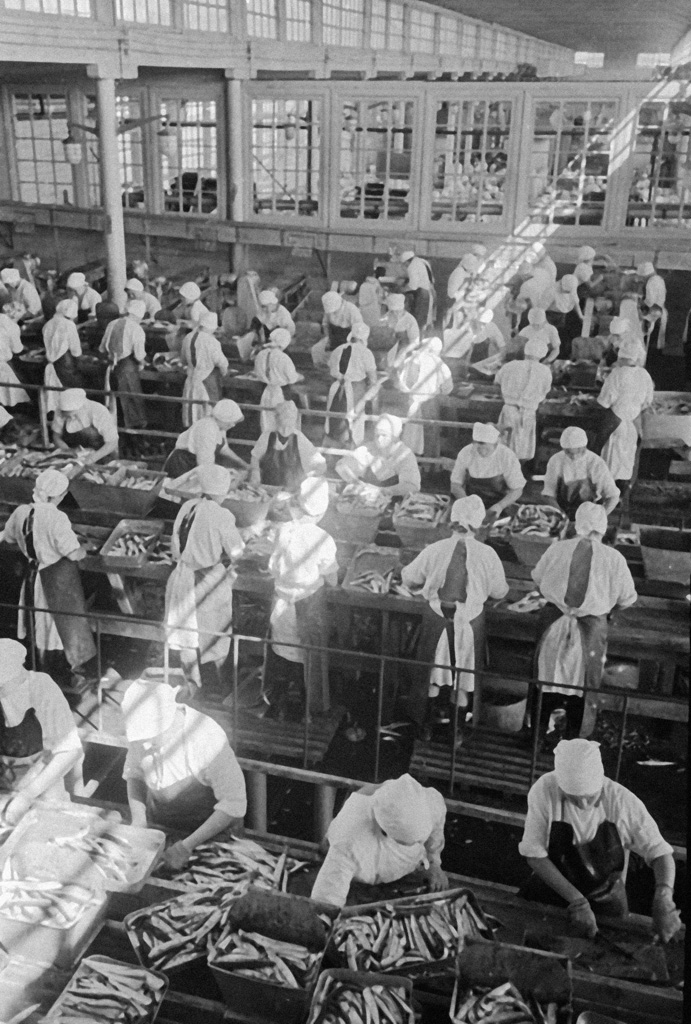
Processing pacific saury on Shikotan Island, 1969

Global capture production of Pacific saury (Cololabis saira) in thousand tonnes from 1950 to 2022, as reported by the FAO

Around 1950, Japan caught about 98% of the catch and South Korea about 2%, but Japan's catch share has decreased proportionally in recent decades. Other nations that fish saury now include China and Taiwan. The Soviet Union fished saury around 1960 until the dissolution of the country. Taiwan began fishing for saury around 1988 and has been expanding its catch. In 2002, the Chinese also started fishing for saury, and they have been catching over 100,000 tons a year.

Approximately ninety Taiwanese vessels participate in the long distance North Pacific fishery. Taiwan's total Pacific saury landings were 30k metric tons in 2021 and 40k metric tons in 2022. Boats in the Taiwanese saury fishery have been transitioning from incandescent and high-intensity discharge (HID) light bulbs to light emitting diodes (LED) which allows them for an environmental impact reduction.

== Gallery ==
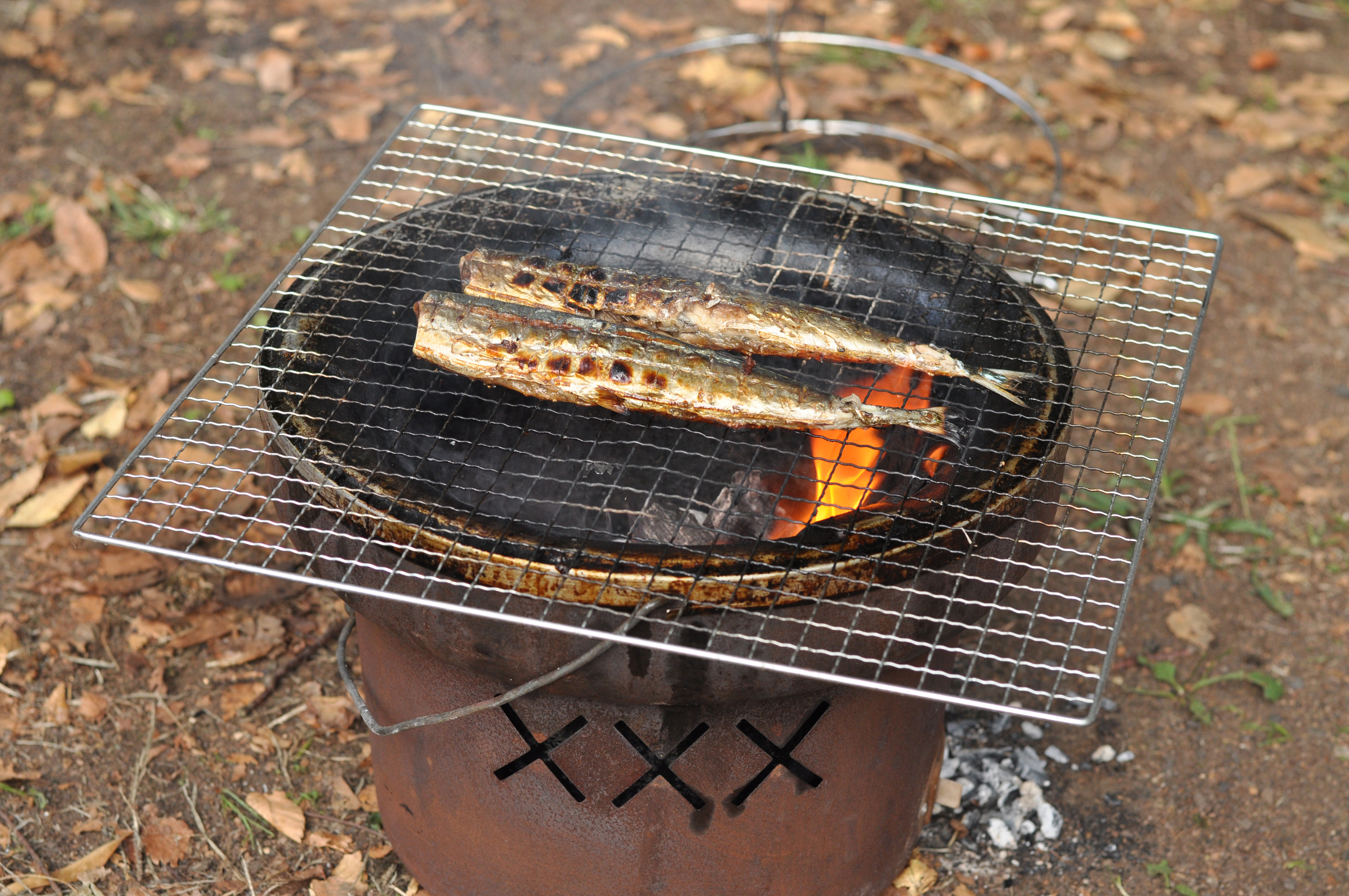
Charcoal‐grilled on a shichirin

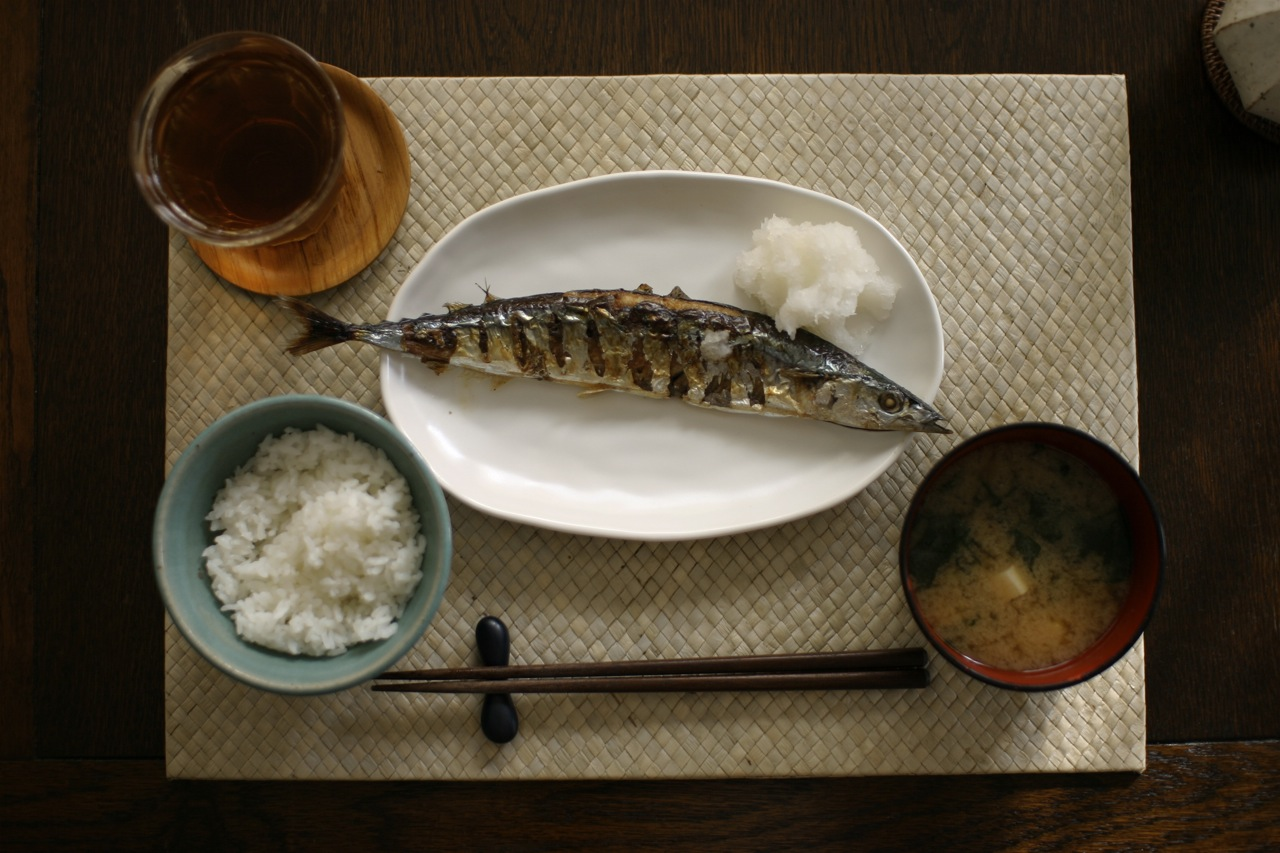
With miso soup and rice

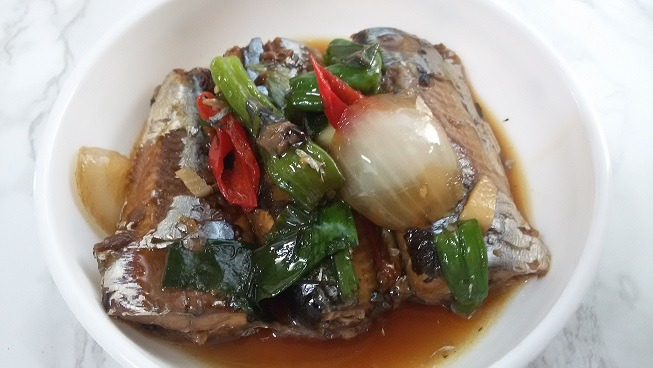
Kkongchi-jorim

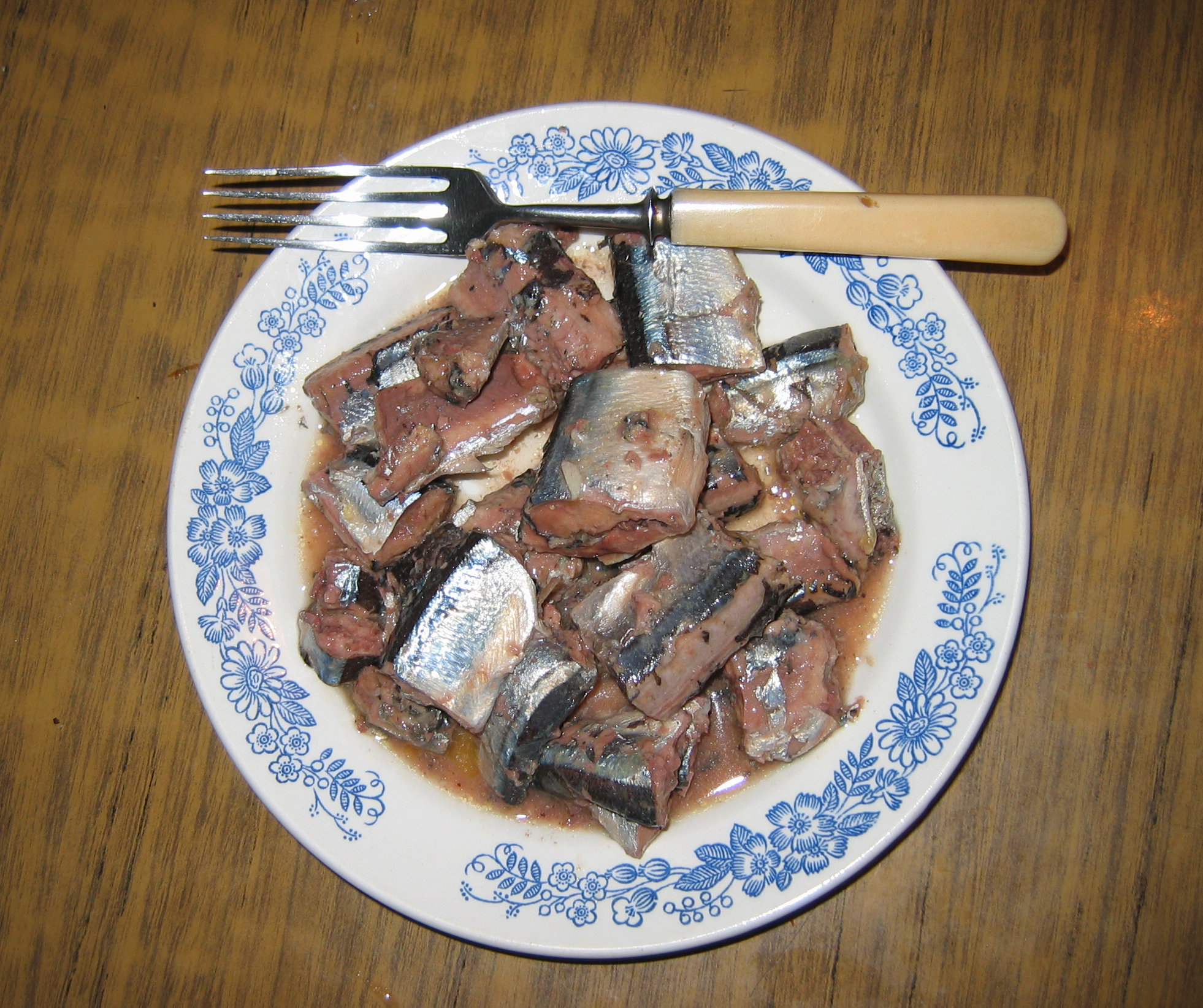
Tinned Pacific saury produced in Russia
