= Homigot Lighthouse =

Homigot Lighthouse 호미곶등대
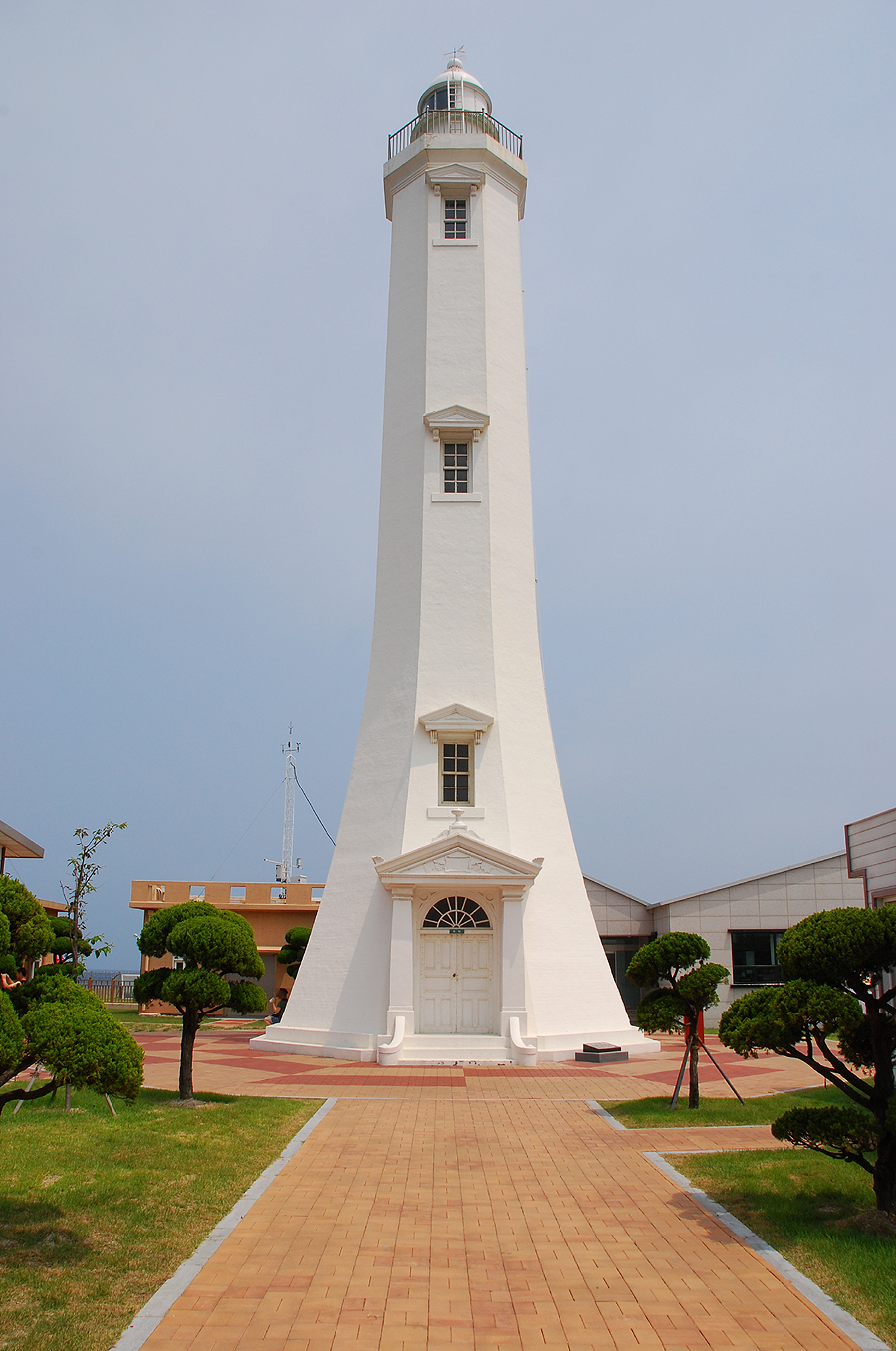
- Location: Pohang, Yeongnam, South Korea
- Coordinates: 36°04′35″N 129°34′07″E

Tower
- Constructed: 1903
- Construction: brick (tower)
- Height: 26.4 m (87 ft)
- Shape: six-storey tapered octagonal tower with balcony and lantern
- Markings: White
- Power source: mains electricity

Light
- Focal height: 31 m (102 ft)
- Range: 27 nmi (50 km; 31 mi)
- Characteristic: Fl W 12s

The Homigot Lighthouse (Korean: 호미곶등대) is an active lighthouse in Pohang, South Korea. With a height of 26.4 metres (87 ft), it is the tallest in South Korea.

== History ==
The lighthouse was built in 1903 after a Japanese ship sank nearby in 1901. The lighthouse, which is the tallest in South Korea, was designed by French architects and built by Chinese contractors, and was completed in December 1903. The lighthouse was built with bricks without the use of rebar despite its height; inside it is divided into six-storeys and each ceiling is decorated with pear tree flower in honor of the Joseon dynasty. The lighthouse is still active and operated by Ministry of Oceans and Fisheries.
