= Yeongil Bay =

Bay near Busan, South Korea

- 영일만 (Korean)
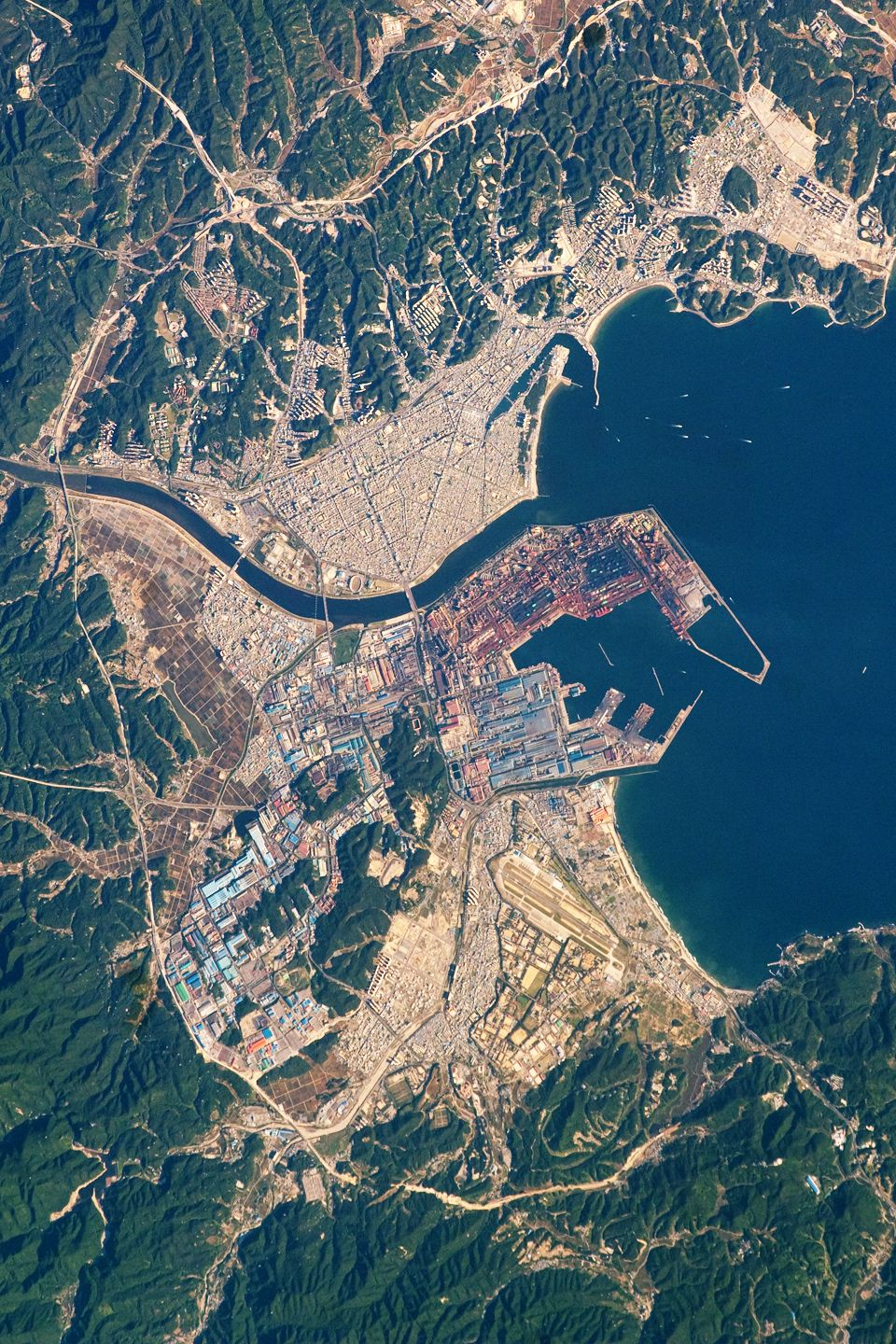
- Yeongil Bay with Pohang Port

- Location within South Korea
- Location: Pohang, South Korea
- Coordinates: 36.0502°N 129.4553°E
- Part of: Sea of Japan
- River sources: Hyeongsan River
- Ocean/sea sources: Pacific Ocean
- Max. length: 13 km (8.1 mi)
- Max. width: 10 km (6.2 mi)
- Surface area: 115 km (71 mi)
- Max. depth: 30 m (98 ft)

Korean name
- Hangul: 영일만
- Hanja: 迎日灣
- RR: Yeongilman
- MR: Yŏngilman

Yeongil Bay (Korean: 영일만) is a bay located in Pohang, South Korea. The entrance of the bay opens to the northeast, and leads to the Sea of Japan. It is the largest bay on the eastern coast of South Korea.

The greatest depth is about 30 m.

The Old and the New Pohang Port are located in the bay.

The bay is heavily polluted by the industries in Pohang Port.
