= Wongaksa =

Wongaksa may refer to:

- Wongaksa Pagoda, Seoul, South Korea
- Wongaksa (Gwangju)
- Wongaksa (Gigye, Pohang)
