= Tiger and Turtle – Magic Mountain =

Art installation in Germany

Coordinates: 51.3756°N 6.7380°E

Tiger and Turtle – Magic Mountain is an art installation and landmark in Duisburg, Germany, built in 2011. It was designed by Ulrich Genth and Heike Mutter. It resembles a roller coaster, but it is a walkway with stairs. Its vertical loop continues the walkway and stairs but is blocked off. In 2013, Tiger and Turtle – Magic Mountain was ranked as #6 on HuffPost's list of Most Extreme Staircases.

== Gallery ==
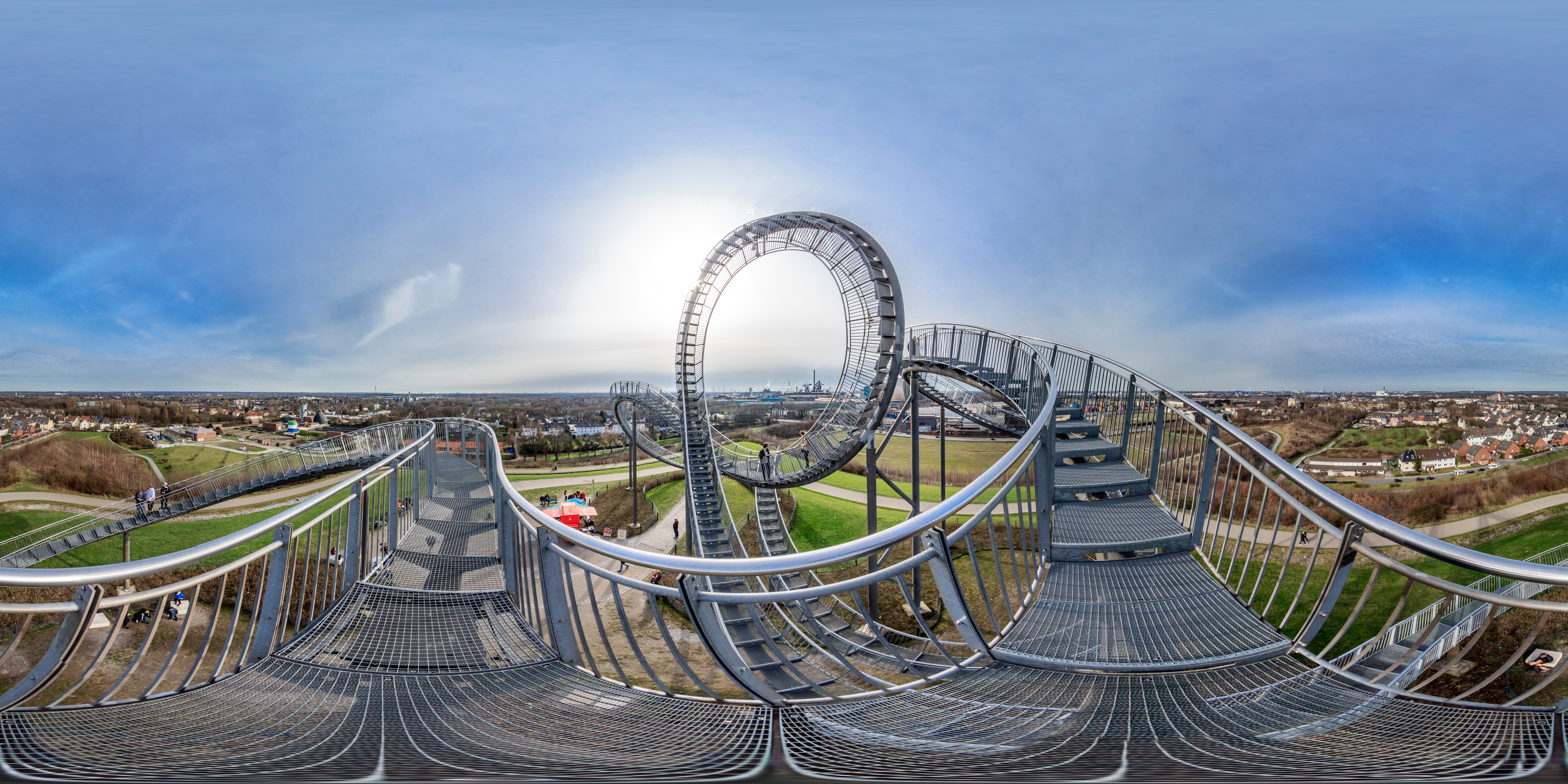
360° panorama (view as a 360° interactive panorama)

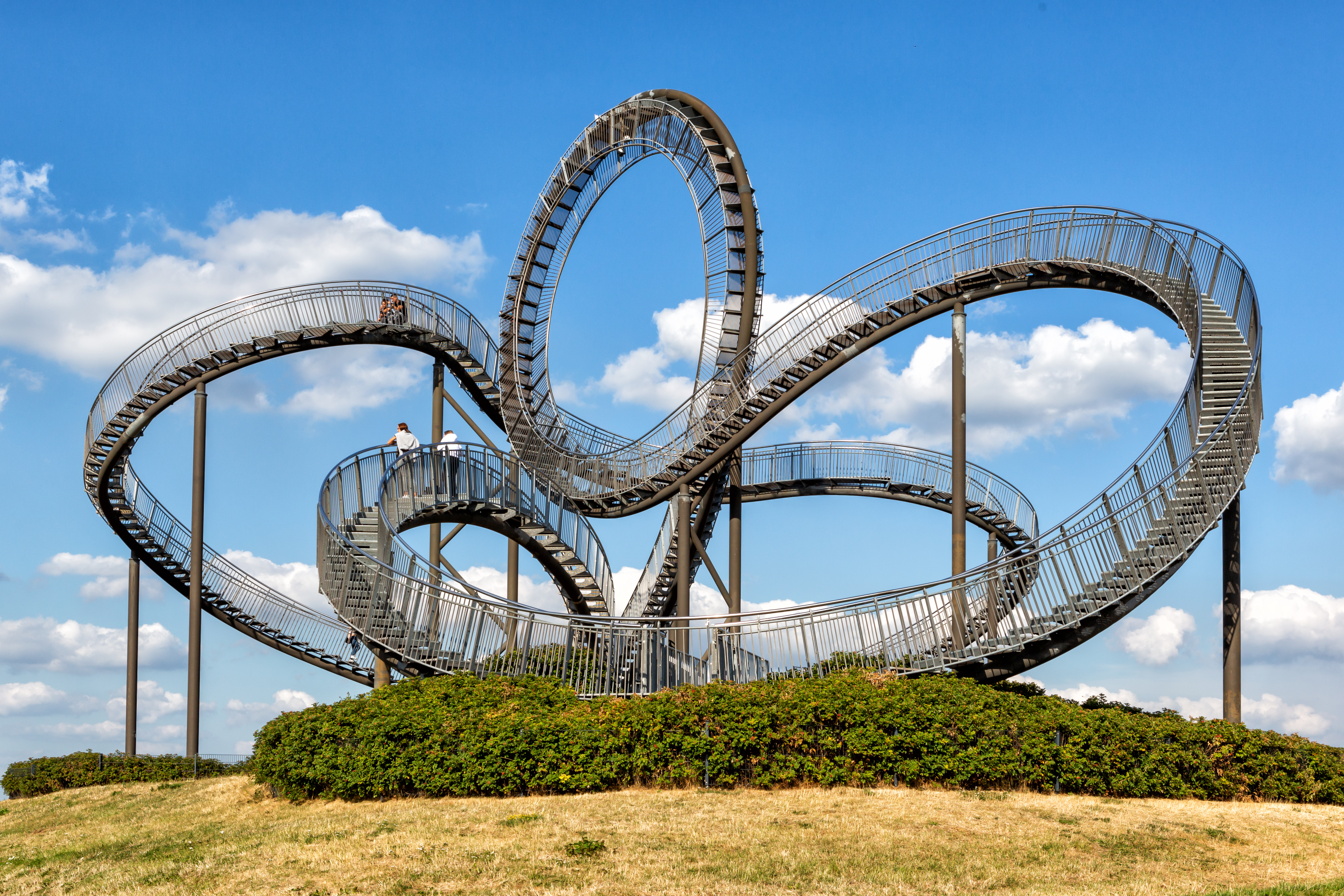
View of the sculpture

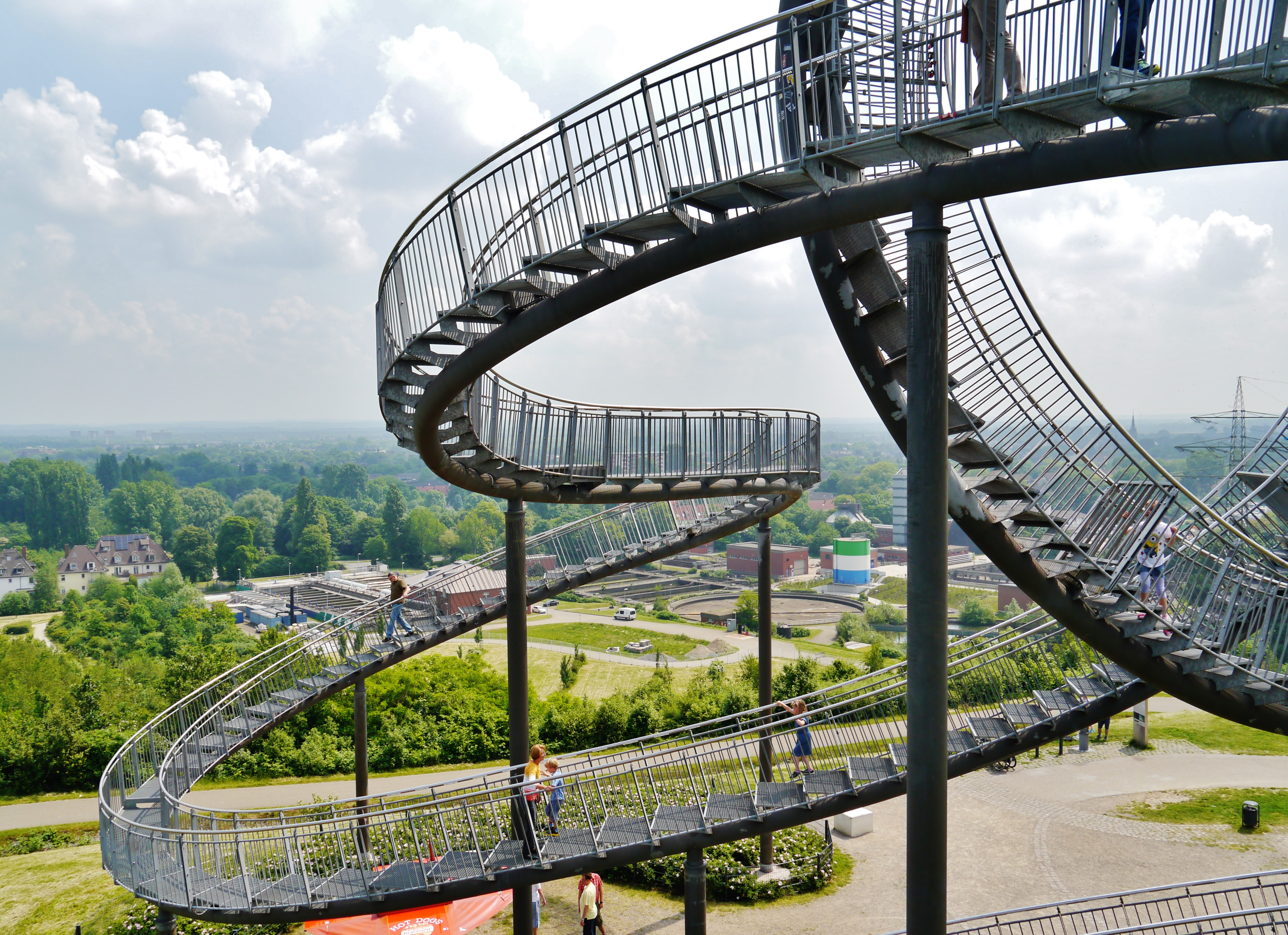
View from the sculpture

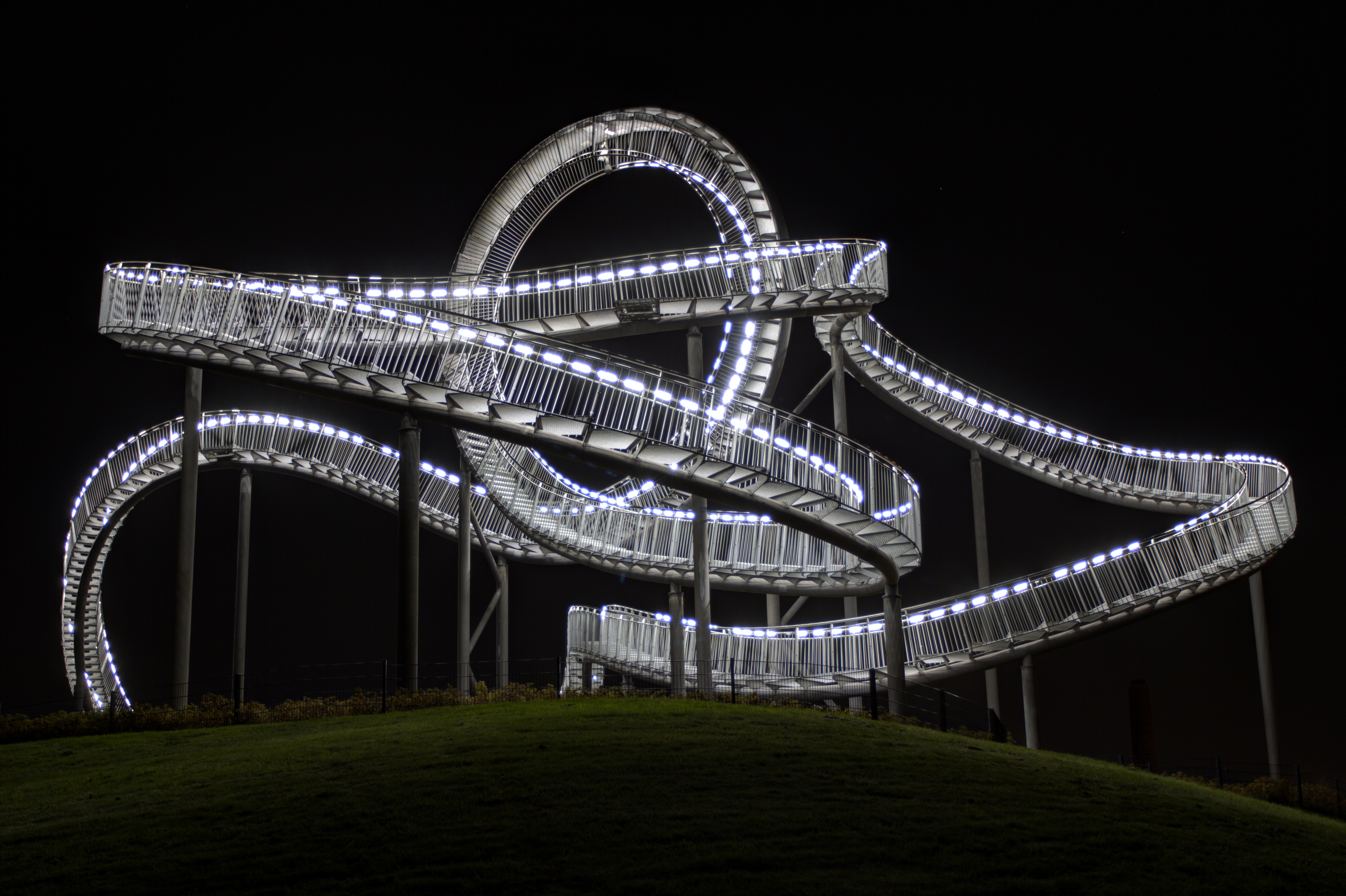
At night

== See also ==
- Pohang Space Walk, a similar sculpture in Pohang, South Korea
