= Spacewalk (disambiguation) =

Spacewalk, or Extravehicular activity, is going outside in space, beyond the spaceship or space station, in a spacesuit.

Spacewalk or space walk or variation, may also refer to:

- Spacewalk (film), a 2017 docudrama film about the 1965 Alexei Leonov first spacewalk for mankind
- Spacewalk (software), an open-source systems management software originating from Red Hat
- Space Walk, an album by Don Rendell
- Somerset Space Walk, a model solar system sculpture in Somerset, England, UK
- Pohang Space Walk, walkable sculpture in Pohang, South Korea
- US Space Walk of Fame, a plaza on the Indian River, in Titusville, Florida, USA
- "Space Walk", a song by Lemon Jelly from the album Lost Horizons
- Spacewalk, a freestyle skateboarding trick

== See also ==
- List of spacewalks
- Space (disambiguation)
- Walk (disambiguation)
