= Pohang =

City in North Gyeongsang, South Korea

Coordinates: 36°01′56″N 129°21′54″E

- Specific city
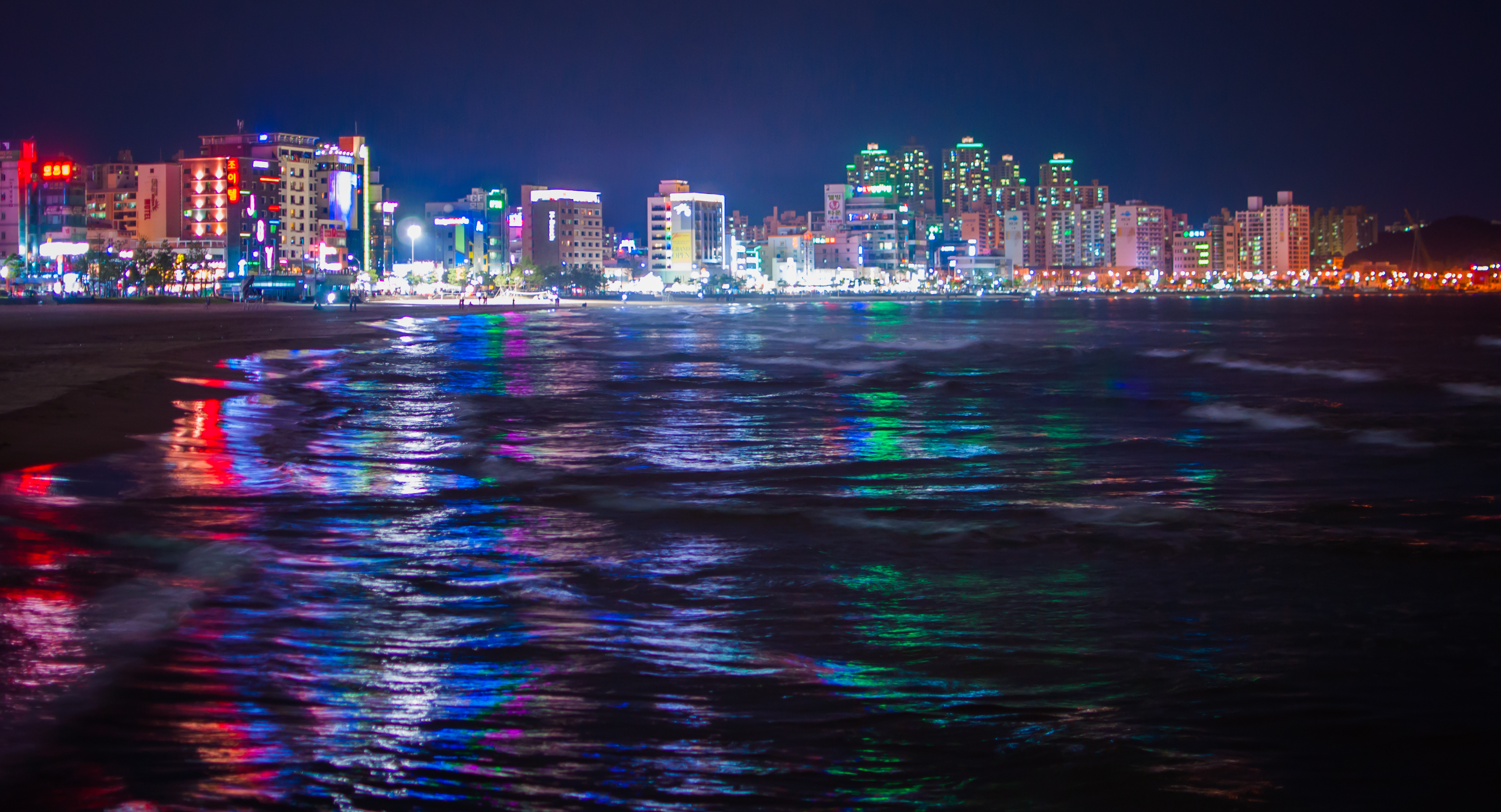
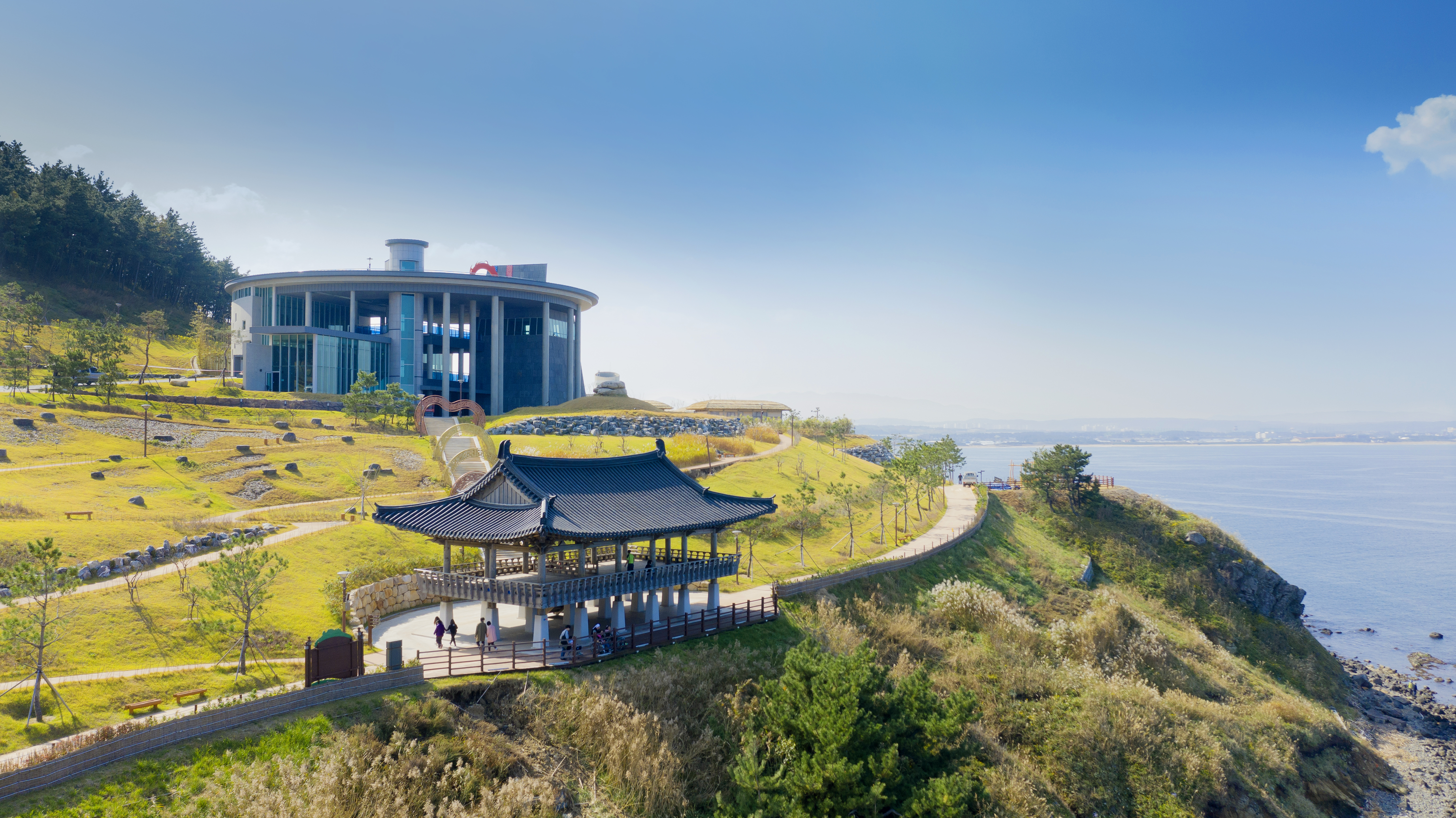
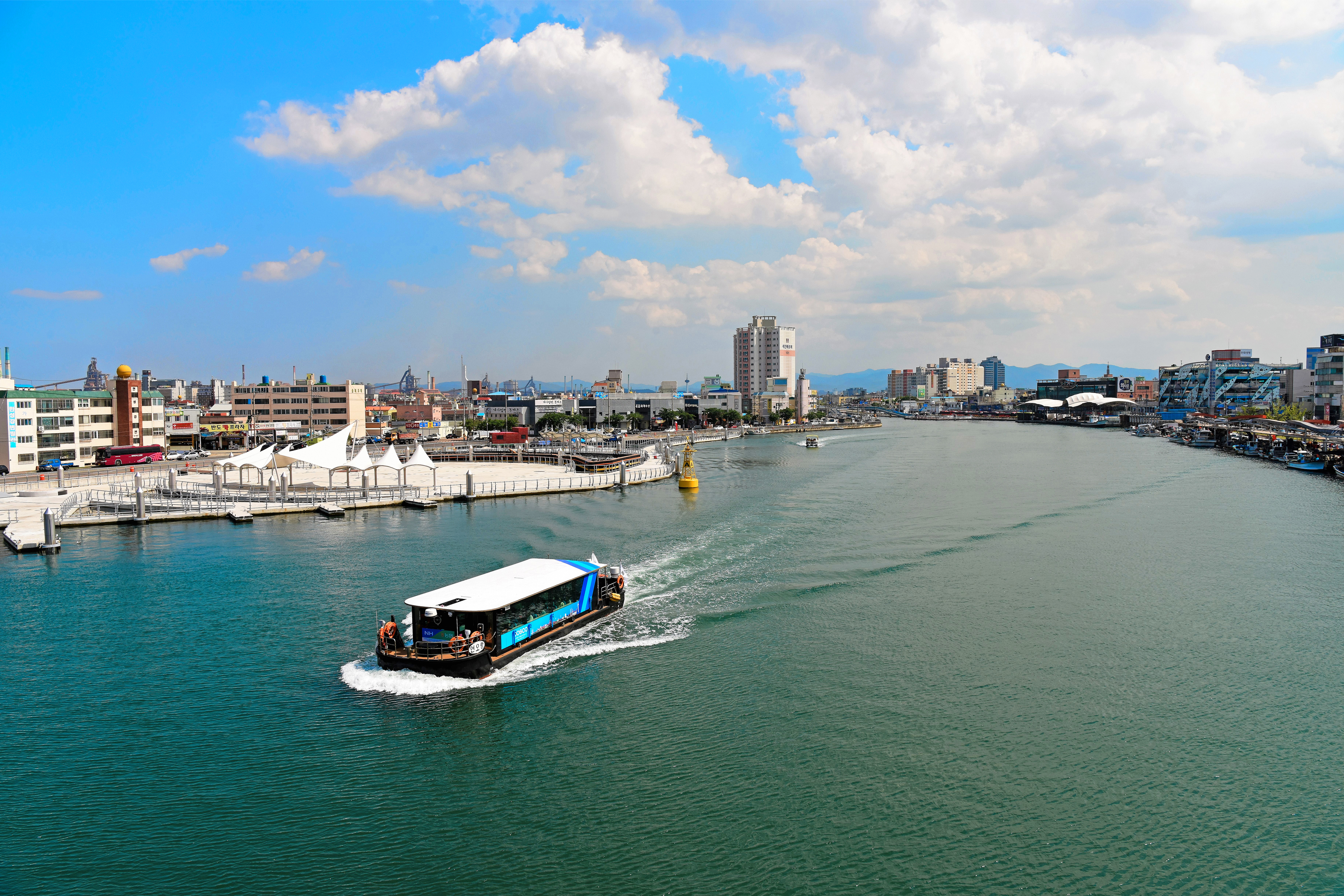
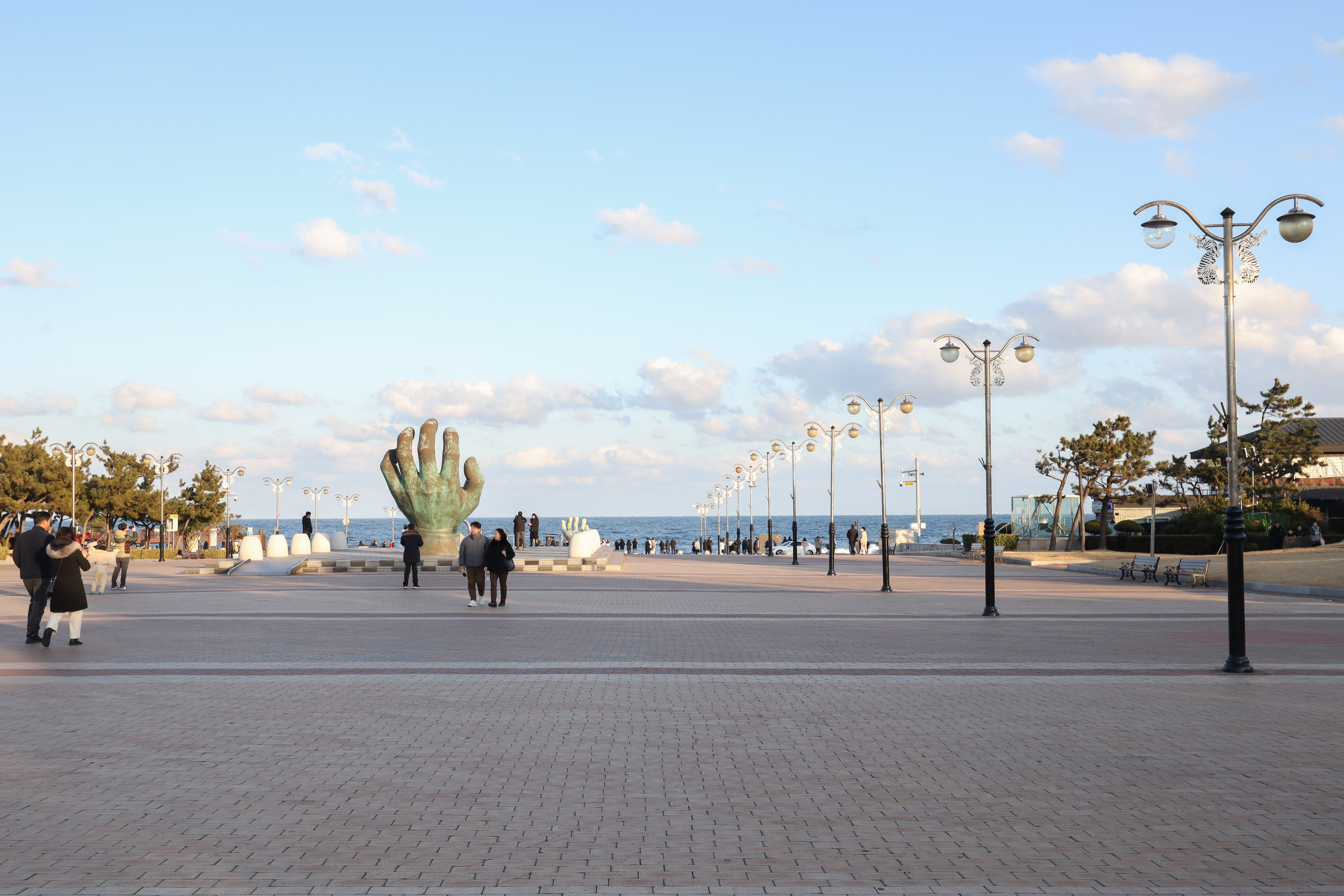
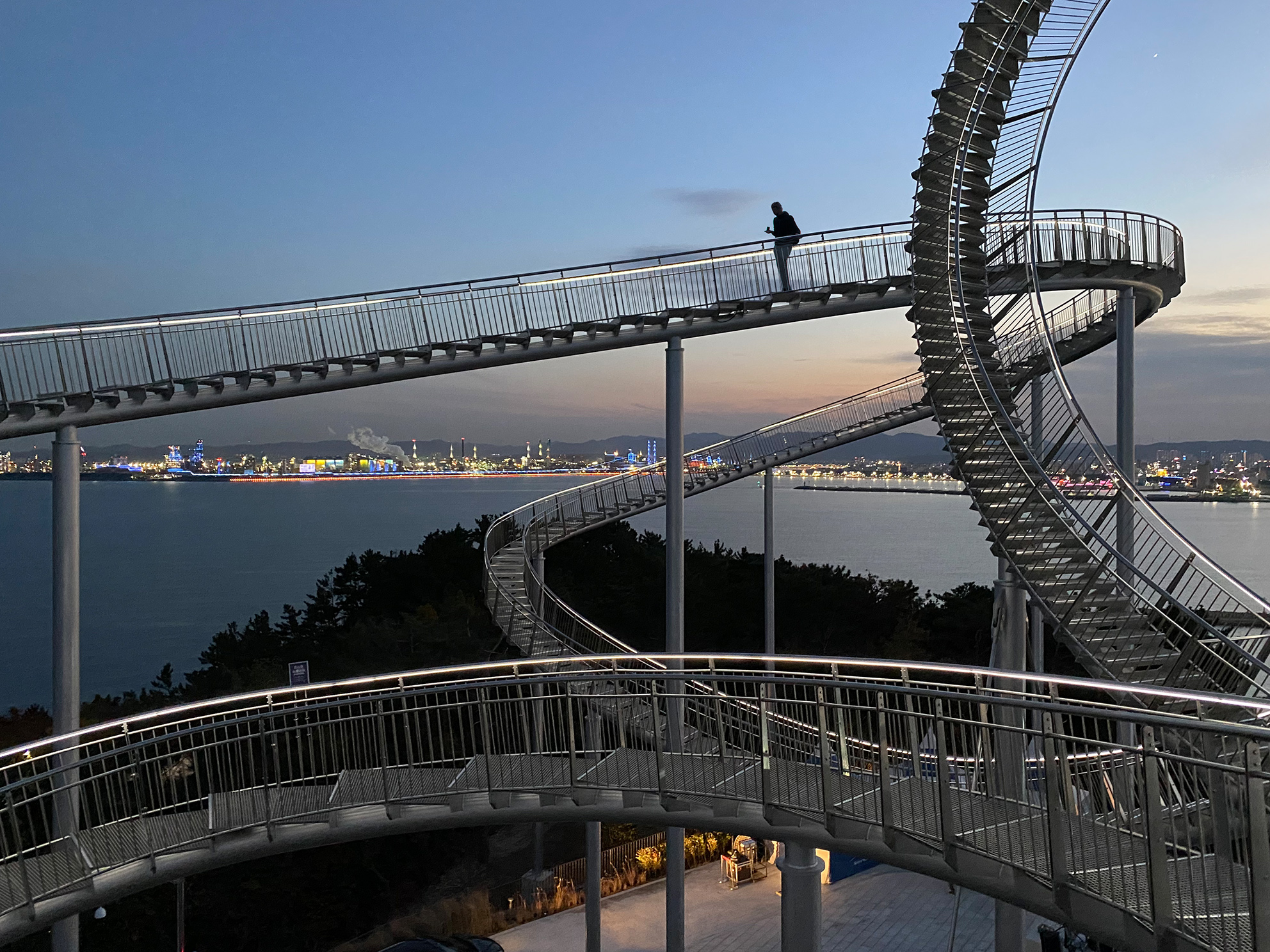
- Night view of Pohang Yeonorang and Seonyeo Theme Park Pohang Canal Homigot Pohang Space Walk

- Flag

- Location in South Korea
- Country: South Korea
- Region: Yeongnam
- Administrative divisions: 2 gu, 15 dong, 4 eup, 10 myeon

Government
  - Mayor: Park Yong-sun (People Power)

Area
  - Total: 1,128.76 km^{2} (435.82 sq mi)

Population (February 2026)
  - Total: 491,325
  - Density: 442.4/km^{2} (1,146/sq mi)
  - Dialect: Gyeongsang
- Demonym: Pohangite
- Time zone: UTC+9 (Korea Standard Time)
- Area code: +82-54-2xx

Korean name
- Hangul: 포항시
- Hanja: 浦項市
- RR: Pohang-si
- MR: P'ohang-si

Pohang (Korean: 포항; Korean pronunciation: [pʰo.ɦaŋ]) is the largest city in North Gyeongsang Province, South Korea, with a population of 499,363 as of 2022, bordering the East Sea to the east, Yeongcheon to the west, Gyeongju to the south, and Cheongsong and Yeongdeok County to the north.

The city has food, textile, and metal industries. Agricultural products such as grapes, persimmons and garlic chives are abundant, and the city's proximity to the East Sea has led to the development of a fishing industry. Gwamegi is a local specialty.

The South Korean Marine Corps 1st Division is stationed in Pohang, and their Education and Training Command is located there as well.

Tourist attractions include the Jukdo Fish Market, where fresh seafood is sold, as well as the Yeongildae Beach, Wolpo Beach, and Pohang Songdo Beach. Naejangsan Mountain divides Pohang and Yeongdeok and has twelve waterfalls.

== History ==
The earliest evidence of human occupation in the Pohang area is from the Mumun Pottery Period (1500–300 BC). Archaeologists have unearthed small villages and megalithic burials (dolmen) from this period. Still a small fishing village at the dawn of the 20th century, the earliest steps toward developing Pohang into a place of greater significance were taken in 1930 with the construction of a modern harbour. Pohang grew rapidly afterward, attaining the designation of town (eup) in 1931 and then earning the status of city (si) in 1949.

Pohang's road arteries and shipping port made it a place of strategic significance during the Korean War. An unopposed landing of UN forces at Pohang on July 18, 1950 was the first large-scale amphibious operation since World War II, and the region around Pohang saw fierce clashes between South Korea's 3rd Infantry Division and North Korea's 5th Infantry Division during August–September 1950.

By the 1960s, Pohang was a small coastal city with a population of 50,000. The next major development in Pohang's growth came in 1968 with the inauguration of the steel maker POSCO, and the local plant's commencement of production in 1972. The introduction of heavy industry to the city brought the local economy to a blend of iron, steel, shipbuilding and fisheries through the end of the 20th century.

Historical population
Year	Pop.	±%
1950	16,140	—
1960	35,473	+119.8%
1970	77,690	+119.0%
1980	201,174	+158.9%
1990	313,414	+55.8%
2000	515,714	+64.5%
2010	511,390	−0.8%
2020	501,109	−2.0%

The early 21st century and the age of globalization has brought new economic challenges to companies such as POSCO, giving rise to beliefs that Pohang would be wise to not be overly reliant on heavy industry to maintain its prosperity. In response, the Pohang of today presents itself as having an eye to the future, striving to become a diversified city of environmentalism and advanced learning, as well as a centre of arts and culture.

During the Silla Dynasty the area was made up of four hyeon, Toehwa-hyeon (퇴화현; 退火縣), Jidap-hyeon (지답현; 只沓縣), Geunoji-hyeon (근오지현; 斤烏支縣), Haea-hyeon (해아현; 海阿縣). Then during the Goryeo Dynasty these four were renamed to Heunghae-gun (흥해군/興海郡), Janggi-hyeon (장기현; 長鬐縣), Yeongil-hyeon (영일현; 迎日縣), Cheongha-hyeon (청하현; 淸河縣) respectively.

On 4 August 1896, the three remaining hyeon, which at that time were Janggi, Yeonil (연일; 延日; originally Yeongil) and Cheongha were reassigned as counties or gun as part of the change to the 13-province division of the Korean Empire.

On 1 March 1914, the four counties were unified as one Yeongil-gun (영일군; 迎日郡), which was subdivided into 18 myeons.

On 1 April 1931, Pohang-myeon (포항면; 浦項面) was designated as an eup, thus giving Yeongil-gun 1 eup and 17 myeon.

On 1 April 1934, Jukbuk-myeon (죽북면; 竹北面) and Juknam-myeon (죽남면; 竹南面) were united to make Jukjang-myeon (죽장면; 竹長面), while Janggi-myeon (장기면; 長鬐面) and Bongsan-myeon (봉산면; 峰山面) united to make Jihaeng-myeon (지행면; 只杏面), so that there were 1 eup and 15 myeon.

On 1 October 1938, Hyeongsan-myeon (형산면; 兄山面) was incorporated into Pohang-eup, leaving Yeongil-gun with 1 eup and 14 myeon.

On 1 October 1942 Changju-myeon (창주면; 滄洲面) was renamed and reclassified as Guryongpo-eup (구룡포읍/九龍浦邑), leaving 2 eup and 13 myeon.

On 15 August 1949, Pohang-eup was designated as Pohang-si (포항시; 浦項市), leaving Yeongil with 1 si, 1 eup, 13 myeon and 1 local office.

On 8 July 1956, Heunghae-myeon (흥해면; 興海面) and Gokgang-myeon (곡강면; 曲江面) are incorporated into Uichang-myeon (의창면; 義昌面) leaving 1 si, 1 eup and 12 myeon.

On 29 October 1957, Daljeon-myeon (달전면; 達田面) is abolished and incorporated into Heunghae-myeon and Yeonil-myeon (연일면; 延日面) leaving 1 si, 1 eup and 11 myeons.

On 1 March 1967, the Gibuk Local Office (기북출장소; 杞北出張所) of Gigye-myeon (기계면/杞溪面) is established.

On 1 July 1973, Uichang-myeon is designated as Uichang-eup (의창읍; 義昌邑) leaving 1 si, 2 eup, 10 myeon and 3 local offices.

On 1 December 1980, Yeonil-myeon and Ocheon-myeon (오천면; 烏川面) are both designated as eup leaving 1 si, 4 eup, 8 myeon and 3 local offices.

On 1 September 1982, Haedo-dong (해도동; 海島洞) and Sangdae-dong (상대동; 上大洞) are separated into Haedo 1 and 2-dong and Sangdae 1 and 2-dong respectively.

On 1 April 1986, Daebo Local Office (대보출장소; 大甫出張所) and Gibuk Local Office are designated as myeon leaving 1 si, 4 eup, 10 myeon and 1 local office.

On 1 January 1995, a united Pohang absorbs all of Yeongil-gun, composed of 1 si, 2 gu, 4 eup, 10 myeon, 25 dong and 1 local office.

On 1 September 1998, the unification of Small-dong left Pohang with 1 si, 2 gu, 4 eup, 10 myeon, 19 dong and 1 local office.

On 1 January 2009, the unification of Small-dong left Pohang with 1 si, 2 gu, 4 eup, 10 myeon, 15 dong and 1 local office.

== Geography and climate ==
Pohang is located along the coast of Yeongil Bay. The city is situated at the mouth of the Hyeongsan River, which flows into Yeongil Bay. Geologically, it is located within the Pohang Basin, an area composed of Neogene sedimentary rocks that are of significant interest in South Korean geology due to their diverse fossil records.

Under the Köppen climate classification, Pohang has a humid subtropical climate (Cfa). The mean temperature in the coldest month, January, is relatively mild at 2.2 °C. The warmest month is August, when the mean temperature is 26.0 °C. On average, Pohang receives 1,152 mm of precipitation per year. The driest month is December, when the city receives a scant 25.7 mm of precipitation on average. However, the mean amount of precipitation for the wettest month, August, is 227.4 mm.

Climate data for Pohang (1991–2020 normals, extremes 1943–present)
Month	Jan	Feb	Mar	Apr	May	Jun	Jul	Aug	Sep	Oct	Nov	Dec	Year
Record high °C (°F)	17.5 (63.5)	24.9 (76.8)	27.1 (80.8)	32.8 (91.0)	36.1 (97.0)	37.7 (99.9)	38.6 (101.5)	39.3 (102.7)	35.9 (96.6)	30.5 (86.9)	28.0 (82.4)	21.5 (70.7)	39.3 (102.7)
Mean daily maximum °C (°F)	6.7 (44.1)	9.0 (48.2)	13.3 (55.9)	19.1 (66.4)	23.5 (74.3)	25.8 (78.4)	29.0 (84.2)	29.5 (85.1)	25.5 (77.9)	21.4 (70.5)	15.4 (59.7)	8.9 (48.0)	18.9 (66.0)
Daily mean °C (°F)	2.2 (36.0)	4.3 (39.7)	8.6 (47.5)	14.1 (57.4)	18.6 (65.5)	21.8 (71.2)	25.4 (77.7)	26.0 (78.8)	21.9 (71.4)	16.9 (62.4)	10.6 (51.1)	4.3 (39.7)	14.6 (58.3)
Mean daily minimum °C (°F)	−1.5 (29.3)	0.2 (32.4)	4.2 (39.6)	9.6 (49.3)	14.4 (57.9)	18.6 (65.5)	22.5 (72.5)	23.3 (73.9)	18.9 (66.0)	13.1 (55.6)	6.6 (43.9)	0.5 (32.9)	10.9 (51.6)
Record low °C (°F)	−14.4 (6.1)	−13.4 (7.9)	−9.9 (14.2)	−2.3 (27.9)	3.7 (38.7)	8.2 (46.8)	10.8 (51.4)	14.0 (57.2)	8.9 (48.0)	0.6 (33.1)	−8.3 (17.1)	−13.1 (8.4)	−14.4 (6.1)
Average precipitation mm (inches)	39.8 (1.57)	36.5 (1.44)	60.5 (2.38)	81.2 (3.20)	84.6 (3.33)	126.8 (4.99)	200.6 (7.90)	230.2 (9.06)	189.3 (7.45)	76.7 (3.02)	40.1 (1.58)	26.1 (1.03)	1,192.4 (46.94)
Average precipitation days (≥ 0.1 mm)	5.7	5.9	8.5	8.2	8.5	9.7	13.7	13.5	11.3	6.4	6.2	4.7	102.3
Average snowy days	2.1	2.2	1.1	0.0	0.0	0.0	0.0	0.0	0.0	0.0	0.2	1.5	7.1
Average relative humidity (%)	48.8	50.8	55.4	57.1	64.1	73.9	78.3	78.6	75.3	65.1	57.4	49.9	62.9
Mean monthly sunshine hours	191.4	185.1	203.8	219.3	230.9	189.2	168.5	178.5	160.9	199.7	185.0	191.2	2,303.5
Percentage possible sunshine	60.8	57.5	51.2	54.4	51.3	42.0	36.2	40.7	41.5	55.4	59.3	63.0	50.1
Source: Korea Meteorological Administration (percent sunshine 1981–2010)

== Administrative Organization ==
- Head office: 1 head office, 4 office, 6 team, 25 department
- Executive office: 1 office 7 experts
- Direct organizations: three centers and six departments
- Business offices: 11 offices and 7 departments
- Nam-gu and Buk-gu office: 12 departments Eup, Myeon and Dong: 4 Eup, 10 Myeon and 15 Dong
- (The number of public officials: 1,960)
- Mayor
- Globalization strategy headquarter
- Self-governing Administration Bureau
- Economy & Industries Bureau
- Welfare environment office
- Construct and Urban Planning Bureau
- Nam-gu & Buk-gu Public Health Centers
- Agricultural Technology Center
- Construction Environment Office
- Water Supply Office
- Other centers
  - Culture & arts center
  - Municipal library
  - Municipal art gallery
  - Agricultural product wholesale market management office
  - Women's culture center
  - Park management office
  - Vehicle registration office

== Transportation ==
The city is served by several trains a day from Seoul and Daegu. Pohang is the terminus for a number of ferry routes serving the adjacent East Sea, including the main tourist route for Ulleung Island and Liancourt Rocks. Pohang is the home of POSCO (the Pohang Steel Company), one of the largest steel producers in the world, and a host of related industries. As a result, the port shipped a total of 54.8 million tons in 2006.

Several flights per day to Seoul Gimpo Airport and Jeju Airport are available at Pohang Gyeongju Airport.

Local transportation is served by only city buses. They run about 20 different ways of the city and some of them reach to the mountain folk. Also, the buses are classified into 2 kinds – one is Ilban-bus (normal bus) and the other is Jwaseok-bus (full of seats and a little more expensive than Ilban-bus). They run 15~25 minutes intervals along their own way. The bus routes are listed in both Korean and English but the Korean version is interactive, and thus more helpful.

There are two main bus terminals - Shiwae (시외) and Gosok (고속) which roughly translate into intercity/city and express. The Shiwae bus terminal (시외버스터미널) also acts as the cross-country bus terminal from which access to nearby metropolitan cities such as Daegu and Busan (~1.5 hrs each depending on traffic) is available. Their website is only in Korean and only accessible in Internet Explorer. The Gosok bus terminal (고속버스터미널) website is in both English and Korean. From Gosok bus terminal one can travel to Seoul and Gwangju.

Pohang is also serviced by two train stations - Pohang station (포항역) and Wolpo station (월포역). Times and destinations are available on the Korail website which is in English and Korean.

Passengers using the KTX had to go to Gyeongju station (경주역) until 2015. However, since 2015, the KTX travels directly to Pohang station (포항역).

== Education ==
=== Universities with graduate schools ===
- Pohang University of Science and Technology (POSTECH)
- Handong Global University

=== Other institutes of higher education ===
- Pohang College
- Sunlin College

== Health ==
There are some hospitals to treat people; two types of hospitals exist: public, and private. Public hospitals are run by the government, and supported by the government. Conversely, private hospitals are managed by the individuals. For example, S Pohang hospital is sponsored by the Ministry of Public Administration and Security which means it is supported by the government ("Introduction of the hospital" 1). They provide the treatments of brain disease, and spine disease. For private hospital, Pohang Sunlin Hospital is run by Hyunsu Shin ("Introduction of the head of the hospital" 1).

== Culture ==
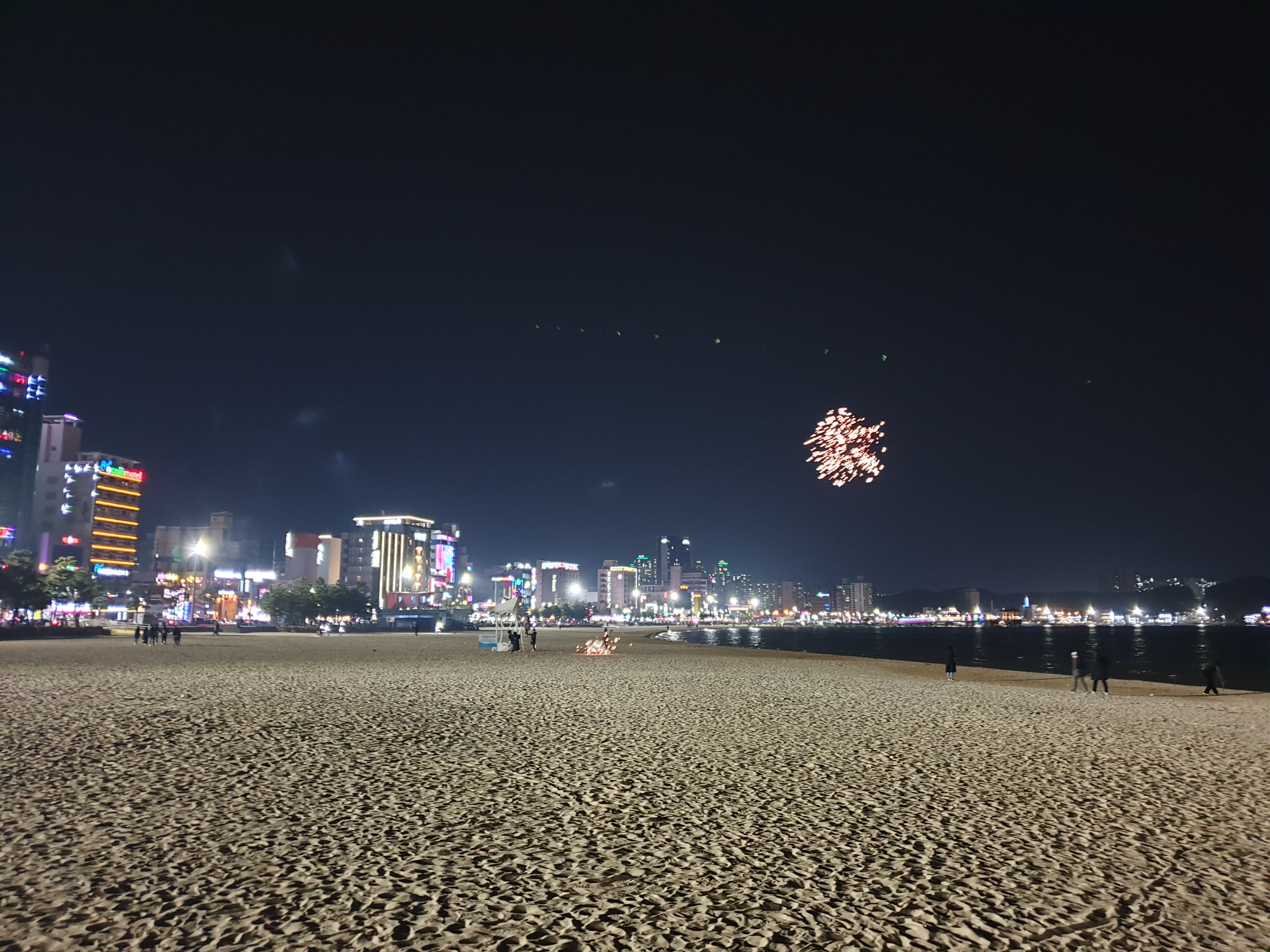
Yeongildae Beach

Thousands flock to see the fireworks festival at Yeongildae Beach each summer. People travel from all over the country to watch the show. The Culture & Arts Center, opened in 1995, holds performances and exhibitions in its various galleries and theaters. Pohang is known for gwamegi and holds an annual Gwamegi Festival. Gwamegi Festival is available on November annually. In 2015, the festival invited individuals from different ages. Numerous people can enjoy the festival, and the festival is sponsored by banks such as Suhyeop, Nonghyeop, Shinhan, and POSCO. During the festival, it is available to experience the old traditional Korean culture such as competing with person who sell Yeot. Furthermore, many singers from various places including Philippines are invited to demonstrate their talent to people ("Schedule" 1). In this place, Guryongpo, it is possible to try Gwamegi, Pidegi which is dried squid, and big crabs ("Information about the products in Guryongpo" 1).

=== Museums ===
- Guryongpo Gwamegi Culture Museum
- Guryongpo Modern History Museum
- The National Lighthouse Museum
- Yeongil Folk History Museum
- The Posco Museum
- Pohang Museum Of Steel Art
- Pohang Canal PR Hall
- Robo Life Museum

=== Monuments ===
- Sabang Memorial Park
- Saemaul Memorial Hall
- New Millennium Memorial Hall

=== Villages ===
- Deokdong Culture Village
- Duksil Village
- Sangok-ri

=== Experiences ===
- Botanical Garden of Gyeongsangbukdo
- Yeonorang Seonyeo Theme Park
- Key-Chungsan Botanical Garden
- Yeongilman Cruise
- Pohang Ship Experience

=== Other important spots ===
- Posco
- Pohang Accelerator Laboratory
- Korea Institute of Robotics & Technology Convergence

== Industry ==
=== Steel and Metal Industry ===
The city is home to the headquarters and large production facilities of POSCO, one of the world's largest steelmakers. Besides steel, the city has a burgeoning industry in electric vehicle battery materials through POSCO's subsidiary POSCO Future M. The city expects 70 trillion won in annual revenue from cathode materials alone produced in the city by companies such as POSCO and EcoPro BM.

== Sports ==
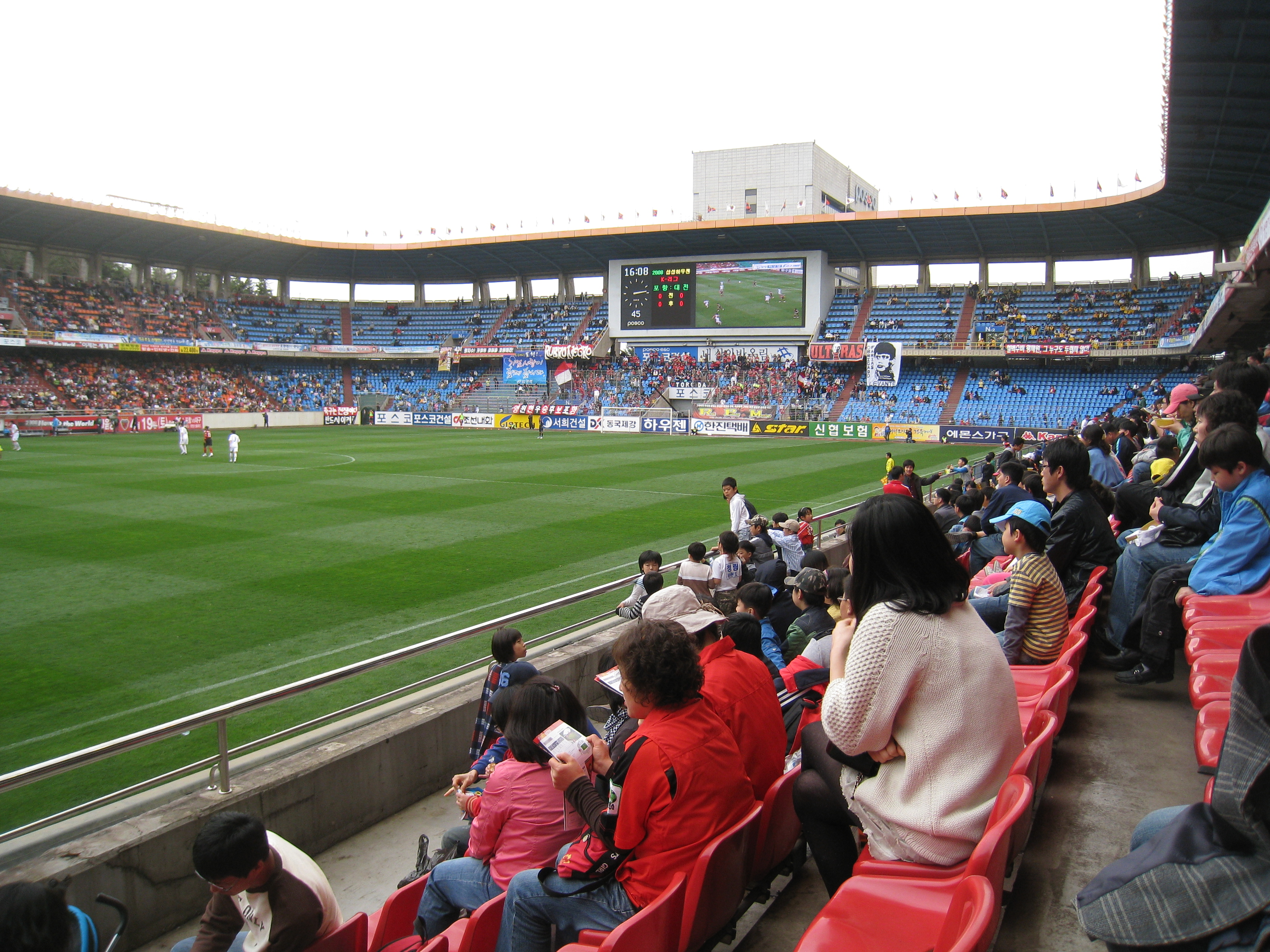
Pohang Steel Yard Football Stadium

The city is home to the Pohang Steelers of K League 1. Also, there is the Pohang Baseball Stadium, which Samsung Lions belonging to KBO League is using as the second stadium.

== Points of interest ==
The Jukdo Market is a large, bustling traditional market near the centre of the city, close to the port. It is well known throughout Korea as an important seafood market. There are many raw-fish restaurants in the market. The fish is cheaper here than in Seoul or Daegu.

Bukbu Beach is located in Duho-dong in the northern part of the city's built-up area. The beach front has been the focus of commercial developments such as bars, restaurants, and budget accommodations called Yeogwan. A number of beaches on the East Sea can be found just north of the built-up area, including Chilpo and Wolpo.

Homigot, a point of land jutting out into the East Sea, is located to the east of urban Pohang in Daebo-myeon. Homigot is one of the easternmost points on the Korean peninsula and as such serves every year as a gathering place for thousands to greet Korea's first sunrise of the New Year. The beach is also home to the 'Hands of Harmony' sculpture.

Bogyeongsa is a major Buddhist temple nestled in a steep green valley at the foot of Mount Naeyeon (710m) in Songna-myeon, an area in the extreme northern part of Pohang. Yeonsan Waterfall is located nearby in the same mountain valley. There are hiking trails leading from the temple up into the mountains. Bogyeongsa also has a number of mountain hermitages in the vicinity.

Oeosa is a temple located in the extreme southern part of Pohang, just inside the mountains south of the coastal plain formed by the Naengcheon River. It is located at the foot of Mt. Unjae (481m) in a steep valley in Daesong-myeon. Signs placed in and around Oeosa claim that the temple was founded by Wonhyo, the well-travelled Silla monk.

Space Walk is a roller-coaster like walkable art installation design by German artists Heike Mutter and Ulrich Genth and located in Hwanho Park. Constructed over a two-and-a-half-year period by POSCO from 317 tons of steel, the park open November 19, 2021.

== Notable people ==
- Lee Myung-bak, former South Korean President
- Lee Ho-yang (known in the West as Shinsadong Tiger), composer and record producer
- Chan Sung Jung, mixed martial artist, UFC fighter.
- Song Ji-hyo, actress and variety star
- Ray, member of South Korean boy band C-Clown
- Lee Dong-gook, soccer player with Jeonbuk Hyundai Motors
- JinE (Real Name: Shin Hye-jin, 신혜진), former member of South Korean girl band Oh My Girl
- Lee Chaeyoung, member of South Korean girl band Fromis 9
- Kang Yeosang (known as Yeosang), member of South Korean boy band ATEEZ
- Yoo Seung-ho, actor in films including The Way Home
- Lee Jaehyeong (known as Jaehyeong), member of South Korean rock band The Rose
- Kim Yong-seung (known as Yongseung), member of South Korean boy band VERIVERY
- Bae Sumin (known as Sumin), leader of South Korean girl band STAYC
- Ah-hee Lee (known as Magenta), member of South Korean rock band QWER and YouTuber
- Kim Jiwoong (known as Jiwoong, Jinam), actor and member of South Korean boy group Zerobaseone

== Shopping ==
The main downtown shopping area is between Yukgeori (육거리) and Ogeori (오거리) which translate to 6-way intersection and 5-way intersection. The streamlet boardwalk shopping area opens and ends with Pohang Station and Yukgeori, respectively. This shopping area has several stores, restaurants, and a few bars.

== Administrative divisions ==
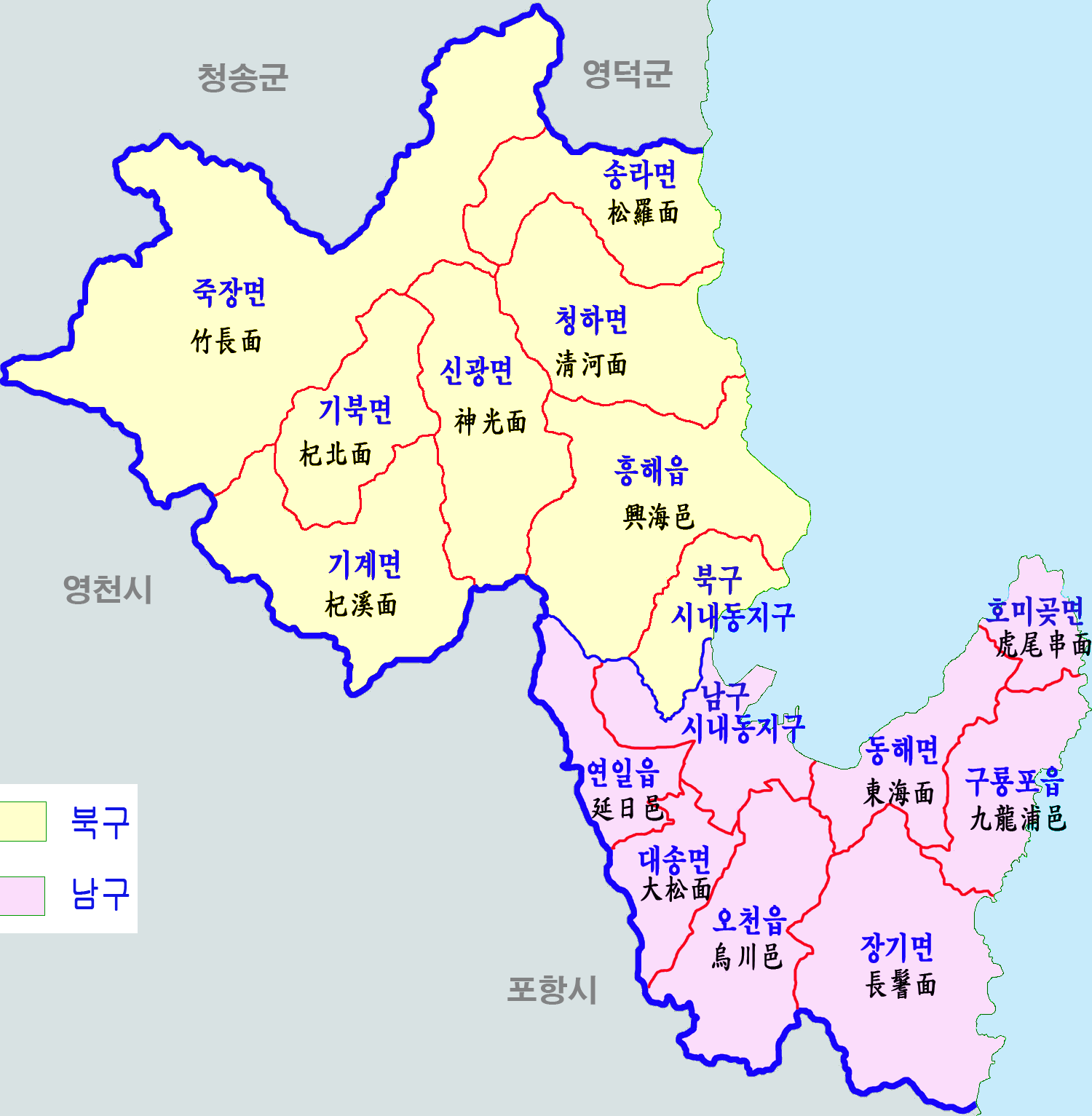
Pohang eup/myeon/dong map in Korean. Yellow is Buk-gu and Purple is Nam-gu.

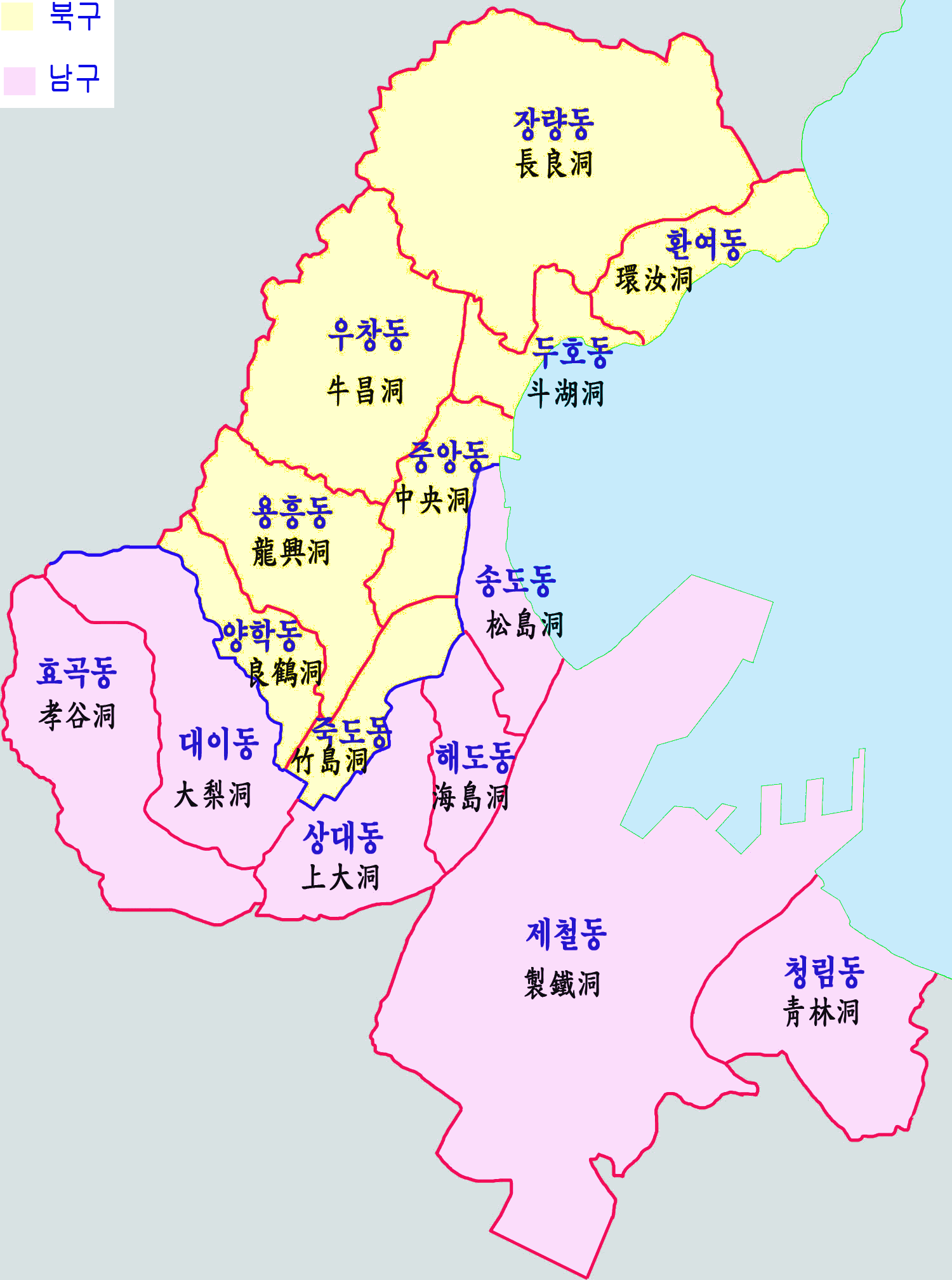
Inset map. Yellow is Buk-gu and Purple is Nam-gu.

Pohang is divided into 2 non-autonomous districts, which in turn is divided into 4 eup, 10 myeon and 15 dong.

District	Hangeul	Hanja	eup/myeon/dong	Hangeul	Hanja
Buk District	북구	北區	Heunghae-eup	흥해읍	興海邑
Buk District	북구	北區	Singwang-myeon	신광면	神光面
Buk District	북구	北區	Cheongha-myeon	청하면	淸河面
Buk District	북구	北區	Songra-myeon	송라면	松羅面
Buk District	북구	北區	Gigye-myeon	기계면	杞溪面
Buk District	북구	北區	Jukjang-myeon	죽장면	竹長面
Buk District	북구	北區	Gibuk-myeon	기북면	杞北面
Buk District	북구	北區	Jungang-dong	중앙동	中央洞
Buk District	북구	北區	Yanghak-dong	양학동	良鶴洞
Buk District	북구	北區	Jukdo-dong	죽도동	島洞
Buk District	북구	北區	Yongheung-dong	용흥동	龍興洞
Buk District	북구	北區	Uchang-dong	우창동	牛昌洞
Buk District	북구	北區	Duho-dong	두호동	斗湖洞
Buk District	북구	北區	Jangryang-dong	장량동	長良洞
Buk District	북구	北區	Hwanyeo-dong	환여동	環汝洞
Nam District	남구	南區	Guryongpo-eup	구룡포읍	九龍浦邑
Nam District	남구	南區	Yeonil-eup	연일읍	延日邑
Nam District	남구	南區	Ocheon-eup	오천읍	烏川邑
Nam District	남구	南區	Daesong-myeon	대송면	大松面
Nam District	남구	南區	Donghae-myeon	동해면	東海面
Nam District	남구	南區	Janggi-myeon	장기면	長鬐面
Nam District	남구	南區	Homigot-myeon	호미곶면	虎尾串面
Nam District	남구	南區	Sangdae-dong	상대동	上大洞
Nam District	남구	南區	Haedo-dong	해도동	海島洞
Nam District	남구	南區	Songdo-dong	송도동	松島洞
Nam District	남구	南區	Cheongnim-dong	청림동	靑林洞
Nam District	남구	南區	Jecheol-dong	제철동	製鐵洞
Nam District	남구	南區	Hyogok-dong	효곡동	孝谷洞
Nam District	남구	南區	Daei-dong	대이동	大梨洞

== Twin towns – sister cities ==
Pohang is twinned with:

- Fukuyama, Japan
- Hunchun, China
- İzmit, Turkey
- Jōetsu, Japan
- Pittsburg, United States
- Vladivostok, Russia

=== Friendly cities ===
Pohang is cooperating with:

- North Shore City, New Zealand (August 2008)
- Zhangjiagang, China

== See also ==
- 2017 Pohang earthquake
- Beopgwangsa
- List of cities in South Korea
- Wongaksa (Gigye, Pohang)

== Citation ==
"Announcement about the Pause of Pohang Airport." Pohang Airport. Governor of Pohang, 17 Feb. 2016. Web.

"포항공항(Pohang Airport)." 실시간 운항정보(Flights in Real Time). N.p., n.d. Web. 18 Mar. 2016.

"포항야구장(Pohang Baseball Stadium)." 시설소개. 시설관리공단(Organization That Manages Facility), n.d. Web. 18 Mar. 2016.

Kim, Minje. "전체기사(Whole Articles)." 전체기사(Whole Articles). Jakeun News, 16 Dec. 2015. Web. 18 Mar. 2016.

Kim, Jumdol. "구룡포 과메기 축제(Guryongpo Gwamegi Festival)." 구룡포 과메기 축제(Guryongpo Gwamegi Festival). Jumdol Kim, n.d. Web. 18 Mar. 2016.

"보건복지부 인증 전문병원-에스포항병원(뇌센터, 척추센터)!! :: 병원소개(S Pohang Hospital Introduction of the Hospital)." 보건복지부 인증 전문병원-에스포항병원(뇌센터, 척추센터)!! :: 병원소개(S Pohang Hospital Introduction of the Hospital). Executives and Staff Members, Dec. 2008. Web. 18 Mar. 2016.

Shin, Hyunsu. "병원장 인사말(Introduction by the Head of the Hospital)." Sunlin Hospital. Hyunsu Shin, n.d. Web. 18 Mar. 2016.

"지역별 문의처(Inquiry for Locals)." Marine in South Korea. N.p., n.d. Web. 18 Mar. 2016.

"지원 FAQ(enrolling FAQ)." Marine in South Korea. N.p., n.d. Web. 18 Mar. 2016.
