= Sangok-ri =

Village in Pohang, South Korea

Sangok-ri viewed from the south

Sangok-ri (상옥리) is a small village (ri) in Pohang City District, Gyeongsangbuk-do Province, South Korea. Sangok-ri is located deep in the mountains north of Pohang near Neyeon Mountain. The village is divided into two wards, Sangok and Haok. Sangok-ri's population is 553. Sangok-ri has many trees and mountain streams. Sangok-ri has Gyeongsangbuk-do Arboretum. Gyeongsangbuk-do Arboretum is the largest botanical garden in Asia, some 3,222ha, containing 179,226 plants from 1,510 different species. The Arboretum shows many beautiful trees, flowers and has clean air.

== Culture ==
Sangok-ri has very beautiful countryside. Sangok-ri has two festivals each year. There is Sangok's Tomato Festival and the Ice Sled Festival. Around 20,000 people came to the Ice Sled Festival in February 2012.

== Education ==
Sangok-ri has two schools, Sangok Middle School and Sangok Elementary School.

Sangok Elementary School There are 12 students in the school and 3 children in the kindergarten. They have a special class for Taekkyeon, a traditional Korean martial arts. Sangok Elementary School has many awards for Taekkyoun. Sangok Elementary School is a branch school of Jukjang Elementary School.

Sangok Middle school There are 12 students and 9 teachers. The school is very small. Students and teachers are very close. Taekkyoun is also taught at Sangok Middke School. There is a music room, science room, computer room, gym and tennis court. This school is a branch of Gigye Middle School.

== Transportation ==
Sangok-ri is served by three buses a day running from Chungha-myun Transfer Station to Haok-ri. Sangok-ri is also served by a bus from Daegu once a day.
