= Beopgwangsa =

Buddhist temple in Pohang, South Korea

Beopgwang Temple
- Location within South Korea

Religion
- Affiliation: Buddhism

Location
- Location: Sangeup-ri, Singwang-myeon, Buk-gu, Pohang, Gyeongsangbuk-do
- Country: South Korea
- Coordinates: 36.14634°N 129.2426°E

Architecture
- Elevation: 181 m (594 ft)

Korean name
- Hangul: 법광사
- Hanja: 法廣寺
- RR: Beopgwangsa
- MR: Pŏpkwangsa

Beopgwangsa is a temple located in Pohang, Gyeongsangbuk-do, South Korea.
