= Gubongsan (North Jeolla) =

Mountain in South Korea

Coordinates: 35.9232°N 127.4165°E

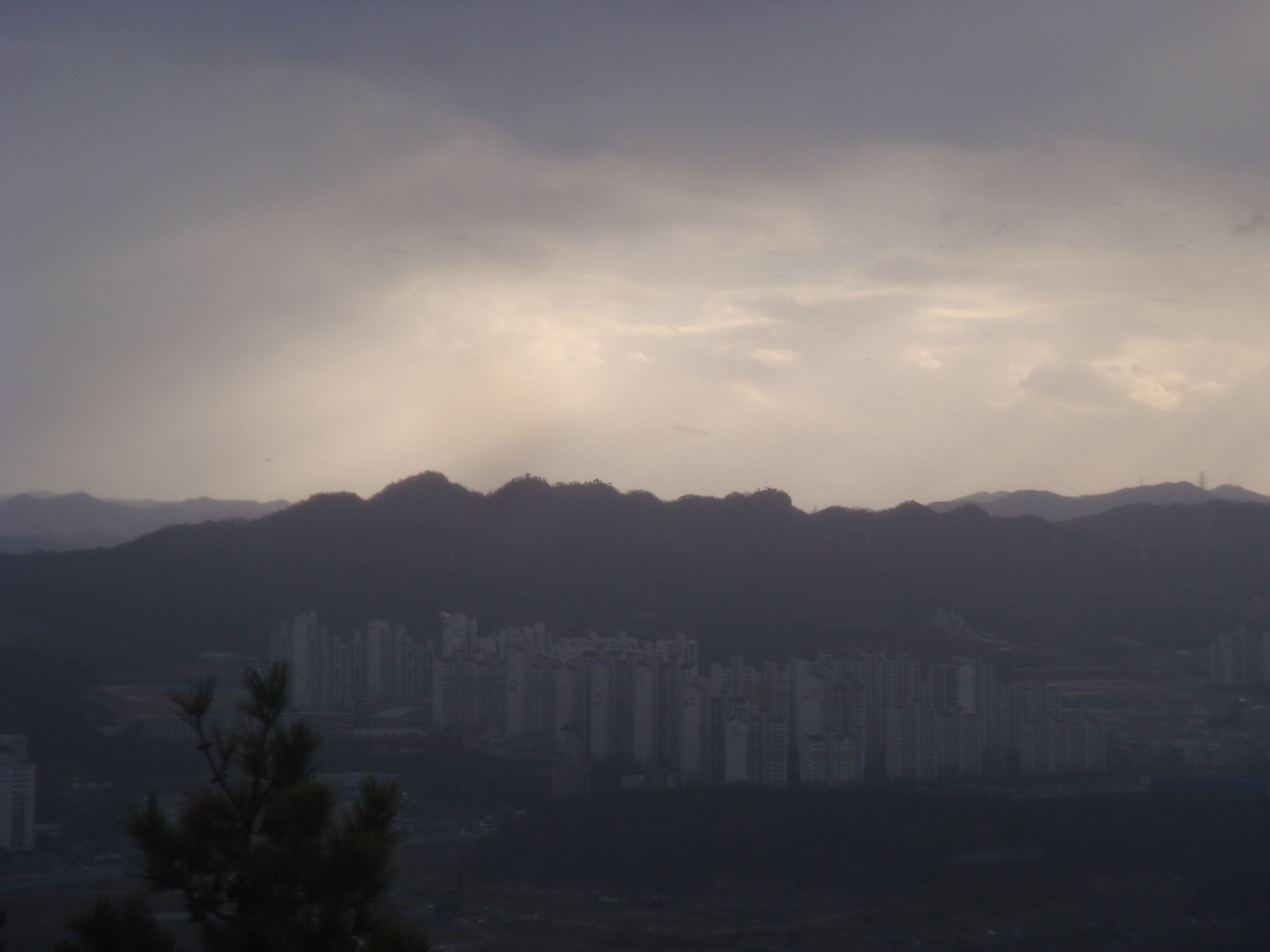

Highest point
- Elevation: 1,002 m (3,287 ft)

Geography
- Location: North Jeolla Province, South Korea

Korean name
- Hangul: 구봉산
- Hanja: 九峰山
- RR: Gubongsan
- MR: Kubongsan

Gubongsan (Korean: 구봉산) is a mountain of North Jeolla Province, western South Korea. It has an elevation of 1,002 metres (3,287 ft).

== See also ==
- List of mountains of Korea
