= Wongaksa (Gwangju) =

Buddhist temple in Gwangju, South Korea

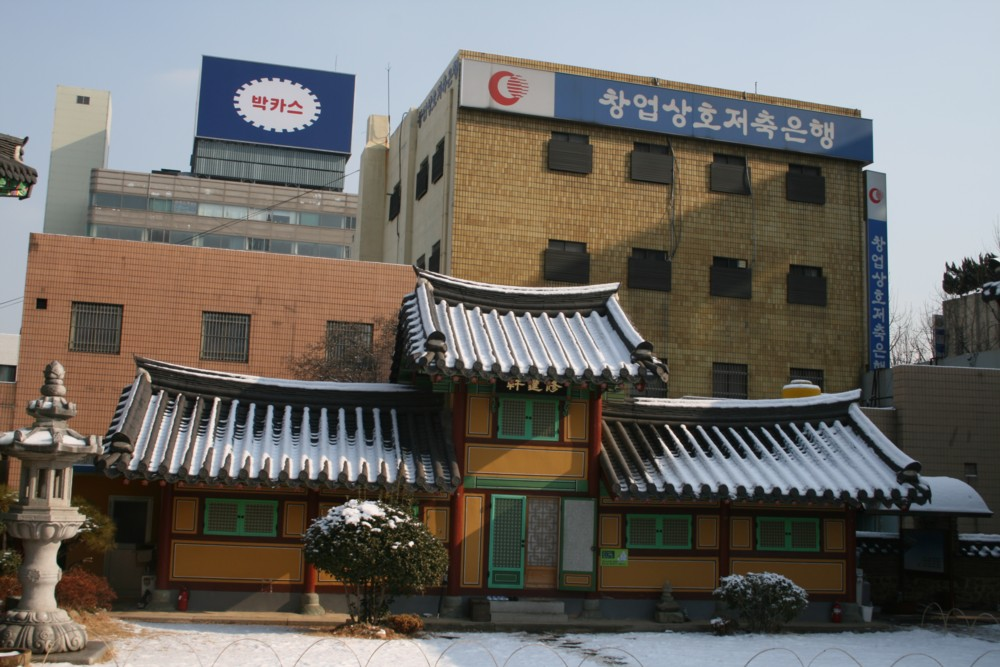
- Wongak Temple

- Location within South Korea

Religion
- Affiliation: Buddhism
- Sect: Jogye Order

Location
- Location: Gwangju
- Country: South Korea
- Coordinates: 35°09′03″N 126°54′57″E

Architecture
- Completed: 1914

Korean name
- Hangul: 원각사
- RR: Wongaksa
- MR: Wŏn'gaksa

Wongak Temple or Wongaksa is a South Korean Buddhist temple on the Geumnam street in the Dong-gu district, Gwangju city. Situated in the downtown of the metropolitan city, this is a branch temple of the Songgwang temple in Suncheon and belongs to the Jogye Order of Korean Buddhism. It was founded in 1914 by Master Geumbong Girim (錦峯基林) of Seonam temple as its missionary center in Gwangju.

== See also ==
- Korean Buddhist temples
- Korean Buddhism
