= Wongaksa (Gigye, Pohang) =

South Korean Buddhist temple

Wongak Temple
- Location within South Korea

Religion
- Affiliation: Buddhism

Location
- Location: Seonggye-ri, Gigye-myeon, Buk-gu, Pohang, Pohang, Gyeongsangbuk-do
- Country: South Korea
- Coordinates: 36.04818°N 129.22057°E

Architecture
- Elevation: 142 m (466 ft)

Korean name
- Hangul: 원각사
- RR: Wongaksa
- MR: Wŏn'gaksa

Wongaksa is a temple located in Gigye-myeon, Pohang, Gyeongsangbuk-do, South Korea.
