= Pohang Space Walk =

Walkable sculpture in South Korea

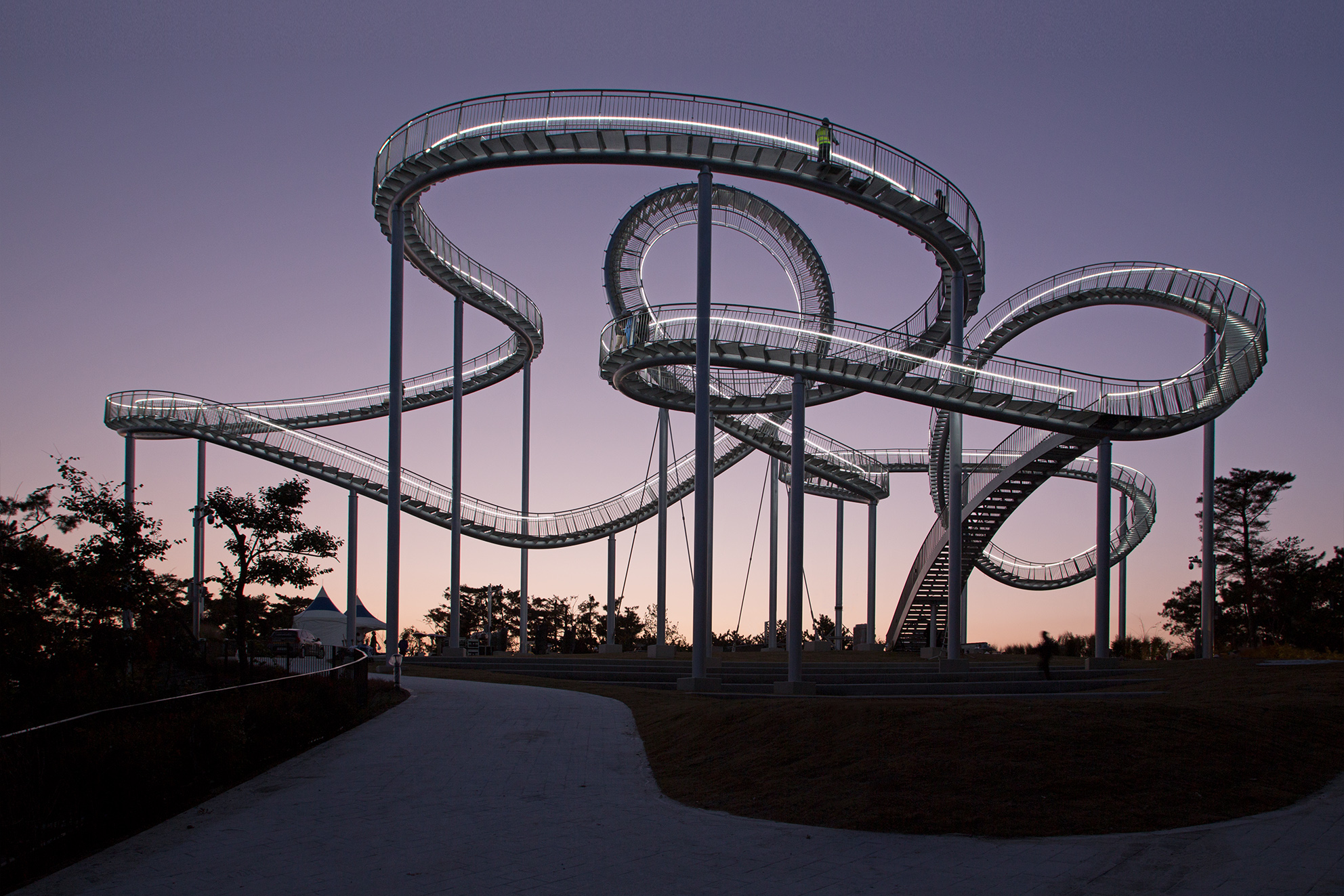
- Pohang Space Walk, 2021
- Artist: Heike Mutter and Ulrich Genth
- Completion date: November 18, 2021
- Medium: Stainless steel
- Dimensions: 25 m × 57 m × 60 m (82 ft × 187 ft × 200 ft)
- Weight: 317 metric tons
- Location: Pohang, South Korea; 36°03′54″N 129°23′26″E
- Owner: City of Pohang
- Website: www.spacewalk.or.kr/front/main/getEngMain.do (in English)

Pohang Space Walk (Korean: 포항 스페이스워크) is a walkable sculpture located in Hwanho Park, Buk-gu, Pohang, North Gyeongsang Province, South Korea. It was completed on November 18, 2021 and opened to the public the following day. The original name for the structure was Cloud, and it received its current name before its completion.

The sculpture was created as part of a joint effort by the city of Pohang and South Korean steel company POSCO, in order to increase local tourism. It is meant to evoke a feeling of reaching utopia and "swimming in space above the clouds", as well as to symbolize aspects of Pohang's prominent manufacturing and steel industries.

It is now a popular tourist attraction. By the end of 2023, it had a total of over two million visitors. It has also won a number of awards, including the 2022 Structure of the Year award from the Korean Steel Structure Society and South Korea's "2023 Star of Tourism".

== History ==
The city of Pohang and the company POSCO had previously collaborated on constructing Hwanho Park together in 2011. On April 1, 2019, a memorandum of understanding contract was signed between Pohang mayor Lee Kang-deok, president of POSCO Choi Jeong-woo, and the management of Hwanho Park. According to the contract, a steel sculpture was to be constructed in Hwanho Park in order to make the park a recognizable symbol of Pohang. Furthermore, POSCO was to construct the steel parts for the sculpture and donate them to Pohang.

Pohang Space Walk was designed by German designers Heike Mutter and Ulrich Genth, who are married. Genth had previously designed Tiger and Turtle – Magic Mountain, a similar interactive sculpture in Duisburg, Germany. The pair toured Pohang three times and used inspirations from various places they visited. They also consulted citizens and experts for ideas.

Plans for the structure began to be drafted in September 2019. On April 23, 2020, the final design for the structure was revealed. On January 19, POSCO officially received a permit to construct Pohang Space Walk, and had a projected completion date of August 2021. However, construction was temporarily halted on February 19 because something that was thought to be a fossil was found on the construction site. The sculpture's construction did not resume until May 2021, which caused its projected completion date to be pushed back.

On October 5, 2021, Lee and Genth conducted a preliminary inspection of the sculpture. By this point, the creation of the sculpture had cost a total of 11.7 billion South Korean won (around US$10,200,000). On November 18, 2021, construction on the sculpture officially completed, and it had a soft opening ceremony. Lee, Genth, Choi, and around 70 people were in attendance. An opening ceremony was held for the general public and POSCO employees on November 19, 2021. The opening ceremony featured a variety of amenities and activities, such as calligraphy, music, and photoshoots. On December 21, 2021, POSCO officially donated the sculpture to Pohang.

From November 20 to the end of the year, the structure was open to the public from 10 am to 4 pm on weekdays and 10 am to 5 pm on weekends and public holidays. Starting from March 2022, the sculpture changed its hours to operate at 10 am to 8 pm on weekdays and 10 am to 9 pm on weekends.

== Description ==
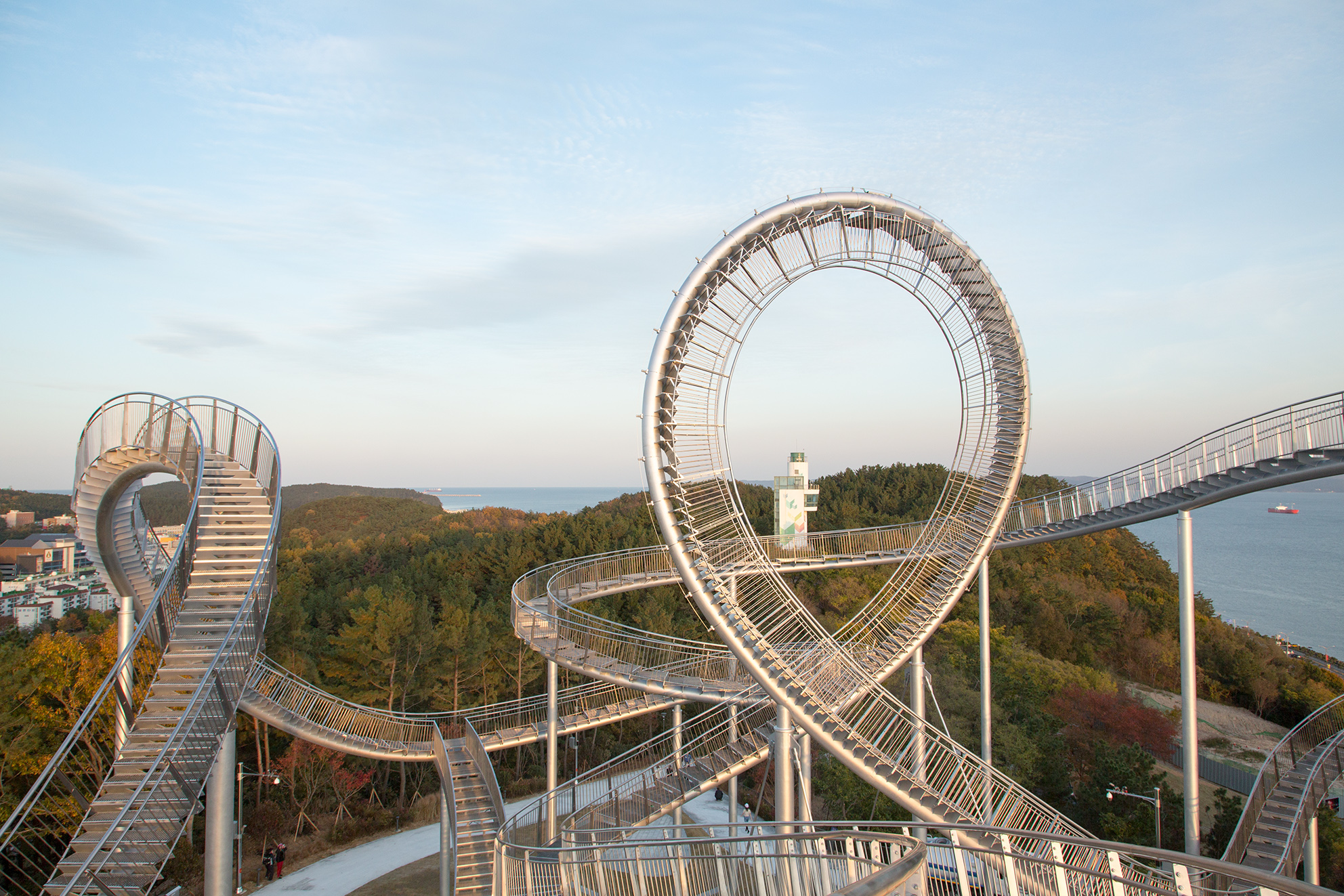
View of the sculpture, with inaccessible loop visible (2021)

The track of the structure was made using 317 tons of POSCO-produced stainless steel (stainless in order to resist corrosion, as it is in humid conditions near an ocean). It has 333 meters of track, which is supposed to represent "Steel", "Science" and "Sea"—the three "S"'s of Pohang. The structure is 60 meters wide, 57 meters long, and 25 meters high, and occupies 4,925 square meters of space. It has 717 steps in total.

In accordance with legal requirements, the structure is meant to be able to withstand earthquakes measuring up to 6.5 on the Richter scale. It can support up to 250 people at any given time. For safety reasons, if winds are faster than 8 meters per second (26 ft/s) or if there is severe rain, visitors cannot interact with the sculpture. At any time, visitors cannot walk through the looped part of the sculpture. It was reported in December 2021 that six guards protect the sculpture every day. From the highest point of the sculpture, visitors can see Yeongildae Beach and high rise apartments in the area.

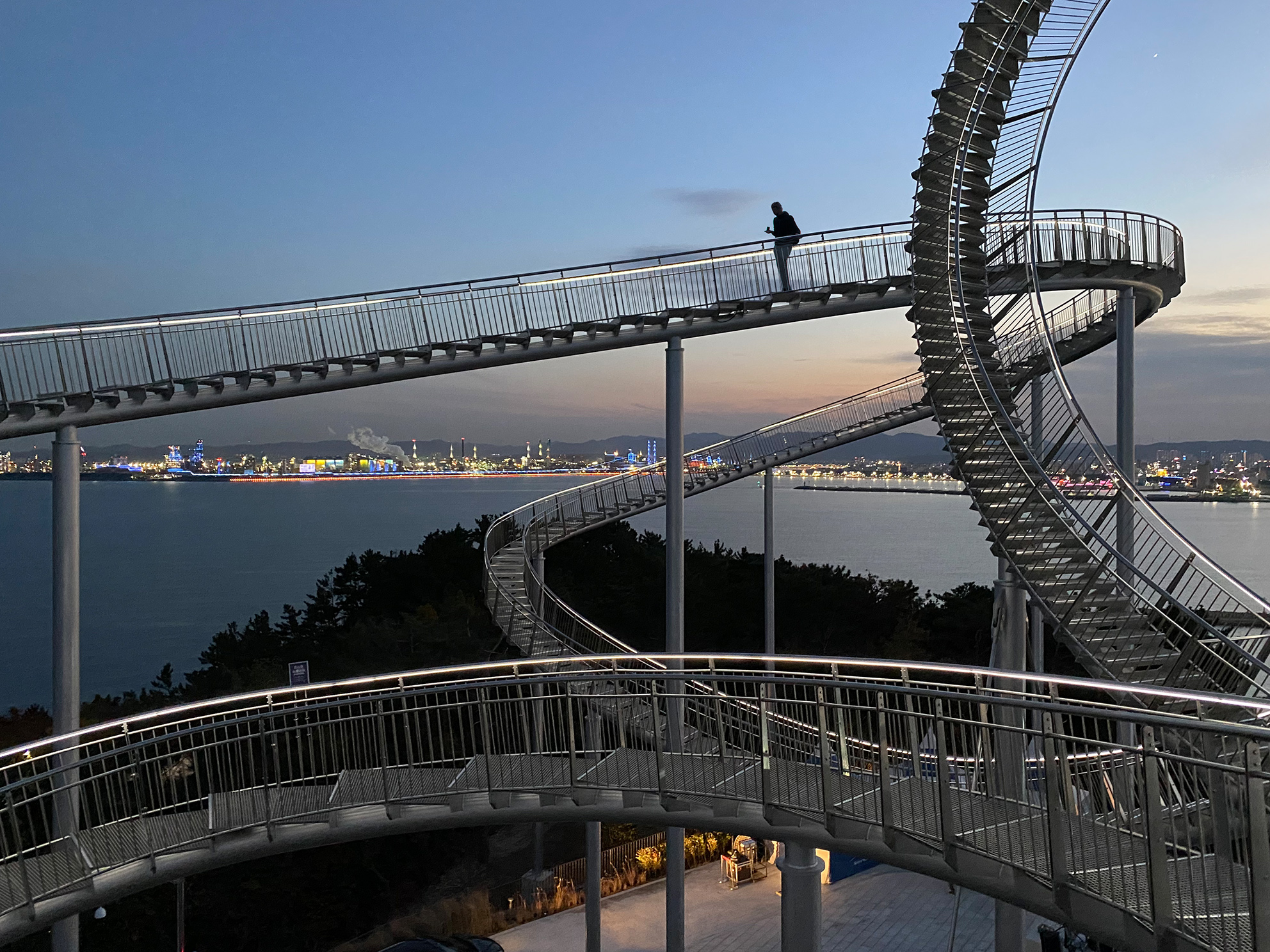
View from part of the sculpture (2021)

Genth has since stated that the structure's name was originally going to be Cloud; in December 2021 it was reported that this name was still used by some locals. The name Space Walk was eventually chosen because the structure is intended to evoke the feeling of "swimming in space above the clouds" for visitors. The structure is illuminated with lights, which Genth has stated is to mirror Pohang's status as a "city of light and steel". The sculpture is also supposed to represent challenging oneself to try to reach utopia one step at a time. The diverging tracks that reunite in the end represent the union of art and people, businesses and citizens, and POSCO and Pohang.

== Impact ==
Seventeen days after opening, Pohang Space Walk had seen a total of 41,723 visitors, with an average of around 2,450 visitors per day. By December 20, 2021, it had a total of 76,724 visitors, with an average of 2,000 visitors on weekdays and 5,000 on weekends. By February 17, 2022, it had 210,000 total visitors. By the end of 2023, it had over two million.

Pohang Space Walk was chosen as one of the Korean Steel Structure Society's Structures of the Year in 2022. In 2023, Pohang Space Walk was listed in a list of 100 places to be experienced at night in South Korea, and it received the "2023 Star of Tourism" in a survey conducted by the Korea Tourism Organization and the Korean Ministry of Recreation.

The football club Pohang Steelers received new uniforms in 2024 with designs inspired by that of Pohang Space Walk.

=== Gwangyang Space Walk ===
On May 9, 2022, Kim Jae-moo proposed building another similar Space Walk sculpture in the city of Gwangyang. Kim was then a Democratic Party of Korea politician running to be the mayor of Gwangyang, and thought that such a sculpture could boost tourism there. Like Pohang, Gwangyang has a prominent steel industry. On October 6, 2022, a contract was signed between POSCO and Gwangyang to create the structure at Gubongsan in Gwangyang, South Jeolla Province. From February 21 to 23, Gwangyang city officials visited Pohang Space Walk to learn about the structure and how it manages visitors. A contest was held to decide the structure's design, with five artists producing nine designs. Spanish designer Manuel Alvarez-Monteserin Lahoz's design was chosen. Monteserin visited Gwangyang on January 16, 2024, and toured the city. He also visited various steel manufacturers there and in Pohang. Gwangyang Space Walk was initially projected to be completed in 2025, but it would begin construction in February 26, 2025 at Gubongsan with the goal of finishing construction by March 2026.
